= Second Battle of Corinth order of battle: Union =

The following Union Army units and commanders fought in the Battle of Corinth of the American Civil War on October 3 and 4, 1862, in Corinth, Mississippi. Order of battle compiled from the army organization, return of casualties and reports. The Confederate order of battle is listed separately.

== Abbreviations used ==
=== Military rank ===
- MG = Major General
- BG = Brigadier General
- Col = Colonel
- Ltc = Lieutenant Colonel
- Maj = Major
- Cpt = Captain
- Lt = Lieutenant

=== Other ===
- w = wounded
- mw = mortally wounded
- k = killed
- c = captured

== Army of the Mississippi ==
MG William S. Rosecrans

- Chief of Staff: Ltc Henry Gassaway Kennett
- Aide de Camp: Col John V. Du Bois

Division	Brigade	Regiments and Others
Second Division; BG David S. Stanley	First Brigade Col John W. Fuller	27th Ohio: Maj Zephaniah Spaulding; 39th Ohio: Col Alfred West Gilbert; 43rd Ohio: Col J. L. Kirby Smith (mw), Ltc Wager Swayne; 63rd Ohio: Col John W. Sprague; Jenks' Company, Illinois Cavalry; Michigan Light Artillery, 3rd Battery: Lt. Carl A. Lambert; Wisconsin Light Artillery, 8th Battery: Lt. John D. McLean; 2nd United States, Battery F: Cpt Thomas D. Maurice
Second Division; BG David S. Stanley	Second Brigade Col Joseph A. Mower (w/c)	26th Illinois: Maj Robert A. Gillmore; 47th Illinois: Col William A. Thrush (k); 5th Minnesota: Col Lucius F. Hubbard; 11th Missouri: Maj Andrew Weber; 8th Wisconsin: Ltc George W. Robbins; Iowa Light Artillery, 2nd Battery: Cpt Nelson T. Spoor
Third Division; BG Charles S. Hamilton Escort: 5th Missouri Cavalry, Company C	First Brigade BG Napoleon B. Buford	48th Indiana: Ltc DeWitt C. Rugg (w), Lt James W. Archer; 59th Indiana: Col Jesse I. Alexander; 5th Iowa: Col Charles L. Matthies; 4th Minnesota: Col John B. Sanborn; 26th Missouri: Ltc John H. Holman (w); Battery M, 1st Missouri Light Artillery: Lt Julius MacMurray; Ohio Light Artillery, 11th Battery: Lt Henry M. Neil
Third Division; BG Charles S. Hamilton Escort: 5th Missouri Cavalry, Company C	Second Brigade BG Jeremiah C. Sullivan (w); Col Samuel A. Holmes	56th Illinois: Ltc Green Berry Raum; 10th Iowa: Maj Nathaniel McCalla; 17th Iowa: Maj Jabez Banbury; 10th Missouri: Col Samuel A. Holmes; 24th Missouri, Company E: Cpt Lafayette M. Rice; 80th Ohio: Maj Richard Lanning (k); Wisconsin Light Artillery, 6th Battery: Cpt Henry Dillon; Wisconsin Light Artillery, 12th Battery: Lt Lorenzo D. Immell
Cavalry Division; Col John K. Mizner	First Brigade Col Edward Hatch	7th Illinois Cavalry: Col Edward Prince; 11th Illinois Cavalry: Col Robert G. Ingersoll; 5th Ohio Cavalry, Companies E, H, I, and K: Cpt Joseph C. Smith
Cavalry Division; Col John K. Mizner	Second Brigade Col Albert L. Lee	2nd Iowa Cavalry: Maj Datus E. Coon; 7th Kansas Cavalry: Ltc T.P. Herrick; 3rd Michigan Cavalry: Cpt Lyman G. Willcox
	Unattached	64th Illinois: Cpt John Morrill; 1st United States Infantry, Companies A, B, C, D, H, and I (siege artillery): Cpt G.A. Williams

=== Army of the Tennessee ===
MG Ulysses S. Grant (not present)
Detachment commanded by BG James B. McPherson

Division	Brigade	Regiments and Others
Second Division; BG Thomas A. Davies	First Brigade BG Pleasant A. Hackleman (mw); Col Thomas W. Sweeny	52nd Illinois: Col Thomas W. Sweeny, Ltc John S. Wilcox; 2nd Iowa: Col James Baker (mw); 7th Iowa: Col Elliott W. Rice; Union Brigade: Ltc John P. Coulter; 58th Illinois (detachment); 8th Iowa (detachment); 12th Iowa (detachment); 14th Iowa (detachment)
Second Division; BG Thomas A. Davies	Second Brigade BG Richard J. Oglesby (w); Col August Mersy	9th Illinois: Col August Mersy; 12th Illinois: Col Augustus L. Chetlain; 22nd Ohio: Col Oliver Wood; 81st Ohio: Col Thomas Morton
Second Division; BG Thomas A. Davies	Third Brigade Col Silas D. Baldwin (w); Col John V. Du Bois	7th Illinois: Col Andrew J. Babcock; 50th Illinois: Ltc William Swarthout; 57th Illinois: Ltc Frederick J. Hurlbut
Second Division; BG Thomas A. Davies	Artillery Maj George H. Stone	Battery D, 1st Missouri Light Artillery: Cpt Henry Richardson; Battery H, 1st Missouri Light Artillery: Cpt Frederick Welker; Battery I, 1st Missouri Light Artillery: Lt Charles Thurber; Battery K, 1st Missouri Light Artillery: Lt Charles Green
Second Division; BG Thomas A. Davies	Unattached	Western Sharpshooters-14th Missouri Volunteers: Col Patrick E. Burke
Sixth Division; BG John McArthur; BG Thomas J. McKean	First Brigade Col Benjamin Allen; BG John McArthur	21st Missouri: Col David Moore; 16th Wisconsin: Maj Thomas Reynolds, Col Benjamin Allen; 17th Wisconsin: Col John L. Doran
Sixth Division; BG John McArthur; BG Thomas J. McKean	Second Brigade Col John M. Oliver	15th Michigan: Ltc John McDermott; 18th Missouri, Companies A, B, C, and E: Cpt Jacob R. Ault; 14th Wisconsin: Col John Hancock; 18th Wisconsin: Col Gabriel Bouck; Ford's Company, Illinois Cavalry: Cpt William Ford
Sixth Division; BG John McArthur; BG Thomas J. McKean	Third Brigade Col Marcellus M. Crocker	11th Iowa: Ltc William Hall; 13th Iowa: Ltc John Shane; 15th Iowa: Ltc William Dewey; 16th Iowa: Ltc Addison J. Sanders (w)
Sixth Division; BG John McArthur; BG Thomas J. McKean	Artillery Cpt Andrew Hickenlooper	2nd Illinois Light Artillery, Battery F: Lt J.W. Mitchell (2 guns); Minnesota Light Artillery, 1st Battery: Lt G.F. Cooke (4 guns); 3rd Battery, Ohio Light Artillery: Cpt Emil Munch (2 guns); 5th Battery, Ohio Light Artillery: Lt B.S. Matson (4 guns); 10th Battery, Ohio Light Artillery: Cpt H.B. White (4 guns)
