= Meridian campaign order of battle: Union =

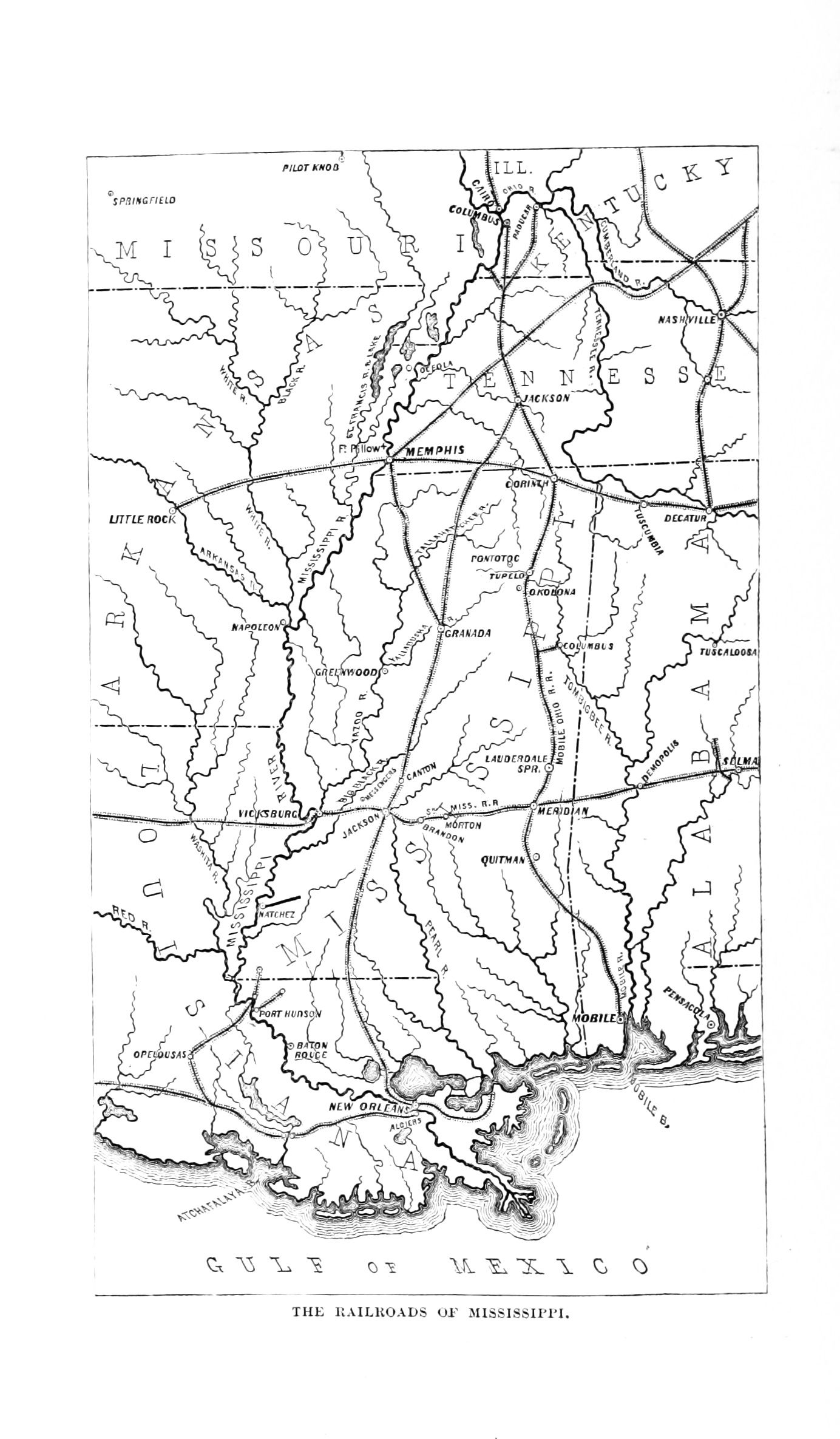
Sherman led his forces west from Vicksburg to capture Meridian and wreck its railroads. A cavalry column moving south from Memphis was defeated at Okolona and withdrew.

The following Union Army units and commanders fought in the Meridian campaign (3 February – 6 March 1864) of the American Civil War. Order of battle was compiled from the army organization during the campaign. The strength numbers listed in the tables are "present for duty".

== Abbreviations used ==
=== Military rank ===
- MG = Major General
- BG = Brigadier General
- Col = Colonel
- Ltc = Lieutenant Colonel
- Maj = Major
- Cpt = Captain
- Lt = Lieutenant

=== Other ===
- w = wounded
- mw = mortally wounded
- k = killed

== Meridian Expedition ==
MG William Tecumseh Sherman

- Escort: 4th Illinois Cavalry Regiment, Company A: Lt Samuel A. Lowe

=== XVI Corps ===
MG Stephen A. Hurlbut

Union order of battle for XVI Corps
Division	Brigade	Unit
First Division; BG James M. Tuttle (Note: Tuttle's 2nd and 3rd Brigades (1st Div., XVI Corps) guarded Big Black River bridge, 4–27 February (Official Records, pp. 168–169).); 174 officers 2,752 men 8 guns	1st Brigade; Col William L. McMillan (Note: McMillan's brigade operated with Smith's cavalry near Memphis, 6–15 February. 1st Brigade strength is not counted in 1st Division total (Official Records, p. 168).)	114th Illinois Infantry Regiment: Col John F. King
First Division; BG James M. Tuttle; 174 officers 2,752 men 8 guns	1st Brigade; Col William L. McMillan	93rd Indiana Infantry Regiment: Maj Samuel S. Crowe
First Division; BG James M. Tuttle; 174 officers 2,752 men 8 guns	1st Brigade; Col William L. McMillan	72nd Ohio Infantry Regiment: Ltc Charles G. Eaton
First Division; BG James M. Tuttle; 174 officers 2,752 men 8 guns	1st Brigade; Col William L. McMillan	95th Ohio Infantry Regiment: Ltc Jefferson Brumback
First Division; BG James M. Tuttle; 174 officers 2,752 men 8 guns	2nd Brigade; BG Joseph A. Mower	47th Illinois Infantry Regiment: Col John D. McClure
First Division; BG James M. Tuttle; 174 officers 2,752 men 8 guns	2nd Brigade; BG Joseph A. Mower	5th Minnesota Infantry Regiment: Col Lucius F. Hubbard
First Division; BG James M. Tuttle; 174 officers 2,752 men 8 guns	2nd Brigade; BG Joseph A. Mower	11th Missouri Infantry Regiment: Ltc William L. Barnum
First Division; BG James M. Tuttle; 174 officers 2,752 men 8 guns	2nd Brigade; BG Joseph A. Mower	8th Wisconsin Infantry Regiment: Ltc John W. Jefferson
First Division; BG James M. Tuttle; 174 officers 2,752 men 8 guns	3rd Brigade; Col James L. Geddes	8th Iowa Infantry Regiment: Ltc William B. Bell
First Division; BG James M. Tuttle; 174 officers 2,752 men 8 guns	3rd Brigade; Col James L. Geddes	12th Iowa Infantry Regiment: Ltc John H. Stibbs
First Division; BG James M. Tuttle; 174 officers 2,752 men 8 guns	3rd Brigade; Col James L. Geddes	35th Iowa Infantry Regiment: Col Sylvester G. Hill
First Division; BG James M. Tuttle; 174 officers 2,752 men 8 guns	Artillery; Cpt Nelson T. Spoor	Battery E, 1st Illinois Artillery: Lt John A Fitch (1st Brigade)
First Division; BG James M. Tuttle; 174 officers 2,752 men 8 guns	Artillery; Cpt Nelson T. Spoor	2nd Independent Iowa Battery: Lt Joseph R. Reed (2nd Brigade)
First Division; BG James M. Tuttle; 174 officers 2,752 men 8 guns	Artillery; Cpt Nelson T. Spoor	6th Independent Indiana Battery: Lt Louis Kern (3rd Brigade)
Third Division; BG Andrew Jackson Smith; 237 officers 4,465 men 14 guns	1st Brigade; Col David Moore	58th Illinois Infantry Regiment: Col William F. Lynch
Third Division; BG Andrew Jackson Smith; 237 officers 4,465 men 14 guns	1st Brigade; Col David Moore	119th Illinois Infantry Regiment: Col Thomas J. Kinney
Third Division; BG Andrew Jackson Smith; 237 officers 4,465 men 14 guns	1st Brigade; Col David Moore	89th Indiana Infantry Regiment: Col Charles D. Murray
Third Division; BG Andrew Jackson Smith; 237 officers 4,465 men 14 guns	1st Brigade; Col David Moore	21st Missouri Infantry Regiment: Maj Edwin Moore
Third Division; BG Andrew Jackson Smith; 237 officers 4,465 men 14 guns	2nd Brigade; Col William T. Shaw	14th Iowa Infantry Regiment: Ltc Joseph H. Newbold
Third Division; BG Andrew Jackson Smith; 237 officers 4,465 men 14 guns	2nd Brigade; Col William T. Shaw	27th Iowa Infantry Regiment: Col James I. Gilbert
Third Division; BG Andrew Jackson Smith; 237 officers 4,465 men 14 guns	2nd Brigade; Col William T. Shaw	32nd Iowa Infantry Regiment: Col John Scott
Third Division; BG Andrew Jackson Smith; 237 officers 4,465 men 14 guns	2nd Brigade; Col William T. Shaw	24th Missouri Infantry Regiment: Col James K. Mills
Third Division; BG Andrew Jackson Smith; 237 officers 4,465 men 14 guns	3rd Brigade; Col Edward H. Wolfe; Col Risdon M. Moore	49th Illinois Infantry Regiment: Ltc William W. Bishop
Third Division; BG Andrew Jackson Smith; 237 officers 4,465 men 14 guns	3rd Brigade; Col Edward H. Wolfe; Col Risdon M. Moore	117th Illinois Infantry Regiment: Col Risdon Moore, Ltc Jonathan Merriam
Third Division; BG Andrew Jackson Smith; 237 officers 4,465 men 14 guns	3rd Brigade; Col Edward H. Wolfe; Col Risdon M. Moore	52nd Indiana Infantry Regiment: Maj William T. Strickland
Third Division; BG Andrew Jackson Smith; 237 officers 4,465 men 14 guns	3rd Brigade; Col Edward H. Wolfe; Col Risdon M. Moore	178th New York Infantry Regiment: Col Edward Wehler
Third Division; BG Andrew Jackson Smith; 237 officers 4,465 men 14 guns	Artillery; Cpt James M. Cockefair	3rd Independent Indiana Battery: Lt Thomas J. Ginn
Third Division; BG Andrew Jackson Smith; 237 officers 4,465 men 14 guns	Artillery; Cpt James M. Cockefair	9th Independent Indiana Battery: Cpt George R. Brown
Third Division; BG Andrew Jackson Smith; 237 officers 4,465 men 14 guns	Artillery; Cpt James M. Cockefair	14th Independent Indiana Battery: Lt Francis W. Morse
Fourth Division; BG James C. Veatch; 102 officers 1,935 men 4 guns	1st Brigade; Col Milton Montgomery	33rd Missouri Infantry Regiment: Ltc William H. Heath
Fourth Division; BG James C. Veatch; 102 officers 1,935 men 4 guns	1st Brigade; Col Milton Montgomery	35th New Jersey Infantry Regiment: Ltc William A. Henry
Fourth Division; BG James C. Veatch; 102 officers 1,935 men 4 guns	1st Brigade; Col Milton Montgomery	25th Wisconsin Infantry Regiment: Ltc Jeremiah M. Rusk
Fourth Division; BG James C. Veatch; 102 officers 1,935 men 4 guns	2nd Brigade; Col James Henry Howe	25th Indiana Infantry Regiment: Ltc John Rheinlander
Fourth Division; BG James C. Veatch; 102 officers 1,935 men 4 guns	2nd Brigade; Col James Henry Howe	17th New York Veteran Infantry Regiment: Col William T. C. Grower
Fourth Division; BG James C. Veatch; 102 officers 1,935 men 4 guns	2nd Brigade; Col James Henry Howe	32nd Wisconsin Infantry Regiment: Maj Charles H. DeGroat
Fourth Division; BG James C. Veatch; 102 officers 1,935 men 4 guns	2nd Brigade; Col James Henry Howe	Battery D, 2nd Illinois Artillery: Cpt Charles S. Cooper

=== XVII Corps ===
MG James B. McPherson

- Escort: 4th Illinois Cavalry Regiment, Companies B, C and D: Cpt Garrett L. Collins
- Escort: 4th Independent Company Ohio Cavalry: Cpt John S. Foster

Union order of battle for XVII Corps
Division	Brigade	Unit
First Division; 88 officers 1,331 men 4 guns	3rd Brigade; BG Alexander Chambers	11th Iowa Infantry Regiment: Col William Hall
First Division; 88 officers 1,331 men 4 guns	3rd Brigade; BG Alexander Chambers	13th Iowa Infantry Regiment: Col John Shane
First Division; 88 officers 1,331 men 4 guns	3rd Brigade; BG Alexander Chambers	15th Iowa Infantry Regiment: Col William W. Belknap
First Division; 88 officers 1,331 men 4 guns	3rd Brigade; BG Alexander Chambers	16th Iowa Infantry Regiment: Ltc Addison H. Sanders
First Division; 88 officers 1,331 men 4 guns	3rd Brigade; BG Alexander Chambers	Batteries C and M, 1st Missouri Artillery: Lt John H. Tiemeyer
Third Division; BG Mortimer D. Leggett; 256 officers 5,133 men 16 guns	1st Brigade; BG Manning F. Force	20th Illinois Infantry Regiment: Ltc Daniel Bradley
Third Division; BG Mortimer D. Leggett; 256 officers 5,133 men 16 guns	1st Brigade; BG Manning F. Force	31st Illinois Infantry Regiment: Ltc Robert N. Pearson
Third Division; BG Mortimer D. Leggett; 256 officers 5,133 men 16 guns	1st Brigade; BG Manning F. Force	45th Illinois Infantry Regiment: Maj John O. Duer
Third Division; BG Mortimer D. Leggett; 256 officers 5,133 men 16 guns	1st Brigade; BG Manning F. Force	124th Illinois Infantry Regiment: Ltc John H. Howe
Third Division; BG Mortimer D. Leggett; 256 officers 5,133 men 16 guns	2nd Brigade; Col Benjamin F. Potts	20th Ohio Infantry Regiment: Ltc John C. Fry
Third Division; BG Mortimer D. Leggett; 256 officers 5,133 men 16 guns	2nd Brigade; Col Benjamin F. Potts	32nd Ohio Infantry Regiment: Ltc Jefferson J. Hibbets
Third Division; BG Mortimer D. Leggett; 256 officers 5,133 men 16 guns	2nd Brigade; Col Benjamin F. Potts	68th Ohio Infantry Regiment: Ltc George E. Welles
Third Division; BG Mortimer D. Leggett; 256 officers 5,133 men 16 guns	2nd Brigade; Col Benjamin F. Potts	78th Ohio Infantry Regiment: Ltc Greenberry F. Wiles
Third Division; BG Mortimer D. Leggett; 256 officers 5,133 men 16 guns	3rd Brigade; BG Jasper A. Maltby	8th Illinois Infantry Regiment: Ltc Josiah A. Sheetz
Third Division; BG Mortimer D. Leggett; 256 officers 5,133 men 16 guns	3rd Brigade; BG Jasper A. Maltby	17th Illinois Infantry Regiment: Ltc Francis M. Smith
Third Division; BG Mortimer D. Leggett; 256 officers 5,133 men 16 guns	3rd Brigade; BG Jasper A. Maltby	30th Illinois Infantry Regiment: Col Warren Shedd
Third Division; BG Mortimer D. Leggett; 256 officers 5,133 men 16 guns	3rd Brigade; BG Jasper A. Maltby	7th Missouri Infantry Regiment: Col William S. Oliver
Third Division; BG Mortimer D. Leggett; 256 officers 5,133 men 16 guns	Artillery; Cpt William S. Williams	Battery H, 1st Michigan Artillery: Lt Marcus D. Elliott
Third Division; BG Mortimer D. Leggett; 256 officers 5,133 men 16 guns	Artillery; Cpt William S. Williams	3rd Ohio Independent Battery: Lt Thomas J. Blackburn
Third Division; BG Mortimer D. Leggett; 256 officers 5,133 men 16 guns	Artillery; Cpt William S. Williams	26th Ohio Independent Battery (detachment): attached to 3rd Ohio
Third Division; BG Mortimer D. Leggett; 256 officers 5,133 men 16 guns	Escort	2nd Wisconsin Cavalry Regiment, Company H: Cpt Ernest J. Meyers
Fourth Division; BG Marcellus M. Crocker; 219 officers 4,832 men 16 guns	1st Brigade; BG Thomas Kilby Smith	41st Illinois Infantry Regiment: Ltc John H. Nale
Fourth Division; BG Marcellus M. Crocker; 219 officers 4,832 men 16 guns	1st Brigade; BG Thomas Kilby Smith	53rd Illinois Infantry Regiment: Maj Rolland H. Allison
Fourth Division; BG Marcellus M. Crocker; 219 officers 4,832 men 16 guns	1st Brigade; BG Thomas Kilby Smith	3rd Iowa Infantry Regiment: Maj George W. Crosley
Fourth Division; BG Marcellus M. Crocker; 219 officers 4,832 men 16 guns	1st Brigade; BG Thomas Kilby Smith	33rd Wisconsin Infantry Regiment: Col Jonathan B. Moore
Fourth Division; BG Marcellus M. Crocker; 219 officers 4,832 men 16 guns	2nd Brigade; Col Cyrus Hall	14th Illinois Infantry Regiment: Maj John F. Nolte
Fourth Division; BG Marcellus M. Crocker; 219 officers 4,832 men 16 guns	2nd Brigade; Col Cyrus Hall	15th Illinois Infantry Regiment: Col George C. Rogers
Fourth Division; BG Marcellus M. Crocker; 219 officers 4,832 men 16 guns	2nd Brigade; Col Cyrus Hall	76th Illinois Infantry Regiment: Ltc Charles C. Jones
Fourth Division; BG Marcellus M. Crocker; 219 officers 4,832 men 16 guns	3rd Brigade; BG Walter Q. Gresham	32nd Illinois Infantry Regiment: Ltc George H. English
Fourth Division; BG Marcellus M. Crocker; 219 officers 4,832 men 16 guns	3rd Brigade; BG Walter Q. Gresham	23rd Indiana Infantry Regiment: Ltc William P. Davis
Fourth Division; BG Marcellus M. Crocker; 219 officers 4,832 men 16 guns	3rd Brigade; BG Walter Q. Gresham	53rd Indiana Infantry Regiment: Ltc William Jones
Fourth Division; BG Marcellus M. Crocker; 219 officers 4,832 men 16 guns	3rd Brigade; BG Walter Q. Gresham	12th Wisconsin Infantry Regiment: Ltc James K. Proudfit
Fourth Division; BG Marcellus M. Crocker; 219 officers 4,832 men 16 guns	Artillery; Cpt John Wesley Powell	Battery F, 2nd Illinois Artillery: Lt Walter H. Powell
Fourth Division; BG Marcellus M. Crocker; 219 officers 4,832 men 16 guns	Artillery; Cpt John Wesley Powell	7th Ohio Independent Battery: Lt Harlow P. McNaughton
Fourth Division; BG Marcellus M. Crocker; 219 officers 4,832 men 16 guns	Artillery; Cpt John Wesley Powell	15th Ohio Independent Battery: Cpt Edward Spear Jr.
Fourth Division; BG Marcellus M. Crocker; 219 officers 4,832 men 16 guns	Escort	11th Illinois Cavalry Regiment, Company G: Cpt Stephen S. Tripp
Cavalry; 81 officers 1,871 men 4 guns	Brigade; Col Edward F. Winslow	5th Illinois Cavalry Regiment: Maj Abel H. Seley
Cavalry; 81 officers 1,871 men 4 guns	Brigade; Col Edward F. Winslow	11th Illinois Cavalry Regiment: Ltc Lucien H. Kerr
Cavalry; 81 officers 1,871 men 4 guns	Brigade; Col Edward F. Winslow	4th Iowa Cavalry Regiment: Ltc John H. Peters
Cavalry; 81 officers 1,871 men 4 guns	Brigade; Col Edward F. Winslow	10th Missouri Cavalry Regiment: Ltc Frederick W. Benteen

== Smith's Column ==
BG William Sooy Smith

Union order of battle for W. Sooy Smith's column
Division	Brigade	Unit
Cavalry Division; BG Benjamin H. Grierson; 292 officers 6,312 men 12 guns	1st Brigade; Col George E. Waring Jr.	2nd Illinois Cavalry Regiment (5 companies): Cpt Franklin Moore
Cavalry Division; BG Benjamin H. Grierson; 292 officers 6,312 men 12 guns	1st Brigade; Col George E. Waring Jr.	7th Indiana Cavalry Regiment: Cpt Franklin Moore, Col John P. C. Shanks
Cavalry Division; BG Benjamin H. Grierson; 292 officers 6,312 men 12 guns	1st Brigade; Col George E. Waring Jr.	4th Missouri Cavalry Regiment: Maj Gustav Heinrichs
Cavalry Division; BG Benjamin H. Grierson; 292 officers 6,312 men 12 guns	1st Brigade; Col George E. Waring Jr.	2nd New Jersey Cavalry Regiment: Col Joseph Kargé
Cavalry Division; BG Benjamin H. Grierson; 292 officers 6,312 men 12 guns	1st Brigade; Col George E. Waring Jr.	19th Pennsylvania Cavalry Regiment: Ltc Joseph C. Hess
Cavalry Division; BG Benjamin H. Grierson; 292 officers 6,312 men 12 guns	2nd Brigade; Col William Peters Hepburn	6th Illinois Cavalry Regiment: Ltc Mathew H. Starr
Cavalry Division; BG Benjamin H. Grierson; 292 officers 6,312 men 12 guns	2nd Brigade; Col William Peters Hepburn	7th Illinois Cavalry Regiment: Ltc George W. Trafton
Cavalry Division; BG Benjamin H. Grierson; 292 officers 6,312 men 12 guns	2nd Brigade; Col William Peters Hepburn	9th Illinois Cavalry Regiment: Ltc Henry B. Burgh
Cavalry Division; BG Benjamin H. Grierson; 292 officers 6,312 men 12 guns	2nd Brigade; Col William Peters Hepburn	2nd Iowa Cavalry Regiment: Maj Datus E. Coon
Cavalry Division; BG Benjamin H. Grierson; 292 officers 6,312 men 12 guns	2nd Brigade; Col William Peters Hepburn	Battery K, 1st Illinois Artillery: Lt Isaac W. Curtis
Cavalry Division; BG Benjamin H. Grierson; 292 officers 6,312 men 12 guns	3rd Brigade; Col Lafayette McCrillis	3rd Illinois Cavalry Regiment (5 companies): Cpt Andrew B. Kirkbride
Cavalry Division; BG Benjamin H. Grierson; 292 officers 6,312 men 12 guns	3rd Brigade; Col Lafayette McCrillis	72nd Indiana Infantry Regiment (mounted): Maj Henry M. Carr
Cavalry Division; BG Benjamin H. Grierson; 292 officers 6,312 men 12 guns	3rd Brigade; Col Lafayette McCrillis	5th Kentucky Cavalry Regiment: Maj Christopher T. Cheek
Cavalry Division; BG Benjamin H. Grierson; 292 officers 6,312 men 12 guns	3rd Brigade; Col Lafayette McCrillis	2nd Tennessee Cavalry Regiment: Ltc William R. Cook
Cavalry Division; BG Benjamin H. Grierson; 292 officers 6,312 men 12 guns	3rd Brigade; Col Lafayette McCrillis	3rd Tennessee Cavalry Regiment: Maj John B. Minnis
Cavalry Division; BG Benjamin H. Grierson; 292 officers 6,312 men 12 guns	3rd Brigade; Col Lafayette McCrillis	4th Tennessee Cavalry Regiment: Ltc Jacob M. Thornburgh
Cavalry Division; BG Benjamin H. Grierson; 292 officers 6,312 men 12 guns	Unattached	4th US Cavalry Regiment: Cpt Charles S. Bowman (Note: The 4th US Cavalry had 13 officers and 378 men present for duty. They are included in the division totals (Official Records, p. 172).)

== Yazoo Expedition ==
Col James Henry Coates

Union order of battle for Yazoo expedition
Brigade	Unit
Brigade; Col James Henry Coates	11th Illinois Infantry Regiment: Maj George C. McKee
Brigade; Col James Henry Coates	8th Louisiana Infantry Regiment (African Descent): Ltc Ferdinand E. Peebles
Brigade; Col James Henry Coates	1st Mississippi Cavalry Regiment (African Descent): Col Embury D. Osband
