= Battle of Atlanta order of battle: Union =

The following Union Army units and commanders fought in the Battle of Atlanta (July 22, 1864) of the American Civil War. The Confederate order of battle is listed separately.

== Abbreviations used ==
=== Military rank ===
- MG = Major general
- BG = Brigadier general
- Col = Colonel
- Maj = Major
- Cpt = Captain

=== Other ===
- w = Wounded
- k = Killed

== Military Division of the Mississippi ==
MG William T. Sherman

=== Army of the Tennessee ===
MG James B. McPherson (k)
MG John A. Logan

==== XV Corps ====
MG John A. Logan
BG Morgan L. Smith

| Division | Brigade | Regiments and others |
|---|---|---|
| First Division; BG Charles R. Woods | 1st Brigade Col Milo Smith | 26th Iowa; 30th Iowa; 76th Ohio |
| First Division; BG Charles R. Woods | 2nd Brigade Col James A. Williamson | 4th Iowa; 9th Iowa; 25th Iowa; 31st Iowa |
| First Division; BG Charles R. Woods | 3rd Brigade Col Hugo A. von Wangelin (w) | 3rd Missouri; 12th Missouri; 17th Missouri; 31st Missouri; 32nd Missouri |
| First Division; BG Charles R. Woods | Artillery Maj Clemens Landgraeber | Battery F, 2nd Missouri Light Artillery; 4th Battery, Ohio Light Artillery |
| Second Division; BG Morgan L. Smith; BG Joseph A. J. Lightburn | 1st Brigade Col James S. Martin | 55th Illinois; 111th Illinois; 116th Illinois; 6th Missouri; 8th Missouri |
| Second Division; BG Morgan L. Smith; BG Joseph A. J. Lightburn | 2nd Brigade BG Joseph Lightburn; Col Wells S. Jones | 83rd Indiana; 30th Ohio; 37th Ohio; 47th Ohio; 53rd Ohio; 54th Ohio |
| Second Division; BG Morgan L. Smith; BG Joseph A. J. Lightburn | Artillery Cpt Francis DeGress | Battery A, 1st Illinois Light Artillery; Battery B, 1st Illinois Light Artillery; Battery H, 1st Illinois Light Artillery |
| Fourth Division; BG William Harrow | 1st Brigade Col Reuben Williams | 26th Illinois; 90th Illinois; 100th Illinois; 12th Indiana |
| Fourth Division; BG William Harrow | 2nd Brigade Col Charles C. Walcutt | 40th Illinois; 103rd Illinois; 97th Indiana; 6th Iowa; 46th Ohio |
| Fourth Division; BG William Harrow | 3rd Brigade Col John M. Oliver | 48th Illinois; 99th Indiana; 15th Michigan; 70th Ohio |
| Fourth Division; BG William Harrow | Artillery Cpt Henry H. Griffiths | Battery F, 1st Illinois Light Artillery; 1st Battery, Iowa Light Artillery |

==== XVI Corps (left wing) ====
MG Grenville M. Dodge

| Division | Brigade | Regiments and others |
|---|---|---|
| Second Division; BG Thomas W. Sweeny | 1st Brigade BG Elliott W. Rice | 52nd Illinois; 66th Indiana; 2nd Iowa; 7th Iowa |
| Second Division; BG Thomas W. Sweeny | 2nd Brigade Col August Mersey (w); Ltc Robert N. Adams | 9th Illinois (Mounted); 12th Illinois; 66th Illinois; 81st Ohio |
| Second Division; BG Thomas W. Sweeny | 3rd Brigade BG William Vandever (garrison duty at Rome) | 7th Illinois; 50th Illinois; 57th Illinois; 39th Iowa |
| Second Division; BG Thomas W. Sweeny | Artillery Cpt Frederick Welker | Battery H, 1st Missouri Light Artillery |
| Fourth Division; BG John W. Fuller | 1st Brigade Col John Morrill | 64th Illinois; 18th Missouri; 27th Ohio; 39th Ohio |
| Fourth Division; BG John W. Fuller | 2nd Brigade Col John W. Sprague (engaged at Decatur) | 35th New Jersey; 43rd Ohio; 63rd Ohio; 25th Wisconsin |
| Fourth Division; BG John W. Fuller | Artillery Cpt Jerome B. Burrows | Battery C, 1st Michigan Light Artillery; Battery F, 2nd U.S. Light Artillery |

==== XVII Corps ====
MG Francis P. Blair Jr.

| Division | Brigade | Regiments and others |
|---|---|---|
| Third Division; BG Mortimer D. Leggett | 1st Brigade BG Manning F. Force (w); Col George E. Bryant | 20th Illinois; 30th Illinois; 31st Illinois; 12th Wisconsin; 16th Wisconsin |
| Third Division; BG Mortimer D. Leggett | 2nd Brigade Col Robert K. Scott (w); Ltc Greenbury F. Wiles | 20th Ohio; 68th Ohio; 78th Ohio |
| Third Division; BG Mortimer D. Leggett | 3rd Brigade Col Adam G. Malloy | 17th Wisconsin; Worden's Battalion; Detachment, 14th Wisconsin; Detachment, 81st Illinois; Detachment, 95th Illinois |
| Third Division; BG Mortimer D. Leggett | Artillery Cpt William S. Williams | Battery D, 1st Illinois Light Artillery; Battery H, 1st Michigan Light Artillery; 3rd Battery, Ohio Light Artillery |
| Fourth Division; BG Giles A. Smith | 1st Brigade Col Benjamin F. Potts | 32nd Illinois; 23rd Indiana; 53rd Indiana; 3rd Iowa; 32nd Ohio |
| Fourth Division; BG Giles A. Smith | 2nd Brigade Col John A. Logan (on garrison duty in northern Georgia) | 14th Illinois; 15th Illinois; 41st Illinois |
| Fourth Division; BG Giles A. Smith | 3rd Brigade Col William Hall | 11th Iowa; 13th Iowa; 15th Iowa; 16th Iowa |
| Fourth Division; BG Giles A. Smith | Artillery Cpt Edward Spear | Battery F, 2nd Illinois Light Artillery; 1st Battery, Minnesota Light Artillery; 15th Battery, Ohio Light Artillery |
