= James Archer =

James Archer may refer to:

- James C. Archer (1900–1980), Administrator of the Northern Territory
- James J. Archer (1817–1864), American Civil War general
- James J. Archer (Maryland politician) (1860–1921), American politician and lawyer
- James T. Archer (1819–1859), Florida Attorney General and Secretary of State of Florida
- James W. Archer (1828–1908), American soldier and Medal of Honor recipient
- James Archer (artist) (1823–1904), Scottish portrait painter
- James Archer (Jesuit) (1550–1620), Irish member of the Society of Jesus
- James Archer (preacher) (1751–1834), English Catholic preacher
- James Archer (rugby union), (1900–1979), New Zealand rugby union player
- James Archer (stock trader) (born 1974), son of Jeffrey Archer, politician
- James Archer (born 1850), shipwreck survivor charged with murder in a precursor to the case of R v Dudley and Stephens
- Jimmy Archer (1883–1958), Major League Baseball catcher
- Jamie Archer (born c. 1975), British singer
