= Atlanta order of battle =

Atlanta order of battle may refer to:

- Atlanta campaign order of battle
- Battle of Atlanta order of battle

== See also ==
- Atlanta (disambiguation)
