= Pitt B. Herington =

American Civil War Medal of Honor recipient

- Born: February 5, 1841; Michigan
- Died: January 15, 1919 (aged 77)
- Burial place: Clinton, Illinois
- Military career
- Allegiance: United States
- Branch: United States Army
- Rank: Private
- Units: Company E, 11th Iowa Volunteer Infantry Regiment
- Conflicts: American Civil War
- Awards: Medal of Honor

Pitt B. Herington (February 5, 1841 - January 15, 1919) was a Union Army soldier in the American Civil War who received the U.S. military's highest decoration, the Medal of Honor.

Herington was born in Michigan on February 5, 1841, and entered service at Tipton, Iowa. He was awarded the Medal of Honor, for extraordinary heroism on June 15, 1864, while serving as a Private with Company E, 11th Iowa Volunteer Infantry Regiment, at Kennesaw Mountain, Georgia. His Medal of Honor was issued, on November 27, 1899.

He died at the age of 77, on January 15, 1919, and was buried at the Memorial Park Cemetery in Clinton, Illinois.

== Medal of Honor citation ==
The President of the United States of America, in the name of Congress, takes pleasure in presenting the Medal of Honor to Private Pitt B. Herington, United States Army, for extraordinary heroism on 15 June 1864, while serving with Company E, 11th Iowa Infantry, in action at Kenesaw Mountain, Georgia. With one companion and under a fierce fire of the enemy at close range, Private Herington went to the rescue of a wounded comrade who had fallen between the lines and carried him to a place of safety.
