= Col. John Q. and Rowena (Camp) Wilds House =

Historic house in Iowa, United States

- U.S. National Register of Historic Places
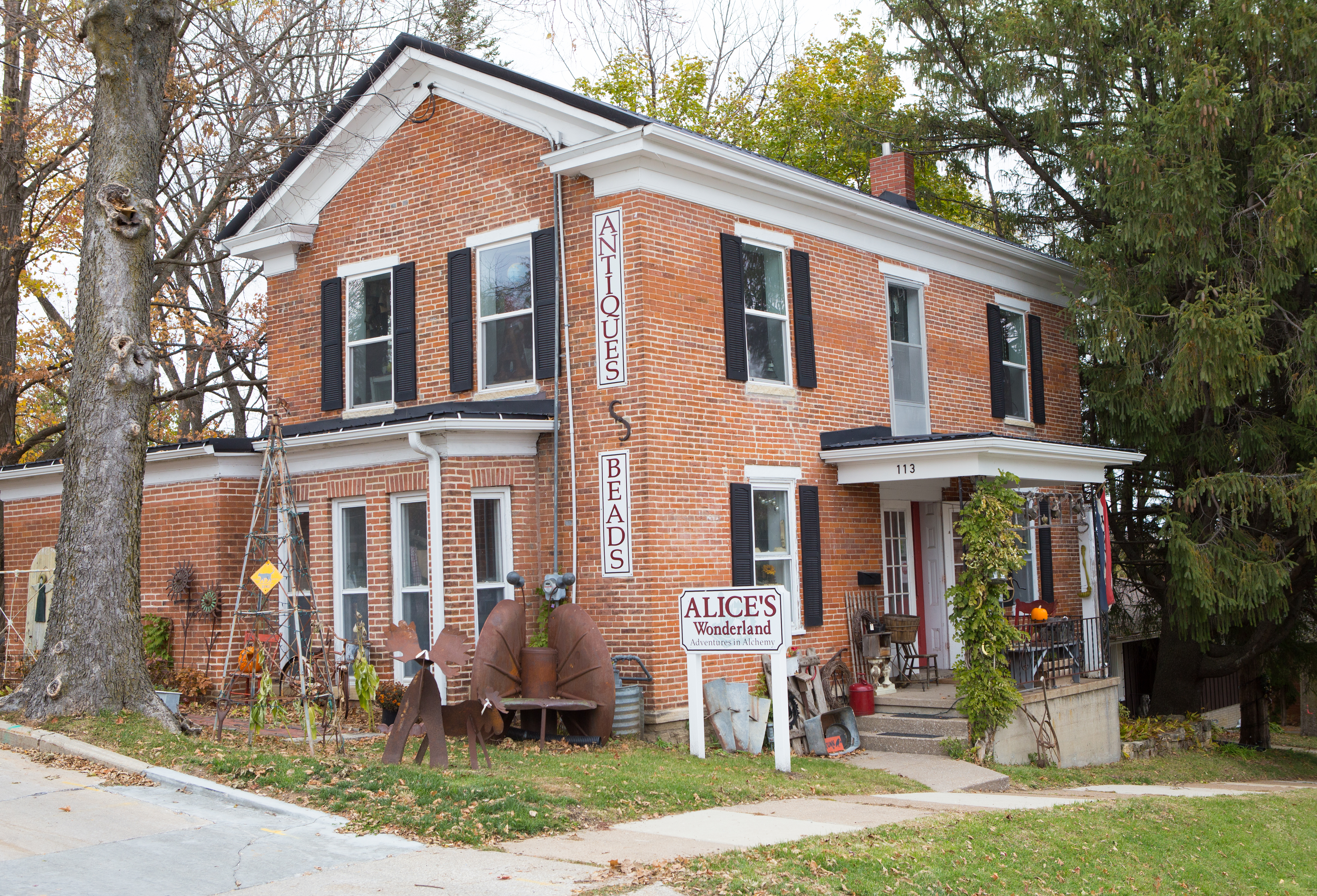

- Location within Iowa Location within the United States
- Location: 113 2nd Ave. NW; Mount Vernon, Iowa
- Coordinates: 41°55′24″N 91°25′04″W
- Area: less than one acre
- Built: 1857
- Built by: Henry D. Albright; William D. Albright
- MPS: Mount Vernon MPS
- NRHP reference No.: 100005490
- Added to NRHP: August 27, 2020

The Col. John Q. and Rowena (Camp) Wilds House, also known as the James and Ruth (King) Smith House, is a historic building located in Mount Vernon, Iowa, United States. It is significant with the settlement of the city that was influenced by the establishment of the Military Road, for being constructed of locally made brick and locally quarried limestone, and its vernacular architectural techniques. A native of Fulton County, Pennsylvania, John Wilds settled in Mount Vernon in 1853, opened a general store, and invested in real estate. He married Rowena Camp and they had two daughters. Wilds had this house built in 1857. It was probably built by brothers Henry and William Albright, the town's earliest masons. The two-story, brick structure exhibits elements of Early Republic influences. John Wilds grew wealthy and bought a gristmill. He sold the mill in 1860 and with the outbreak of the American Civil War he volunteered for the 13th Iowa Infantry Regiment. He rose to the rank of Colonel. He was wounded at the Battle of Cedar Creek and died a week later. His wife and two daughters died of illnesses around the same time. The house was listed on the National Register of Historic Places in 2020.
