= Second Corinth order of battle =

Second Corinth order of battle may refer to:

- Second Corinth Confederate order of battle
- Second Corinth Union order of battle
