= Battle of Atlanta order of battle =

List of lists

The order of battle for the Battle of Atlanta includes:

- Battle of Atlanta order of battle: Confederate
- Battle of Atlanta order of battle: Union

== See also ==
- Atlanta campaign order of battle
