= Battery F, 2nd Illinois Light Artillery Regiment =

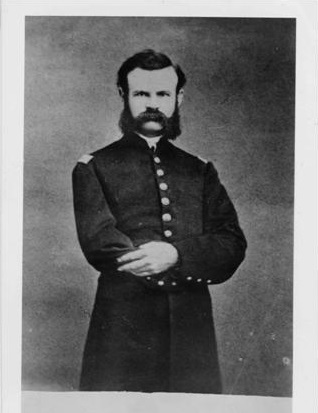
- John Wesley Powell commanded Battery F
- Active: 11 Dec. 1861 – 27 July 1865
- Country: United States
- Allegiance: (United States) Union; Illinois
- Branch: Union Army
- Type: Field Artillery
- Size: Artillery Battery
- Equipment: 6 x M1841 6-pounder field guns (Apr. 1862)
- Engagements: American Civil War; Battle of Shiloh (1862); Siege of Corinth (1862); Second Battle of Corinth (1862); Siege of Vicksburg (1863); Jackson Expedition (1863); Atlanta campaign (1864); Battle of Kennesaw Mountain (1864); Battle of Atlanta (1864); Battle of Jonesborough (1864); Battle of Nashville (1864)

Commanders
- Notable commanders: John Wesley Powell

Battery F, 2nd Illinois Light Artillery Regiment was an artillery battery from Illinois that served in the Union Army during the American Civil War. The battery was organized in December 1861 at Cape Girardeau, Missouri. The unit fought at Shiloh, First Corinth, and Second Corinth in 1862 and at Vicksburg and Jackson in 1863. The battery served in the Atlanta campaign and at Nashville in 1864. It was mustered out of federal service in July 1865. The battery's first commander was John Wesley Powell who later led an exploration of the Grand Canyon.

== Formation ==
Battery F, 2nd Illinois Light Artillery formed at Cape Girardeau, Missouri, and mustered into federal service on 11 December 1861. The original officers were Captain John Wesley Powell of Hennepin, Illinois, First Lieutenants Michael Dittlenger of Cape Girardeau and Christian D. Bless of Lewistown, Illinois, and Second Lieutenants Gustavus A. Tirmenstein of Cape Girardeau and Joseph W. Mitchell of Bloomfield, Missouri. Rank and file included 1 first sergeant, 4 sergeants, 5 corporals, and 128 privates. The privates were from Missouri and mostly from Cape Girardeau. Powell was promoted to major on 1 September 1864. Powell survived the war and led the first successful voyage through the Grand Canyon in 1869. Powell was replaced as captain by Walter H. Powell of Macon County, Illinois. W. H. Powell mustered out on 15 May 1865 and was replaced as captain by George R. Richardson.

Battery F was part of the 2nd Illinois Light Artillery Regiment which organized at Camp Douglas in Chicago, Camp Butler in Springfield, Peoria, St. Charles, and Cairo, Illinois. There were 12 batteries named A–M, not including J. The various batteries belonging to the regiment formed between 17 August 1861 and 6 June 1862, and enlisted for three years' service. Each battery in the regiment served independently of the others. When each battery's term of service expired, the men were mustered out, except for soldiers who re-enlisted as veterans and new recruits. The 2nd Regiment's original commander was Colonel Thomas S. Mather.

== History ==
=== Shiloh and Corinth ===
Battery F was attached to the District of Cairo, Department of Missouri from its formation until April 1862. The battery garrisoned Forts A and B at Cape Girardeau until 14 March 1862, when it was ordered to travel to Pittsburg Landing, Tennessee. Under the command of J. W. Powell, Battery F fought at the Battle of Shiloh on 6–7 April as an unassigned unit in the Army of the Tennessee under the command of Brigadier General Ulysses S. Grant. The unit went into action equipped with six M1841 6-pounder field guns. By 6:00 pm on the first day, the battery lost two guns and 29 horses.

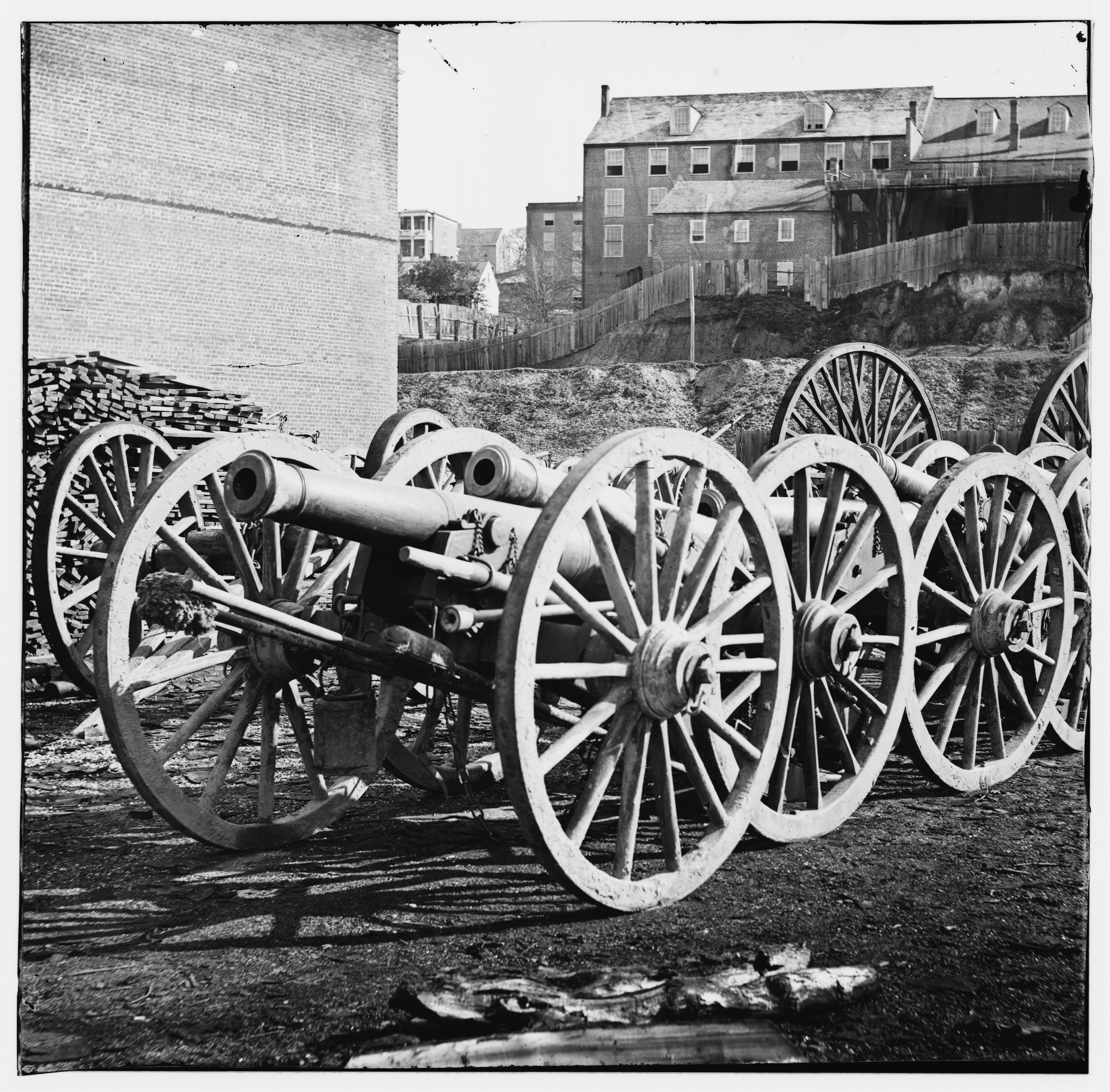
M1841 6-pounder field guns

Battery F went into action with W. H. L. Wallace's division. It first unlimbered in Duncan Field, but the position was badly exposed and the battery withdrew, abandoning one gun. The unit repositioned on a ridge behind the Hornet's Nest along with Richardson's Battery D, Welker's Battery H, and Stone's Battery K, 1st Missouri Light Artillery Regiment. Powell was wounded at 3:00 pm. By this hour, Battery F was shifted to support Stephen A. Hurlbut's division on the left flank. As Powell raised his right hand as a signal to stand clear, his forearm was struck by a bullet. He wrote that he hardly noticed the injury until he tried to mount his horse. Later, part of the arm was amputated. Hurlbut's troops pulled back to the final line of defense. Grant's chief of staff Colonel Joseph Dana Webster placed Battery F on the left flank of the final defense line, in their original campsite near Pittsburg Landing and next to Silversparre's Battery H, 1st Illinois Light Artillery. At Shiloh, the battery reported losses of 1 officer and 5 enlisted men wounded, and 3 enlisted men missing.

From April to July 1862, Battery F was part of the 6th Division, Army of the Tennessee. The battery participated in the advance to and Siege of Corinth in the period 29 April–30 May. After the siege, the unit remained in garrison in Corinth until October. However, one section was sent to Bolivar, Tennessee. From July to November 1862, Battery F was assigned to Artillery, 6th Division, District of Corinth. The battery fought at the Battle of Corinth on 3–4 October 1862 under the command of Lieutenant J. W. Mitchell, as part of Brigadier Thomas J. McKean's 6th Division. According to the report of McKean's artillery chief, Andrew Hickenlooper, Battery F had four guns, but that two of the guns were detached at Bolivar.

Battery F and the 17th Wisconsin Infantry Regiment were placed in reserve until 2:00 pm on 3 October. At that hour, the two units were committed to the battle on the left flank. The 2-gun section of Battery F was placed in front of the 17th Wisconsin and began taking casualties in horses as the Confederates advanced. Brigadier General John McArthur took command of an ad hoc group of Union infantry regiments and ordered an attack. It was initially successful, but the Confederates counterattacked, and the Union troops retreated. At about 3:30 pm, the two guns of Battery F supported Colonel Marcellus M. Crocker's brigade before it withdrew within the final defenses. On 4 October, Battery F defended a part of the line which was not attacked. Historian Frederick H. Dyer stated that the Bolivar section of Battery F fought at the Battle of Hatchie's Bridge on 5 October 1862, but Peter Cozzens did not include it in his account of the action or in his order of battle. On 5–12 October, the battery pursued the Confederates to Ripley, Mississippi.

=== Vicksburg ===
In November–December 1862, Battery F was attached to Artillery, 3rd Division, Right Wing XIII Corps, Department of the Tennessee. In December 1862 – January 1863, the battery became part of Artillery, 6th Division, XVI Corps. During this period, the unit participated in Major General Grant's Central Mississippi Campaign, including a reconnaissance from La Grange, Tennessee, on 8–9 November. In January–August 1863, Battery F was assigned to Artillery, 6th Division, XVII Corps. From 12 January to 6 February, the battery was on duty at Moscow, and Memphis, Tennessee. On 6–10 February, the unit moved to Lake Providence, Louisiana, where it remained until 22 April. On the latter date, Battery F moved to Milliken's Bend.

Battery F commenced its participation in the Vicksburg campaign when it moved to Bruinsburg, Mississippi, on 25–30 April 1863. The battery engaged in the Siege of Vicksburg from 18 May to 4 July, including the 19 and 22 May assaults. For the campaign, Battery F under Captain J. W. Powell was in McArthur's 6th Division, Major General James B. McPherson's XVII Corps. After the capture of Vicksburg, the battery took part in the Jackson Expedition. On 5–10 July, the unit marched to Jackson, Mississippi, and on 10–17 July, it engaged in the siege of Jackson, Mississippi. From August 1863 to November 1864, Battery F formed part of Artillery, 4th Division, XVII Corps. On 15 August, Battery F moved to Natchez, Mississippi where it remained on duty until February 1864. From Natchez, it joined an expedition to Harrisonburg, Louisiana, on 1–7 September 1863, including the capture of Fort Beauregard on 4 September. From 2 February–3 March 1864, Battery F participated in the Meridian Campaign, after which it garrisoned Vicksburg until April.

=== Atlanta and Nashville ===
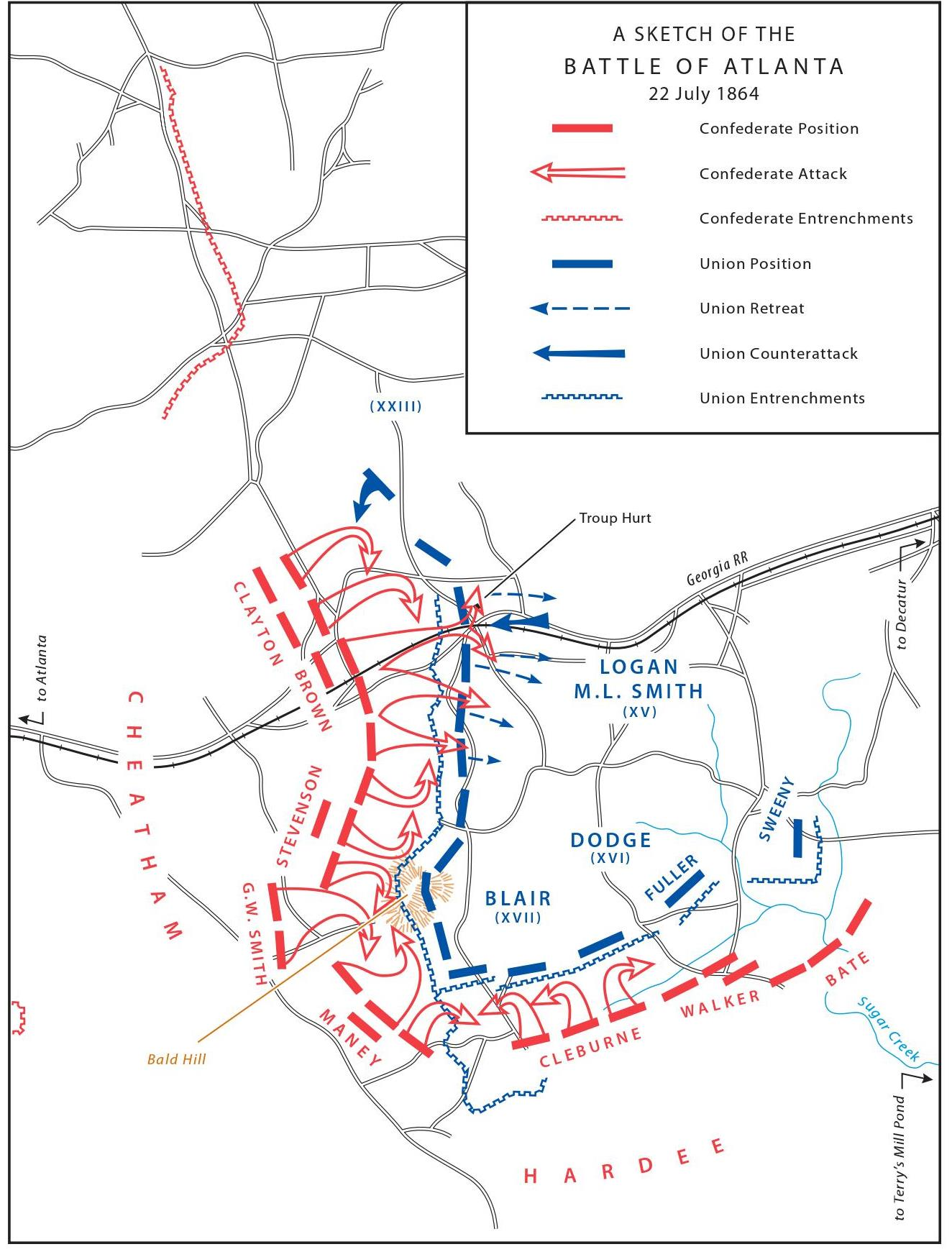
Battle of Atlanta, 22 July 1864

On 28 April 1864, Battery F left Vicksburg and traveled up the Mississippi River to Cairo. From there, the battery moved first to Clifton, Tennessee, then to Huntsville and Decatur, Alabama, and finally to Rome and Acworth, Georgia, which it reached on 8 June. From that date until 8 September, the unit took part in the Atlanta campaign. Battery F fought at the Battle of Marietta starting on 10 June and the Battle of Kennesaw Mountain on 27 June. There was more action at Nickjack Creek on 2–5 July, at the Chattahoochee River on 6–17 July, and at Bald Hill on 20–21 July. Battery F was seriously engaged at the Battle of Atlanta on 22 July, suffering the loss of 1 officer and 32 men killed, wounded, or missing. The battery was involved in various actions during the siege of Atlanta, participated in the flank march of 25–30 August, and fought in the Battle of Jonesborough on 31 August–1 September. During the Atlanta campaign, Battery F under W. H. Powell was in the 4th Division which was led by Brigadier Generals Walter Q. Gresham and Giles Alexander Smith, while Major General Francis Preston Blair Jr. led the XVII Corps.

After operations on 2–6 September 1864 at Lovejoy's Station, Battery F participated in a campaign against the Confederate army in northern Georgia and northern Alabama from 29 September to 3 November. Skirmishes were fought at Shadow Church and Westbrook's near Fairburn, Georgia, on 2 October. The battery was ordered to report to Nashville, Tennessee, in November 1864 and it was transferred from XVIII Corps to Artillery Reserve, Nashville from November 1864 to March 1865. The order of battle in Battles and Leaders of the Civil War does not show that Battery F fought in the Battle of Nashville on 15–16 December 1864. Nevertheless, both Dyer and the Illinois Adjutant General's Report state that Battery F fought at Nashville.

From March to July 1865, Battery F was assigned to the 5th Sub-District, District of Middle Tennessee. The battery's soldiers were mustered out of federal service on 27 July 1865. During service, 5 enlisted men were killed or fatally wounded in action and 24 enlisted men died from disease, for a total of 29 deaths. At discharge, the battery's officers were Captain Richardson and Second Lieutenants Richard Osborn and Alfred S. Looker.

== See also ==
- List of Illinois Civil War units
