= James Archer (preacher) =

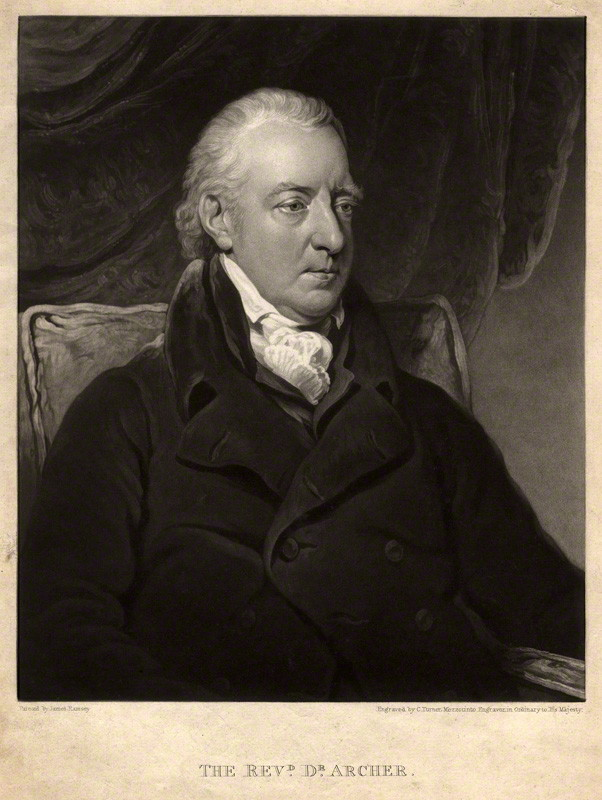
James Archer

James Archer, D.D. (1751–1834) was an English Roman Catholic preacher.

== Life ==
The son of Peter Archer and his wife Bridget Lahey, he attended Douai College from 1769, and was ordained in 1780, the year of the Gordon Riots. He shortly started to preach in London.

Archer was chaplain to the Bavarian minister in London, until 1826. He was created D.D. by Pope Pius VII on 24 August 1821, at the same time as John Lingard. Bishop Milner, in a pastoral (1813), denounced Archer's sermons, which were conciliatory in tone, and forbade them to be publicly read in the chapels of his district.

Archer continued to preach to crowded audiences, and his pulpit eloquence was greatly admired, though it appears to have been somewhat stilted and artificial, according to the fashion set by Dr. Hugh Blair. Charles Butler, writing in 1822 of his sermons, remarks:

"It has been his aim to satisfy reason, whilst he pleased, charmed, and instructed her; to impress upon the mind just notions of the mysteries and truths of the Gospel; and to show that the ways of virtue are the ways of pleasantness, and her paths the paths of peace. No one has returned from any of his sermons without impressions favourable to virtue, or without some practical lesson which through life, probably in a few days, perhaps even in a few hours, it would be useful for him to remember. When we recollect that this is the fortieth year of Mr. Archer's predication, that he has preached oftener than fifty-two times in every year, and that in the present his hearers hang on all he says with the same avidity as they did in the first, we may think it difficult to find an individual to whose eloquence religion has in our times been so greatly indebted."

== Publications ==
- Sermons on various Moral and Religious Subjects, for some of the Principal Festivals of the Year,, London, 1789, 8vo; 2nd edit. 4 vols. London, 1794, 12mo; 3rd edit. 2 vols. London, 1817, 8vo
- Sermons on Matrimonial Duties, and other Moral and Religious Subjects, London, 1804, 12mo.
