= Atlanta campaign order of battle =

The order of battle for the Atlanta campaign includes:

- for the period of May 7 – July 17, 1864:
  - Atlanta campaign order of battle: First phase, Confederate
  - Atlanta campaign order of battle: First phase, Union
- for the period July 17 – September 8, 1864:
  - Atlanta campaign order of battle: Second phase, Confederate
  - Atlanta campaign order of battle: Second phase, Union

== See also ==
- Battle of Atlanta order of battle
