= Alexander Chambers =

American general (1832–1888)

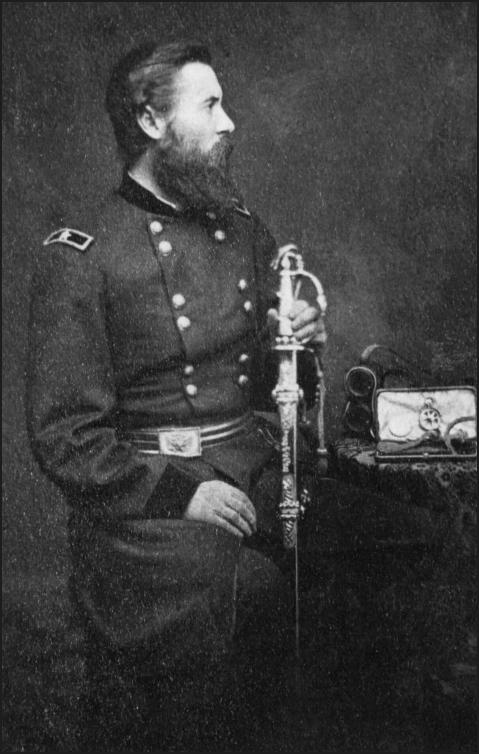
- Born: August 23, 1832; Cattaraugus, New York
- Died: February 2, 1888 (aged 55); San Antonio, Texas
- Burial place: Owatonna, Minnesota
- Education: West Point
- Military career
- Allegiance: United States
- Branch: Army
- Rank: General
- Commands: 16th Iowa Volunteer Infantry Regiment
- Conflicts: American Civil War
- Other work: Military judge-advocate

Alexander Chambers (August 23, 1832 – January 2, 1888) was a US Army officer, who became a general during the American Civil War.

== Biography ==
Chambers was born in Cattaraugus, New York. He graduated from West Point with the class of 1853 (which also included John Schofield and Philip Sheridan), and was commissioned a second lieutenant. He fought in the Third Seminole War from 1855, and was promoted to first lieutenant in 1859. In May 1861, shortly after the war started, he was promoted to captain, and performed recruiting duty in Iowa. Promoted to colonel in March 1862, he took command of the 16th Iowa Volunteer Infantry Regiment, leading it at the Battle of Shiloh and the Battle of Iuka, being wounded on both occasions. Returning to duty, he led a brigade in the Vicksburg Campaign. In August 1863, he was appointed brigadier general of volunteers and led a division in the XVII Corps, but his appointment was revoked by the U.S. Senate in April 1864. On December 8, 1868, President Andrew Johnson nominated Chambers for appointment to the brevet grade of brigadier general of volunteers, to rank from March 13, 1865, for the Battle of Champion's Hill, and the U.S. Senate confirmed the appointment on February 16, 1869.

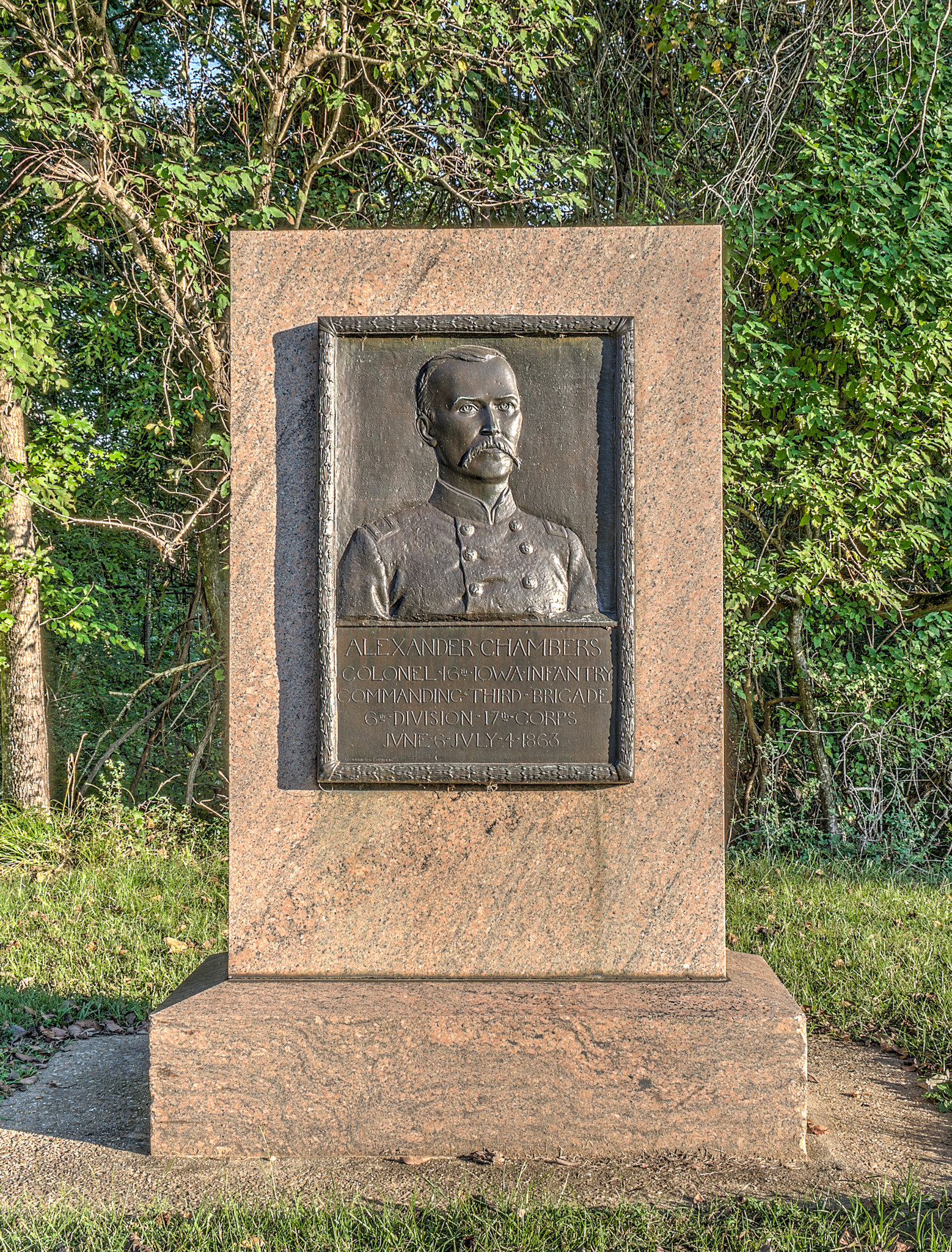
Relief portrait at Vicksburg National Military Park

After the war, he reverted to the rank of captain and remained in the army and served as a military judge-advocate in Nebraska, receiving promotions to major and lieutenant colonel. He was also military attache to the Ottoman Empire from July 1877 to September 1878. His last appointment was as garrison commander at Fort Townsend.

He died in San Antonio, Texas, with the rank of colonel in the 17th U.S. Infantry Regiment and was buried in Owatonna, Minnesota.
