= 21st Missouri Infantry Regiment =

Infantry regiment

- Active: February 1, 1862, to April 19, 1866
- Country: United States
- Allegiance: Union
- Branch: Infantry
- Engagements: Battle of Shiloh; Siege of Corinth; Battle of Iuka; Battle of Corinth; Grant's Mississippi Central Campaign; Action Against Guerrillas at Islands Nos 70 & 71; Red River Campaign; Battle of Fort DeRussy; Battle of Pleasant Hill; Retreat to Morganza; Battle of Mansura; Battle of Yellow Bayou; Smith's Expedition to Tupelo; Battle of Camargo's Cross Roads; Battle of Tupelo; Battle of Old Town Creek; Smith's Expedition to Oxford; Tallahatchie River; Battle of Abbeville; Pursuit of Price; Fight near Lone Jack; Battle of Nashville; Siege of Spanish Fort and Fort Blakeley; Assault on Fort Blakeley; Occupation of Mobile

The 21st Missouri Infantry Regiment was an infantry regiment that served in the Union Army during the American Civil War.

== History ==
The 21st Missouri Infantry Regiment was organized February 1, 1862, from 1st and 2nd Northeast Regiments of the Missouri Infantry. It was attached to the Department of Missouri in March, 1862 the 1st Brigade, 6th Division, Army of Tennessee, to July, 1862, 1st Brigade, 6th Division, District of Corinth, Miss., to November, 1862. 1st Brigade, 6th Division, Left Wing 13th Army Corps (Old), Department of Tennessee, to December, 1862. District of Columbus, Ky., 16th Army Corps, Department of the Tennessee, to May, 1863. 4th Brigade, District of Memphis, Tenn., 5th Division, 16th Army Corps, to January, 1864. 1st Brigade, 3rd Division, 16th Army Corps, to December, 1864. 1st Brigade, 2nd Division, Detachment Army of the Tennessee, Department of the Cumberland, to February, 1865. 1st Brigade, 2nd Division, 16th Army Corps (New), Military Division West Mississippi, to August, 1865. Department of Alabama to April, 1866.

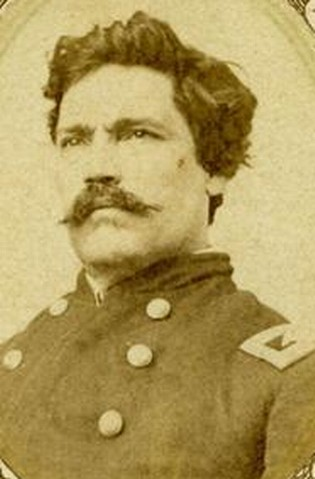
Col. David Moore, the 21st commander from inception until February, 1865.

== Detailed service ==
- Ordered to Pittsburg Landing, Tenn., March, 1862. Battle of Shiloh, Tenn., April 6–7.
- Advance on and siege of Corinth, Miss., April 29-May 30.
- Occupation of Corinth and pursuit to Booneville May 31-June 12. Duty at Corinth until September.
- Battle of Iuka September 19. Battle of Corinth October 3–4.
- Pursuit to Ripley October 5–12. Grant's Central Mississippi Campaign November, 1862, to January, 1863.
- On post and garrison duty at Columbus, Ky.; Union City, Tenn.; Clinton, Ky., and Memphis, Tenn., until January, 1864.
- Ordered to Vicksburg, Miss., January 26. Actions with guerrillas at Islands Nos. 70 and 71, Mississippi River, while en route, January 29, on steamer "William Wallace".
- Meridian Campaign February 3-March 2. Queen Hill February 4.
- Red River Campaign March 10-May 22.
- Fort DeRussy March 14.
- Occupation of Alexandria, La., March 16.
- Battle of Pleasant Hill April 9. About Cloutiersville April 22–24.
- At Alexandria April 26-May 13.
- Retreat to Morganza May 13–20. Mansura May 16.
- Yellow Bayou May 18.
- Moved to Vicksburg, Miss.. thence to Memphis, Tenn., May 22-June 10.
- Action at Old River Lake or Lake Chicot June 5–6.
- Smith's Expedition to Tupelo, Miss., July 5–21.
- Camargo's Cross Roads, near Harrisburg, July 13.
- Tupelo July 14–15.
- Old Town Creek July 15.
- Smith's Expedition to Oxford, Miss., August 1–30.
- Tallahatchie River August 7–9.
- Abbeville August 23.
- Moved to Duvall's Bluff, Ark., September 1–6.
- March through Arkansas and Missouri in pursuit of Price September 17-November 16.
- Lone Jack November 1.
- Moved to Nashville, Tenn., November 25 December 1.
- Battle of Nashville December 15–16.
- Pursuit of Hood to the Tennessee River December 17–28.
- Moved to Clifton, Tenn., thence to Eastport, Miss., January 2–7, 1865, and duty there until February 9.
- Moved to Vicksburg, Miss.
- Moved to New Orleans, La., February 9–21.
- Campaign against Mobile and its Defenses March 17-April 12.
- Siege of Spanish Fort and Fort Blakeley March 26-April 8.
- Assault and capture of Fort Blakeley April 9.
- Occupation of Mobile April 12.
- March to Montgomery April 13–25, and duty there until June.
- Moved to Mobile June 1.
- Duty at Mobile and other points in Alabama until April, 1866.
- Mustered out April 19, 1866.

== Casualties ==
The Regiment lost during service 2 Officers and 68 Enlisted men killed and mortally wounded and 5 Officers 234 Enlisted men by disease.

== Commanders ==
- Colonel David Moore: Commander led the unit from muster of unit until Feb 11, 1865.

== See also ==
- Missouri Civil War Union units
- Missouri in the Civil War
