= James W. Archer =

American soldier who received the Medal of Honor

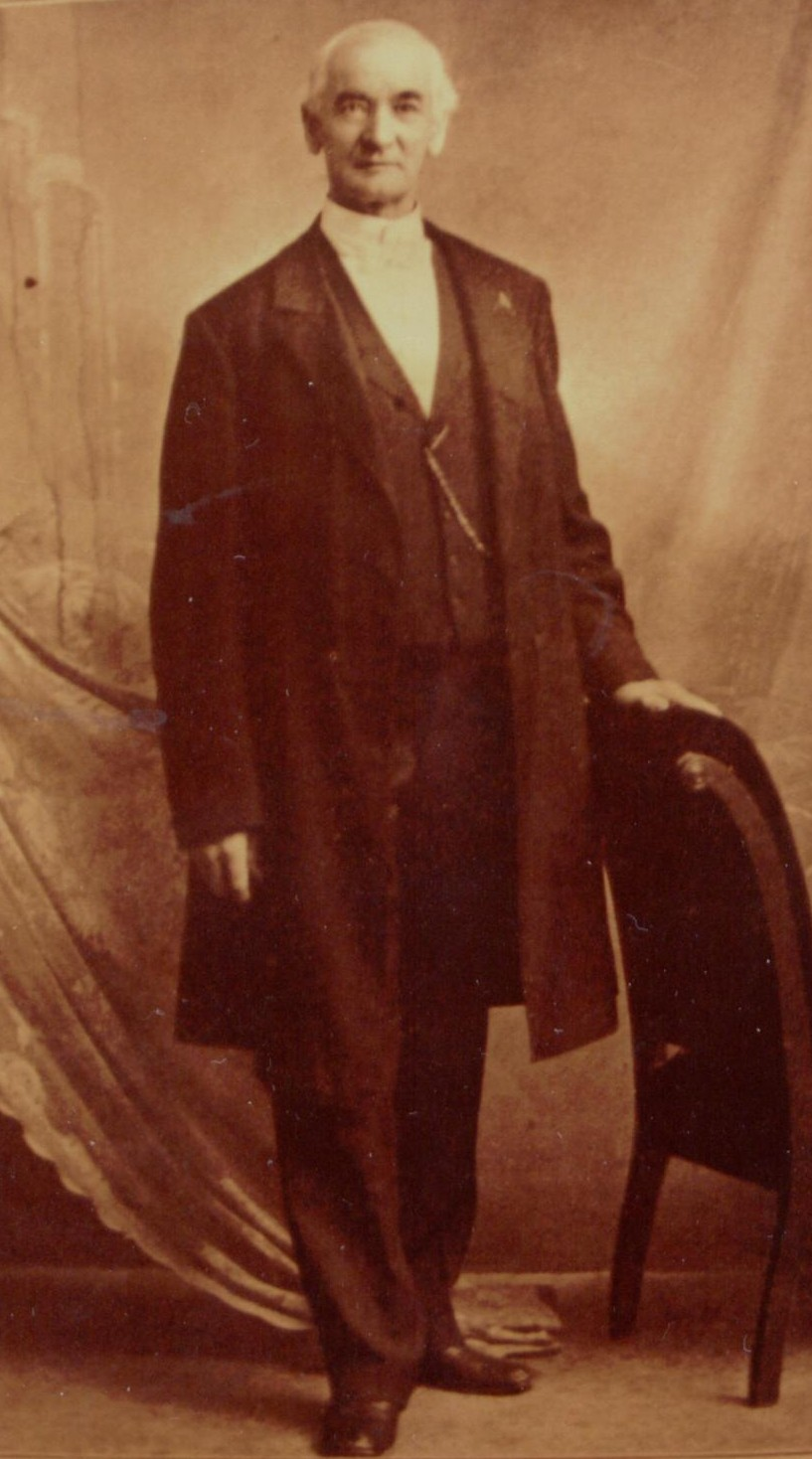
- Born: September 6, 1828; Edgar County, Illinois
- Died: January 28, 1908 (aged 79)
- Burial place: Spencer, Indiana
- Military career
- Allegiance: United States of America
- Branch: United States Army; Union Army
- Rank: First Lieutenant
- Unit: 59th Regiment Indiana Volunteer Infantry
- Conflicts: Second Battle of Corinth
- Awards: Medal of Honor

James W. Archer (September 6, 1828 – January 28, 1908) was an American soldier who received the Medal of Honor for valor during the American Civil War.

== Biography ==
Archer served in the American Civil War in the 59th Indiana Infantry for the Union Army. He received the Medal of Honor on August 2, 1897 for his actions at the Second Battle of Corinth.

== Medal of Honor citation ==
Citation:

Voluntarily took command of another regiment, with the consent of one or more of his seniors, who were present, rallied the command and led it in the assault.

== See also ==
- List of American Civil War Medal of Honor recipients: A-F
