= John Morrison Oliver =

American lawyer

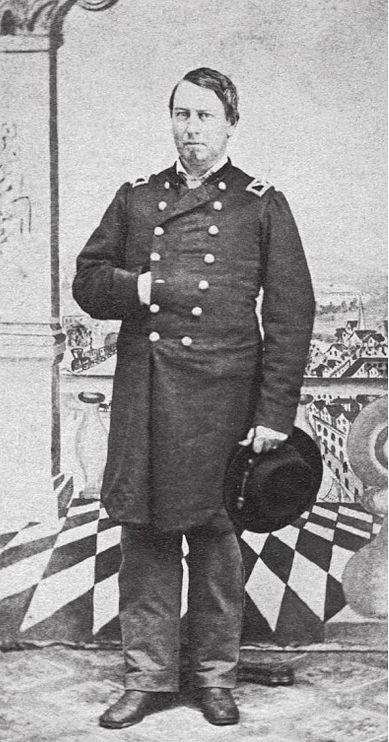
- John Morrison Oliver
- Born: September 6, 1828; Penn Yan, New York
- Died: March 30, 1872 (aged 43); Washington, D.C.
- Burial place: Lakeview Cemetery, Penn Yan
- Military career
- Allegiance: United States of America; Union
- Branch: United States Army; Union Army
- Service years: 1861-1865
- Rank: Brigadier General; Brevet Major General
- Commands: 15th Michigan Infantry Regiment
- Conflicts: American Civil War: Battle of Shiloh; Siege of Corinth; Second Battle of Corinth; Siege of Vicksburg; Atlanta campaign; Sherman's March to the Sea; Battle of Bentonville
- Other work: Pharmacist, lawyer, post office superintendent

John Morrison Oliver (September 6, 1828 – March 30, 1872) was a Union general during the American Civil War. He fought in many of the battles involving the Army of the Tennessee, occasionally commanding a brigade.

== Biography ==
He was born on September 6, 1828, in Penn Yan, New York.

Oliver graduated from St. John's College in New York. He moved to Michigan and worked as a pharmacist. When the Civil War began he joined the 4th Michigan Volunteer Infantry Regiment as a private. He rose to captain in that regiment before being appointed colonel of the 15th Michigan on March 13, 1862. He led his regiment at Shiloh and commanded the 2nd Brigade, 6th Division during the siege and battle of Corinth. He returned to command the 15th Michigan during the siege of Vicksburg where he was part of the XVI Corps. He briefly commanded the 2nd Brigade, 4th Division, XV Corps and was transferred to Chattanooga in the wake of Ulysses Grant's victory there in 1863. Oliver was back in command of his regiment during William T. Sherman's preparations for the advance against Atlanta, but once the campaign got underway Oliver was in command of the 3rd Brigade, 4th Division, XV Corps. He briefly led the 1st Brigade, 4th Division at the battle of Jonesborough. During the March to the Sea, Oliver commanded the 3rd Brigade, 2nd Division, XV Corps. His was one of the brigades that assaulted Fort McAllister in December. On January 12, 1865, he was promoted to brigadier general of volunteers. He was at the battle of Bentonville, though his brigade did not see much action. He received a brevet promotion to major general of volunteers on March 13, 1865, and was in command of the 2nd Division, XV Corps at the close of the war. He was mustered out of the volunteer service on August 24, 1865.

Following the Civil War he moved to Arkansas where he practiced law and became the post office superintendent in Little Rock.

He died on March 30, 1872, in Washington, D.C.

== See also ==
- List of American Civil War generals (Union)
