= 16th Iowa Infantry Regiment =

- Iowa state flag
- Active: December 10, 1861, to July 19, 1865
- Country: United States
- Allegiance: Union
- Branch: Infantry
- Engagements: Battle of Shiloh; Battle of Corinth; Battle of Port Gibson; Battle of Raymond; Battle of Champion's Hill; Battle of Big Black River; Siege of Vicksburg; Battle of Kennesaw Mountain; Battle of Atlanta; Battle of Jonesboro; March to the Sea

The 16th Iowa Infantry Regiment was an infantry regiment that served in the Union Army during the American Civil War.

== Service ==
The 16th Iowa Infantry was organized at Davenport, Iowa, and mustered in for three years of Federal service by companies between December 10, 1861, and March 12, 1862.

The regiment was mustered out on July 19, 1865.

== Iowa Brigade ==
After the Battle of Shiloh, the Thirteenth Iowa was assigned to the Third Brigade of the Sixth Division. The Brigade was composed of the Eleventh, Thirteenth, Fifteenth and Sixteenth regiments of Iowa Infantry, and was under command of Colonel Crocker. This organization remained intact until the close of the war. Except when upon detached duty, the operations of each of the regiments were identified very largely with those of the brigade, and, therefore, the history of each of these four Iowa regiments is almost inseparably interwoven with that of the brigade.

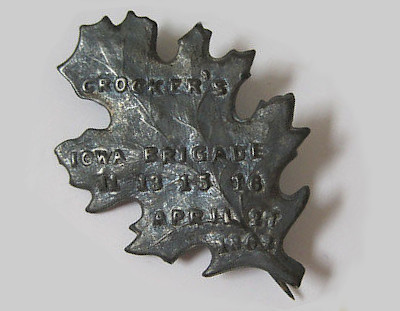

== Total strength and casualties ==
The 16th Iowa mustered a total of 1,441 men over the span of its existence. Seven officers and 94 enlisted men were killed in action or died of their wounds, while three officers and 219 enlisted men died of disease, for a total of 323 fatalities.

== Commanders ==
- Colonel Alexander Chambers

== See also ==
- List of Iowa Civil War Units
- Iowa in the American Civil War
