= 15th Michigan Infantry Regiment =

- State Flag of Michigan
- Active: October 16, 1861, to August 18, 1865
- Country: United States
- Allegiance: Union
- Branch: Infantry
- Engagements: Battle of Shiloh; Battle of Corinth; Siege of Vicksburg; Battle of Resaca; Battle of Kennesaw Mountain; Siege of Atlanta; Battle of Jonesborough; March to the Sea; Battle of Bentonville

The 15th Michigan Infantry Regiment was an infantry regiment that served in the Union Army during the American Civil War.

== Service ==
The 15th Michigan Infantry was organized at Ypsilanti and Detroit, Michigan, between October 16, 1861, and March 13, 1862, and was mustered into Federal service for a three-year enlistment on March 20, 1862 .

The regiment was mustered out of service on August 18, 1865.

== Total strength and casualties ==
The regiment suffered 335 fatalities over the course of the war. 3 officers and 60 enlisted men were killed in action or from wounds sustained in combat. The other 4 officers and 268 enlisted men died of disease.

== Commanders ==
- Colonel John Morrison Oliver
- Colonel Frederick Sharpe Hutchinson

== See also ==
- List of Michigan Civil War Units
- Michigan in the American Civil War
