= 15th Iowa Infantry Regiment =

- Iowa state flag
- Active: February 22, 1862, to July 24, 1865
- Country: United States
- Allegiance: Union
- Branch: Infantry
- Engagements: Battle of Shiloh; Battle of Corinth; Battle of Port Gibson; Battle of Raymond; Battle of Champion's Hill; Battle of Big Black River; Siege of Vicksburg; Battle of Kennesaw Mountain; Battle of Atlanta; Battle of Jonesboro; March to the Sea; Battle of Bentonville

The 15th Iowa Infantry Regiment was an infantry regiment that served in the Union Army during the American Civil War.

== Service ==
The 15th Iowa Infantry was organized at Keokuk, Iowa, and mustered in for three years of Federal service on February 22, 1862.

The regiment was mustered out on July 24, 1865.

== Iowa Brigade ==
After the Battle of Shiloh, the Thirteenth Iowa was assigned to the Third Brigade of the Sixth Division. The Brigade was composed of the Eleventh, Thirteenth, 15th Iowa Volunteer Infantry Regiment and Sixteenth regiments of Iowa Infantry, and was under command of Colonel Crocker. This organization remained intact until the close of the war. Except when upon detached duty, the operations of each of the regiments were identified very largely with those of the brigade, and, therefore, the history of each of these four Iowa regiments is almost inseparably interwoven with that of the brigade.

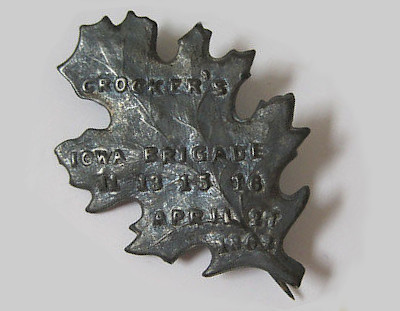

== Total strength and casualties ==
The 15th Iowa mustered a total of 1,926 men over the span of its existence. It suffered 8 officers and 118 enlisted men who were killed in action or who died of their wounds and 1 officer and 260 enlisted men who died of disease, for a total of 387 fatalities.

== Commanders ==
- Colonel Hugh T. Reid
- Colonel William W. Belknap

== See also ==
- List of Iowa Civil War Units
- Iowa in the American Civil War
