= 47th Illinois Infantry Regiment =

47th Regiment Illinois Volunteer Infantry
- Illinois state flag
- Active: August 16, 1861, to January 21, 1866
- Country: United States
- Allegiance: Union
- Branch: Infantry
- Engagements: Battle of Corinth; Siege of Vicksburg; Red River Campaign; Battle of Pleasant Hill

The 47th Regiment Illinois Volunteer Infantry was an infantry regiment that served in the Union Army during the American Civil War.

== Service ==
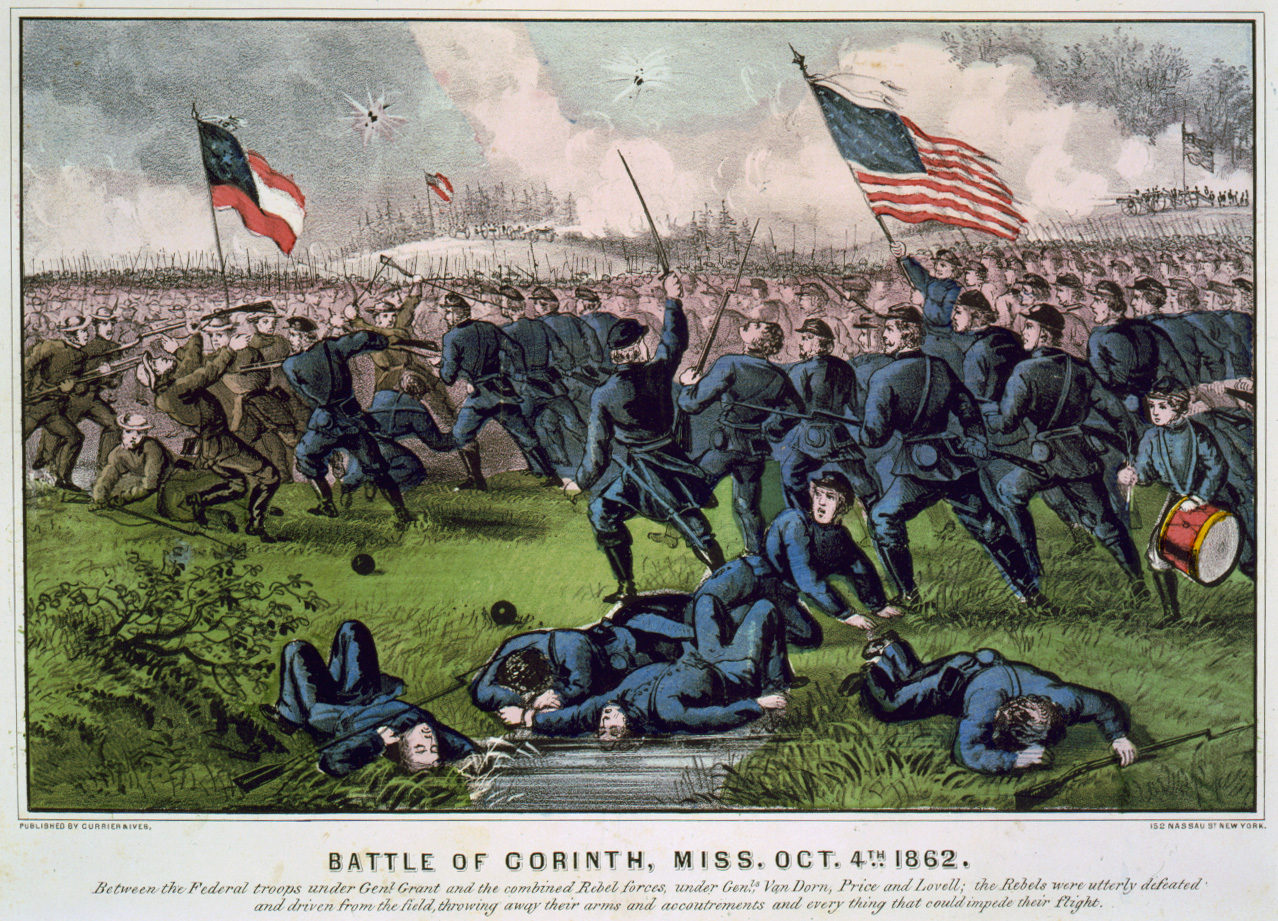
Fanciful rendition of the October 1862 Battle of Corinth, Mississippi, by lithographers Currier and Ives. The 47th Illinois Volunteers were part of the fighting, which resulted in combined losses of 828 killed and more than 3,800 wounded and missing.

The 47th Illinois Infantry was organized at Peoria, Illinois and mustered into Federal service on August 16, 1861. The unit was transferred to St. Louis, Missouri, on September 23, 1861, and remained on barracks duty until December of that year.

The 47th Illinois Volunteers lost 30 killed and 100 wounded in the Battle of Corinth, Mississippi, in October 1862. The unit also suffered heavy casualties in a May 22, 1863, charge during the initial phase of the Siege of Vicksburg, Mississippi.

Following a discharge at Springfield, Illinois, in October 1864 there was subsequent reorganization, with the reorganized unit seeing duty in Kentucky, Tennessee, and Mississippi. The regiment was finally mustered out of service on January 21, 1866.

== Total strength and casualties ==
The regiment suffered 5 officers and 58 enlisted men who were killed in action or mortally wounded and 3 officers and 184 enlisted men who died of disease, for a total of 250 fatalities.

== Commanders ==
- Colonel John Bryner - resigned on September 2, 1862.
- Colonel William A. Thrush - killed in action October 3, 1862.
- Colonel John N. Cromwell - killed in action May 16, 1863.
- Colonel John D. McClure - mustered out of service on October 11, 1864.

== See also ==
- List of Illinois Civil War Units
- Illinois in the American Civil War
