= 30th Illinois Infantry Regiment =

30th Regiment Illinois Volunteer Infantry
- Illinois state flag
- Active: August 28, 1861, to July 24, 1865
- Country: United States
- Allegiance: Union
- Branch: Infantry
- Engagements: Battle of Belmont; Battle of Champion Hill; Battle of Big Black River; Siege of Vicksburg; Battle of Kennesaw Mountain; Battle of Atlanta; Battle of Jonesboro; March to the Sea; Battle of Bentonville

The 30th Regiment Illinois Volunteer Infantry was an infantry regiment that served in the Union Army during the American Civil War.

== Service ==
The 30th Illinois Infantry was organized at Camp Butler, Illinois and mustered into Federal service on August 28, 1861, Colonel P.B. Fouke commanding.

1 Sep 1861 - The company relocated to Cairo under Brigadier General John A McCernand's Brigade. Brigadier General and future president U S Grant was commander of the District of Cairo and Major General John C Fremont was the commander of the Department of Missouri

22 Oct 1861 - scouts deployed into Kentucky.

7 Nov 1861 - The Battle of Belmont capturing Watson's New Orleans Battery.

10-22 Jan 1862 - another recognizance foray into Kentucky

4 Feb 1862 - Fort Henry attacked

13 Feb 1862 - 15 Feb 1862 The siege and capture of Fort Donelson

25 April 1862 - Arrived at Pittsburg Landing and assisted in the siege of corinth under Colonel Logan.

4/5 Jun 1862 - traveled to Bethel

8 Jun 1862 - occupied Jackson, Tennessee, traveling on to Estenula on the 13 or 14 Aug 1862 and reached Denmark, Tennessee, on the 31 June.

1 Sep 1862 - headed toward Medan Station on the Mississippi Central Railroad and about 4 miles out meet the 6,000 member Confederate army operating under General Armstrong. The 30th, commanded by Colonel Dennis, and the 20th and the 4th Cavalry won out after 4 hours of fighting.

2 Sep 1862 - traveled to Medan and on to Jackson on 3 September. By the 2 November they were in Lagrange. Marching toward Water Valley Mississippi they arrived 19 December 1862. Reaching Memphis on 19 January 1863.

22 Feb 1863 arrived at Lake Providence, Louisiana. Then moving to Milliken's Bend, Louisiana, by 17 April 1863, joining Grant's army on the march to Bruinsburg, Mississippi, where they crossed the river on to Thompson's Hill on 1 March. They had several skirmishes along the Black river as they moved toward Hankinson's Ferry.

12 May 1863 - Battle of Raymond.

16 May 1863 - Battle of Champion Hills where they lost heavily. Arriving at Vicksburg on 19 May 1863.

25 May 1863 - now under General Blair moved on to Mechanicsburg returning to participate in the siege of Vicksburg until 23 Jun 1863 when they moved to the Black river under General Sherman, to watch confederate General Johnson. They continued with General Sherman to Jackson and then back to Vicksburg on 25 Jul 1863.

20 Aug 1863 - moved to Monroe, Louisiana, returning to Vicksburg on 28 Aug 1863.

14 Oct 1863 - under General McPherson moved toward Canton, Mississippi, engaging in the battle at Bogachitta Creek.

1 Jan 1864 - mustered in as a veteran organization and engaged is several skirmishes in January and February traveling about 300 miles on their march up the Mississippi River and back.

5 Mar 1864 - furloughed to the State and arrived at Camp Butler on 12 March 1864.

18 Apr 1864 - left Camp Butler arriving in Cairo joining with the Tennessee River Expedition under General W.Q. Gresham. On 30 Apr arrived in Clifton, TN and leaving on 5 May marched on to Pulaski, Tennessee; to Athens, Alabama; and to Huntsville, Louisiana. On 25 May began their travel to Decatur crossing the Tennessee River on the 27th. They continued on to Warrenton, Alabama; to Rome, Georgia; and on to Kingston, Georgia, joining General Sherman's Grand Army at Acksowrth on 8 Jun 1864. On 10 Jun they moved to Big Shanty and skirmishes with the enemy on 27 Jun losing about 20 that were killed and wounded.

4 Oct 1864 - moved north pursuing General Hood, via Kenesaw Mountain, to Resaca; returning to Smyrna Camp Ground, via Galesville, Alabama, by 5 Nov 1864.

The regiment was mustered out on July 16, 1865, and discharged at Chicago, Illinois, on July 24, 1865.

== Total strength and casualties ==
The regiment suffered 10 officers and 115 enlisted men who were killed in action or who died of their wounds and 2 officers and 218 enlisted men who died of disease, for a total of 345 fatalities.

== Commanders ==
- Colonel Philip B. Fouke
- Colonel Elias S. Dennis
- Colonel Warren Shedd - Mustered out with the regiment.

== See also ==
- List of Illinois Civil War Units
- Illinois in the American Civil War
