= 50th Illinois Infantry Regiment =

50th Regiment Illinois Volunteer Infantry
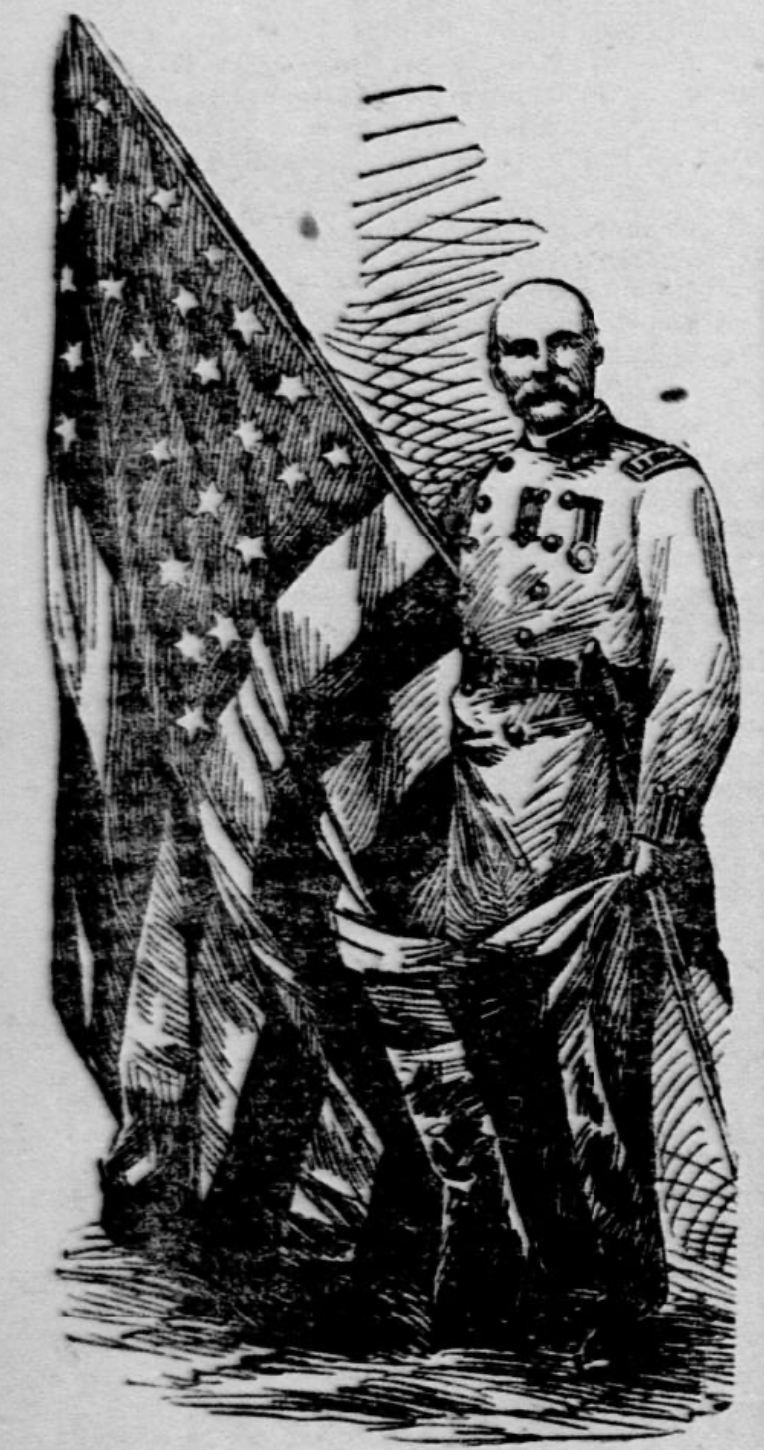
- McGillicuddy holding the National flag of the regiment
- Active: September 12, 1861, to July 13, 1865
- Country: United States
- Allegiance: Union
- Branch: Infantry
- Engagements: Battle of Fort Henry; Battle of Fort Donelson; Battle of Shiloh; Battle of Resaca; Battle of Allatoona; March to the Sea; Battle of Bentonville

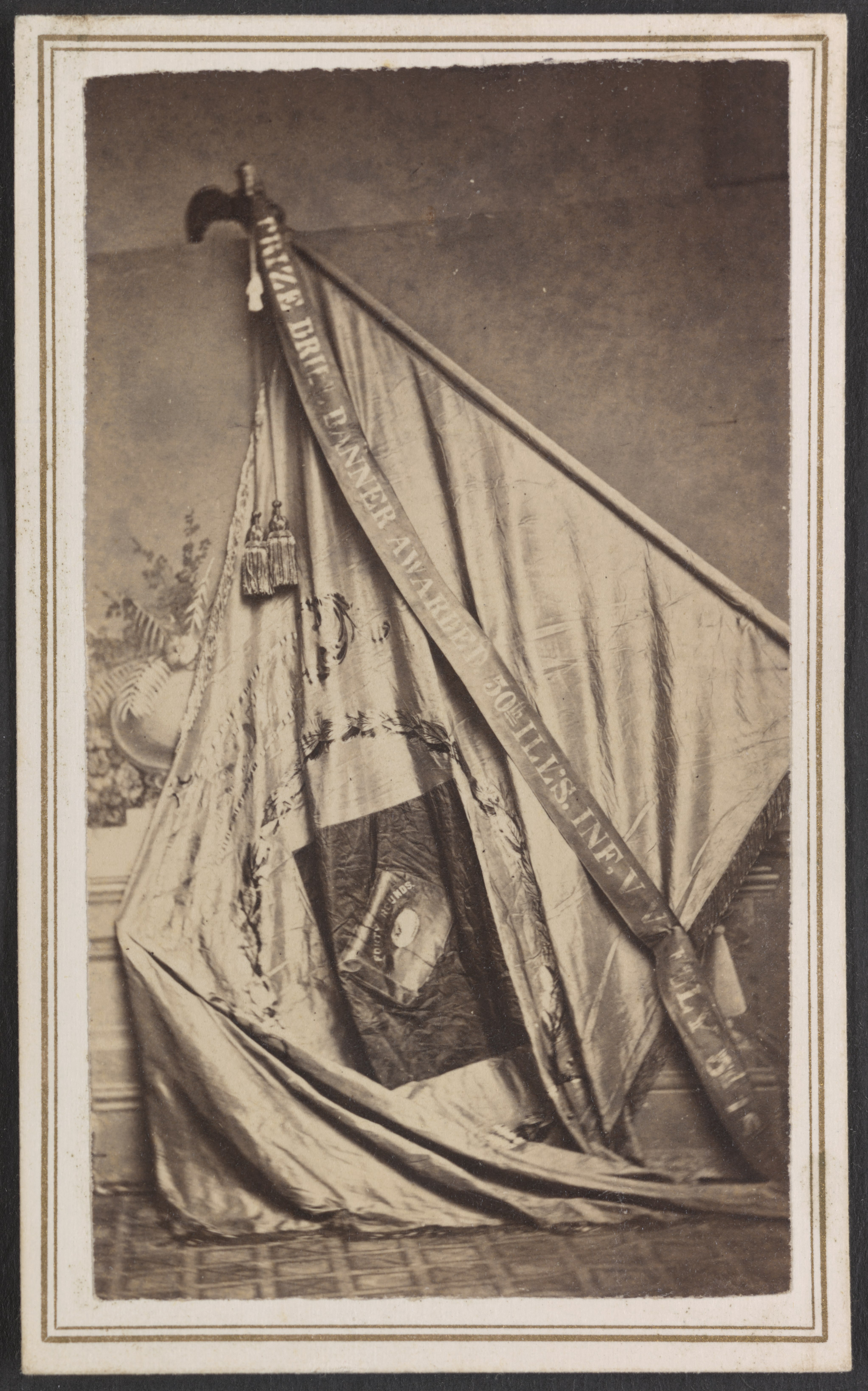
Excelsior Banner awarded to the 50th Illinois Infantry Regiment as first prize in a drill competition. From the Liljenquist Family Collection of Civil War Photographs, Prints and Photographs Division, Library of Congress

The 50th Regiment Illinois Volunteer Infantry, nicknamed the "Blind Half-Hundred," was an infantry regiment that served in the Union Army and fight with the Army of the Tennessee during the American Civil War. They engaged in such battles as Fort Donelson, Shiloh, Corinth, Vicksburg, the Atlanta Campaign, Allatoona, and the Marches to the Sea and north through the Carolinas.

== Service ==
The "Blind Half Hundred" organized in Quincy, Illinois, and mustered on September 12, 1861. Companies A-K were from Adams, Brown, Hancock, Warren, and Fulton Counties. Moved to Hannibal, Mo., October 9, thence to Chillicothe October 19. To St. Joseph, Mo., November 27; to Palmyra, Mo., December 19, and to St. Joseph, December 24. Attached to Department of Missouri October, 1861, to February, 1862. 3rd Brigade, 2nd Division, District of Cairo, February, 1862. 3rd Brigade, 2nd Division, District of West Tennessee, and Army of the Tennessee to July, 1862. 3rd Brigade, 2nd Division, District of Corinth, Miss., to November, 1862. 3rd Brigade, 2nd Division, District of Corinth, Miss., 13th Army Corps (Old), Department of the Tennessee, to December, 1862. 3rd Brigade, District of Corinth, 17th Army Corps, to January, 1863. 3rd Brigade, District of Corinth, 16th Army Corps, to March, 1863. 3rd Brigade, 2nd Division, 16th Army Corps, to September, 1864. 3rd Brigade, 4th Division, 15th Army Corps, to July, 1865.

SERVICE.--Moved from St. Joseph, Mo., to Cairo, Ill., and Smithland, Ky., January 21–28, 1862. Operations against Fort Henry, Tenn., February 2–6. Capture of Fort Henry February 6. Investment and capture of Fort Donelson, Tenn., February 12–16. Expedition to Clarksville and Nashville, Tenn., February 19-March 1. Moved to Pittsburg Landing, Tenn., March 25–31. Battle of Shiloh, Tenn., April 6–7. Advance on and siege of Corinth, Miss., April 29-May 30. Duty at Corinth until November, 1863. Reconnaissance to Bay Springs August 4–7, 1862 (two Companies). Battle of Corinth October 3–4, 1862. Pursuit to Hatchie River October 5–12. Grant's Central Mississippi Campaign November, 1862, to January, 1863. Expedition against Forest in West Tennessee December 18, 1862 – January 3, 1863. Dodge's Expedition to Northern Alabama April 15-May 3, 1863. Great Bear Creek and Cherokee Station April 17. Rock Cut, near Tuscumbia, April 22. Tuscumbia April 23. Town Creek April 28. Moved to LaGrange, Tenn., and return to Corinth October 11–17. Moved to Eastport, Pulaski and Lynnville November 6–12, and duty there until March, 1864. Regiment mounted November 17, and Veteranize January 1, 1864. Veterans on furlough until March 5. Atlanta (Ga.) Campaign May 1-September 8. Demonstration on Resaca May 8–13. Sugar Valley, near Resaca, May 9. Near Resaca May 13. Battle of Resaca May 14–15. Lay's Ferry, Oostenaula River, May 14–15. Rome Cross Roads May 16. Assigned to garrison duty at Rome, Ga., until November. Battle of Allatoona October 5. Cave Springs Road October 12–13. March to the sea November 15-December 10. Ogeechee Canal December 9. Siege of Savannah December 10–21. Campaign of the Carolinas January to April, 1865. Salkehatchie Swamps, S.C., February 2–5. South Edisto River February 9. North Edisto River February 11–12. Columbia February 15–17. Battle of Bentonville, N. C., March 20–21. Occupation of Goldsboro March 24. Advance on Raleigh April 10–14. Occupation of Raleigh April 14. Bennett's House April 26. Surrender of Johnston and his Army. March to Washington, D.C., via Richmond, Va., April 29-May 19. Grand Review May 24. Moved to Louisville, Ky., June 3–8. Mustered out July 13, 1865.

== Total strength and casualties ==
The regiment suffered 2 officers and 60 enlisted men who were killed in action or mortally wounded and 129 enlisted men who died of disease, for a total of 191 fatalities.

== Commanders ==
- Colonel Moses M. Bane - resigned on December 13, 1862.
- Lieutenant Colonel William Hanna - mustered out with the regiment.

== See also ==
- List of Illinois Civil War Units
- Illinois in the American Civil War
