= 11th Iowa Infantry Regiment =

- Active: September 28, 1861 – July 15, 1865
- Disbanded: July 15, 1865
- Country: United States
- Allegiance: Union
- Branch: Infantry
- Size: Regiment
- Engagements: American Civil War: Battle of Shiloh; Second Battle of Corinth; Battle of Port Gibson; Battle of Raymond; Battle of Champion's Hill; Battle of Big Black River; Siege of Vicksburg; Battle of Atlanta; March to the Sea

Commanders
- Colonel: Abraham M. Hare
- Colonel: Colonel William Hall
- Colonel: John C. Abercrombie

The 11th Iowa Infantry Regiment was an infantry regiment that served in the Union Army during the American Civil War.

== Service ==
The 11th Iowa Infantry was organized at Davenport, Iowa and mustered into Federal service between September 28 and October 18, 1861. The regiment was mustered out on July 15, 1865.

== Total strength and casualties ==
Total enrollment was 1297. The regiment lost 5 officers and 86 enlisted men who were killed in action or who died of their wounds and 2 officers and 166 enlisted men who died of disease, for a total of 259 fatalities. 234 were wounded.

== Iowa Brigade ==
After the Battle of Shiloh, the Thirteenth Iowa was assigned to the Third Brigade of the Sixth Division. The Brigade was composed of the Eleventh, Thirteenth, Fifteenth and Sixteenth regiments of Iowa Infantry, and was under command of Colonel Crocker. This organization remained intact until the close of the war. Except when upon detached duty, the operations of each of the regiments were identified very largely with those of the brigade, and, therefore, the history of each of these four Iowa regiments is almost inseparably interwoven with that of the brigade.

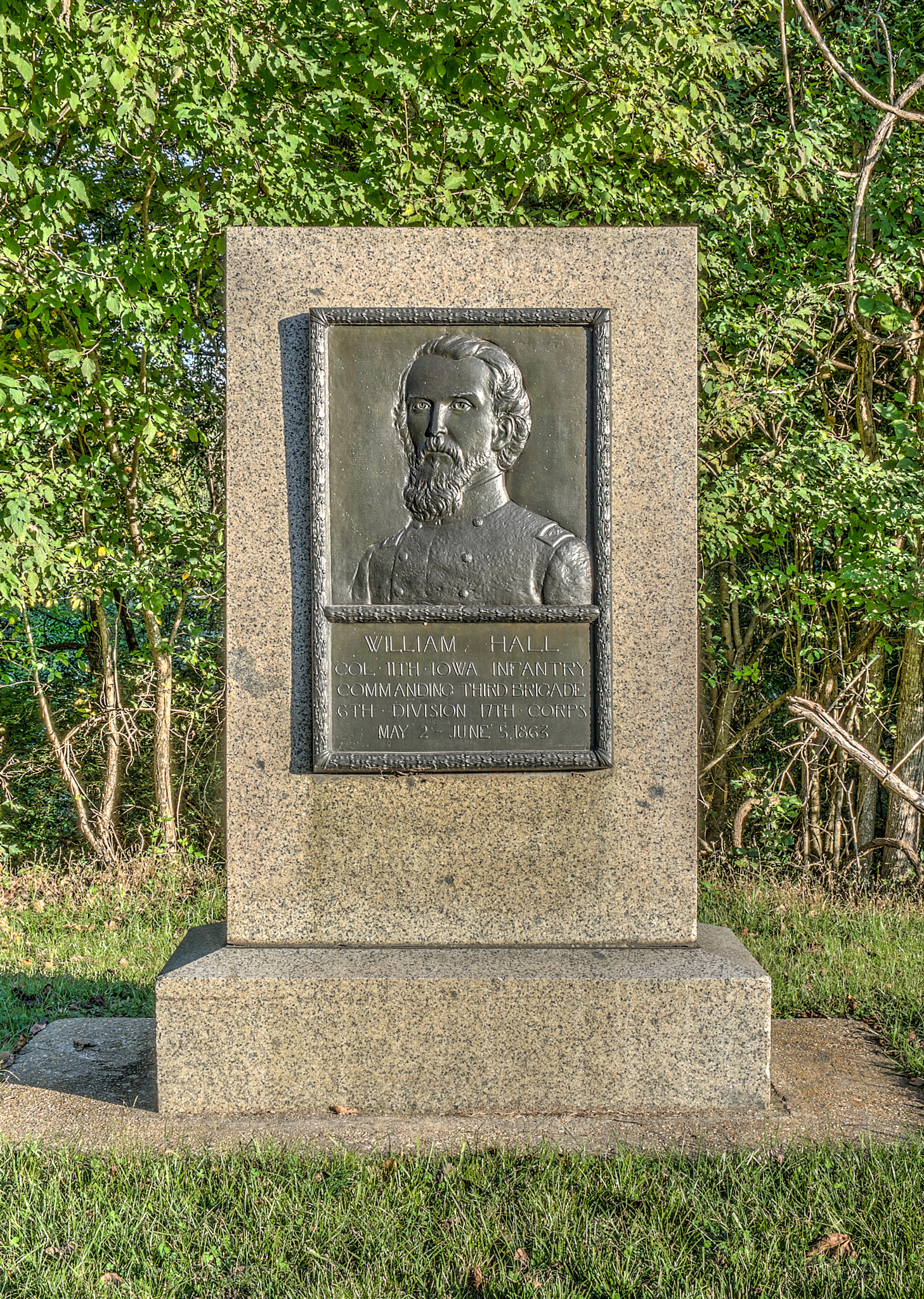
Relief portrait of Col. William Hall at Vicksburg National Military Park

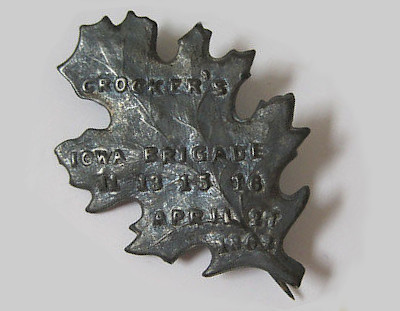
