= 3rd Ohio Independent Light Artillery Battery =

3rd Ohio Battery
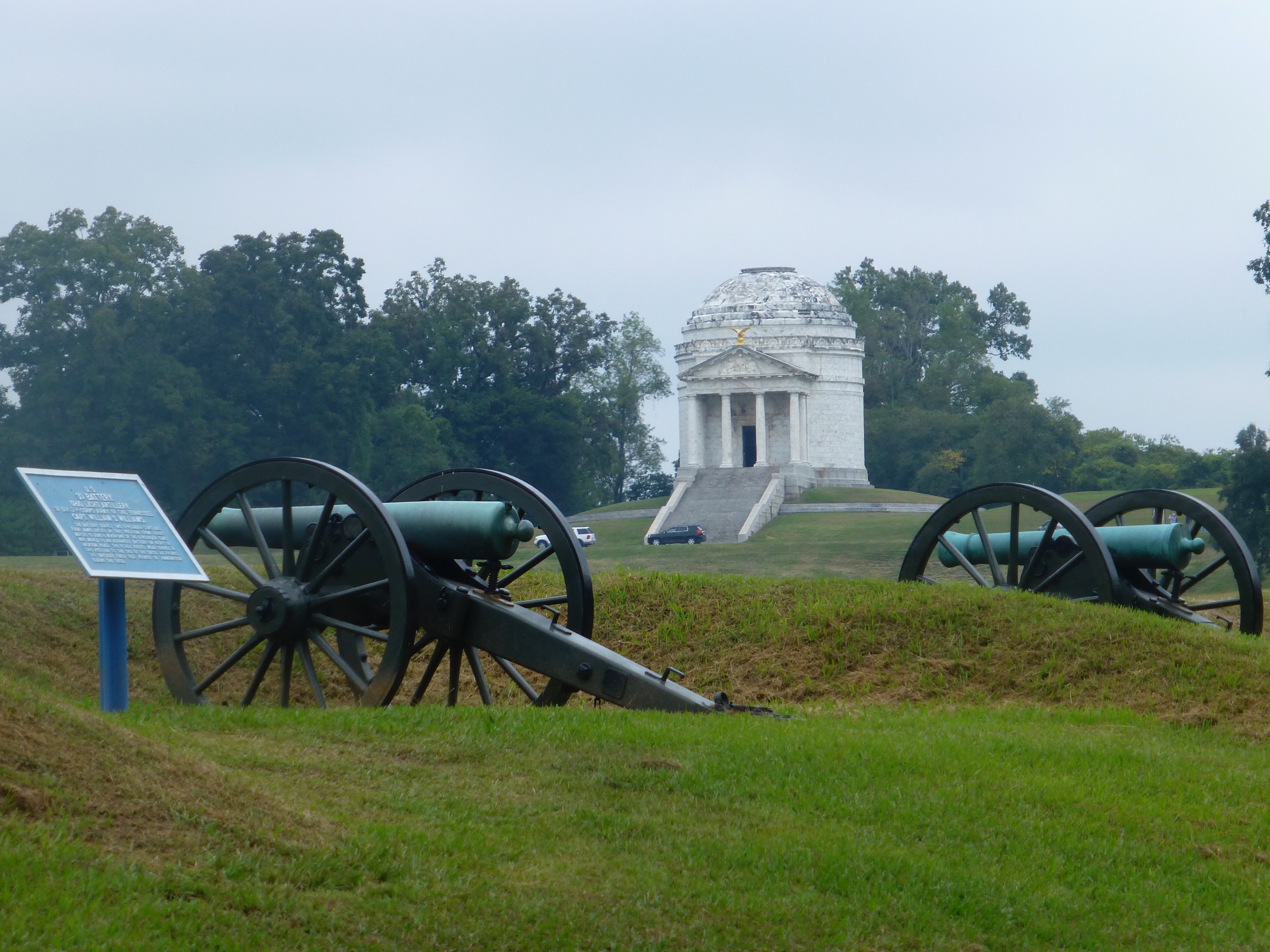
- Position of the 3rd Ohio Battery at Vicksburg National Military Park with the Illinois Monument in the background
- Active: November 9, 1861, to August 1, 1865
- Country: United States
- Allegiance: Union
- Branch: Artillery
- Engagements: Battle of Shiloh; Siege of Corinth; Battle of Port Gibson; Battle of Raymond; Battle of Champion Hill; Siege of Vicksburg, May 19 & May 22 assaults Atlanta campaign Battle of Kennesaw Mountain; Battle of Atlanta; Siege of Atlanta; Battle of Jonesboro

3rd Ohio Battery was an artillery battery that served in the Union Army during the American Civil War.

== Service ==
The 3rd Ohio Battery was organized in Canton, Minerva, and Massillon, Ohio November 9, 1861, through March 15, 1862, and mustered in for three years service under Captain William S. Williams.

The battery was attached to 6th Division, Army of the Tennessee, to July 1862. Artillery, 6th Division, District of Corinth, Mississippi, to November 1862. 3rd Division, Left Wing, XIII Corps, Department of the Tennessee, to December 1862. Artillery, 3rd Division, XVII Corps, Army of the Tennessee, to November 1864. Artillery Reserve, Nashville, Tennessee, Department of the Cumberland, to March 1865. Garrison Fort Donelson, Tennessee, 5th Sub-District, District of Middle Tennessee, to July 1865.

The 3rd Ohio Battery mustered out of service August 1, 1865, at Columbus, Ohio.

== Detailed service ==
- Ordered to Pittsburg Landing. Tennessee, March 15, 1862.
- Battle of Shiloh, April 6–7, 1862.
- Advance on and siege of Corinth, Mississippi., April 29 - May 30.
- Duty at Corinth until November.
- Battle of Corinth October 3–4.
- Grant's Central Mississippi Campaign November 1862 to January 1863.
- Reconnaissance to LaGrange November 8–9.
- Moved to Memphis, Tennessee, January 1863, and duty there until February 21.
- Moved to Lake Providence, Louisiana, February 21, thence to Milliken's Bend, Louisiana.
- Movement on Bruinsburg, Mississippi and turning Grand Gulf April 25–30.
- Battle of Port Gibson May 1 (reserve). Forty Hills, Hankinson's Ferry, May 3–4.
- Battle of Raymond May 12. Jackson May 14. Champion Hill May 16.

Siege of Vicksburg May 18-July 4. Assaults on Vicksburg May 19 and 22. Surrender of Vicksburg July 4. Duty at Vicksburg until February 1864. Expedition to Canton and Brownsville October 14–20, 1863. Bogue Chitto Creek October 17. Meridian Campaign February 3-March 2, 1864. Clinton, Mississippi, March 26.

- At Vicksburg until April 4.
- March to Huntsville, Alabama, thence to Ackworth, Georgia, April 4 - June 8.
- Atlanta Campaign June 8-September 8.
- Operations about Marietta and against Kennesaw Mountain June 10-July 2.
- Bushy Mountain June 15–17. Assault on Kennesaw June 27.
- Nickajack Creek July 2–5. Chattahoochie River July 5–17. Howell's Ferry July 5.
- Leggett's or Bald Hill July 20–21.
- Battle of Atlanta July 22.
- Siege of Atlanta July 22-August 25.
- Flank movement on Jonesboro August 25–30.
- Battle of Jonesboro August 31 - September 1.
- Lovejoy's Station September 2–6.
- Operations in northern Georgia and northern Alabama against Hood September 29 - November 3.
- Ordered to Nashville, Tennessee, and duty there and at Fort Donelson, Tennessee, and vicinity as mounted infantry until June 1865.
- Ordered to Camp Taylor, Ohio, for muster out.

== Casualties ==
The battery lost a total of 58 men during service; 1 enlisted man killed, 57 enlisted men died of disease.

== Commanders ==
- Captain William S. Williams
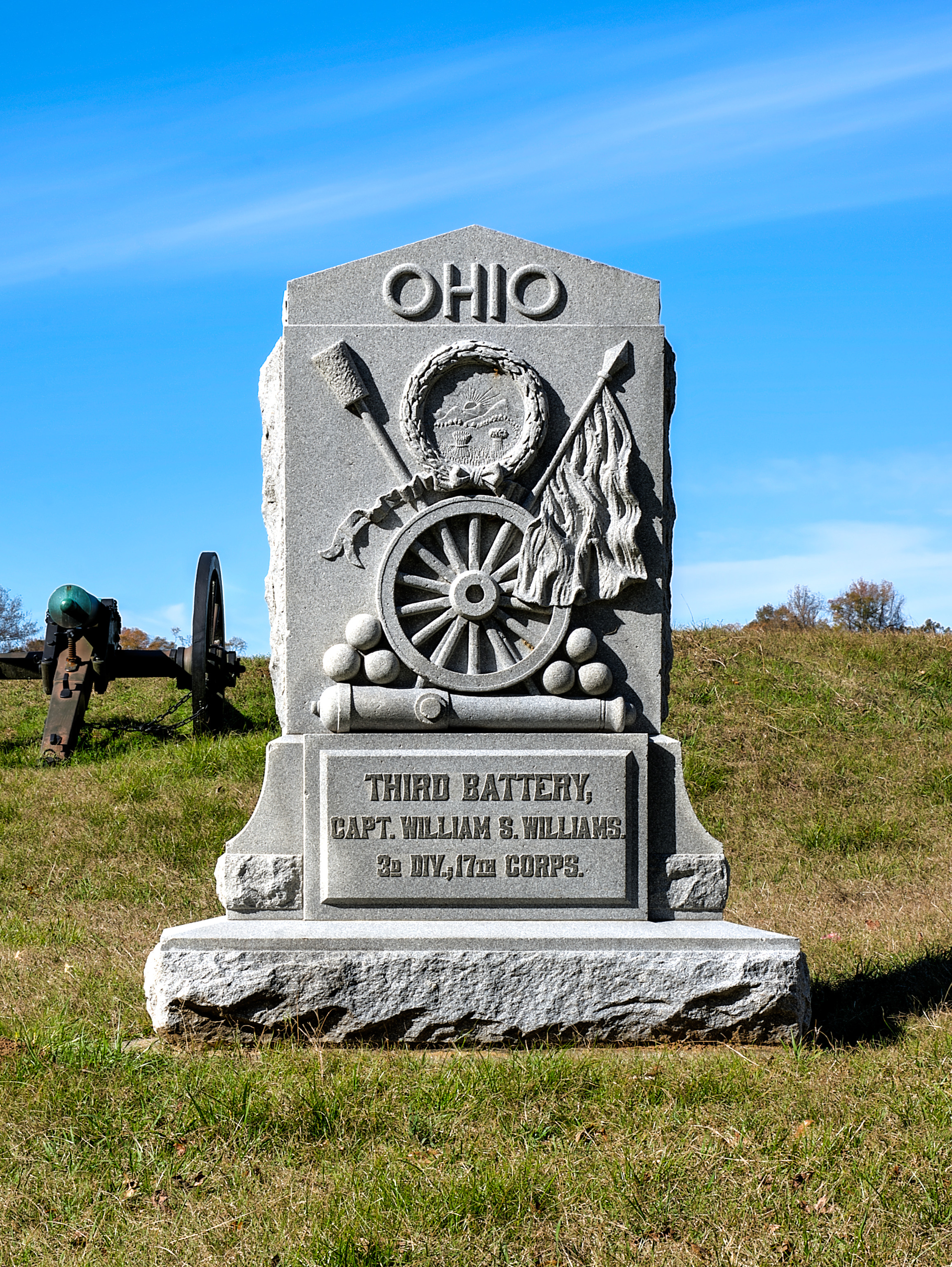
Memorial at Vicksburg NMP

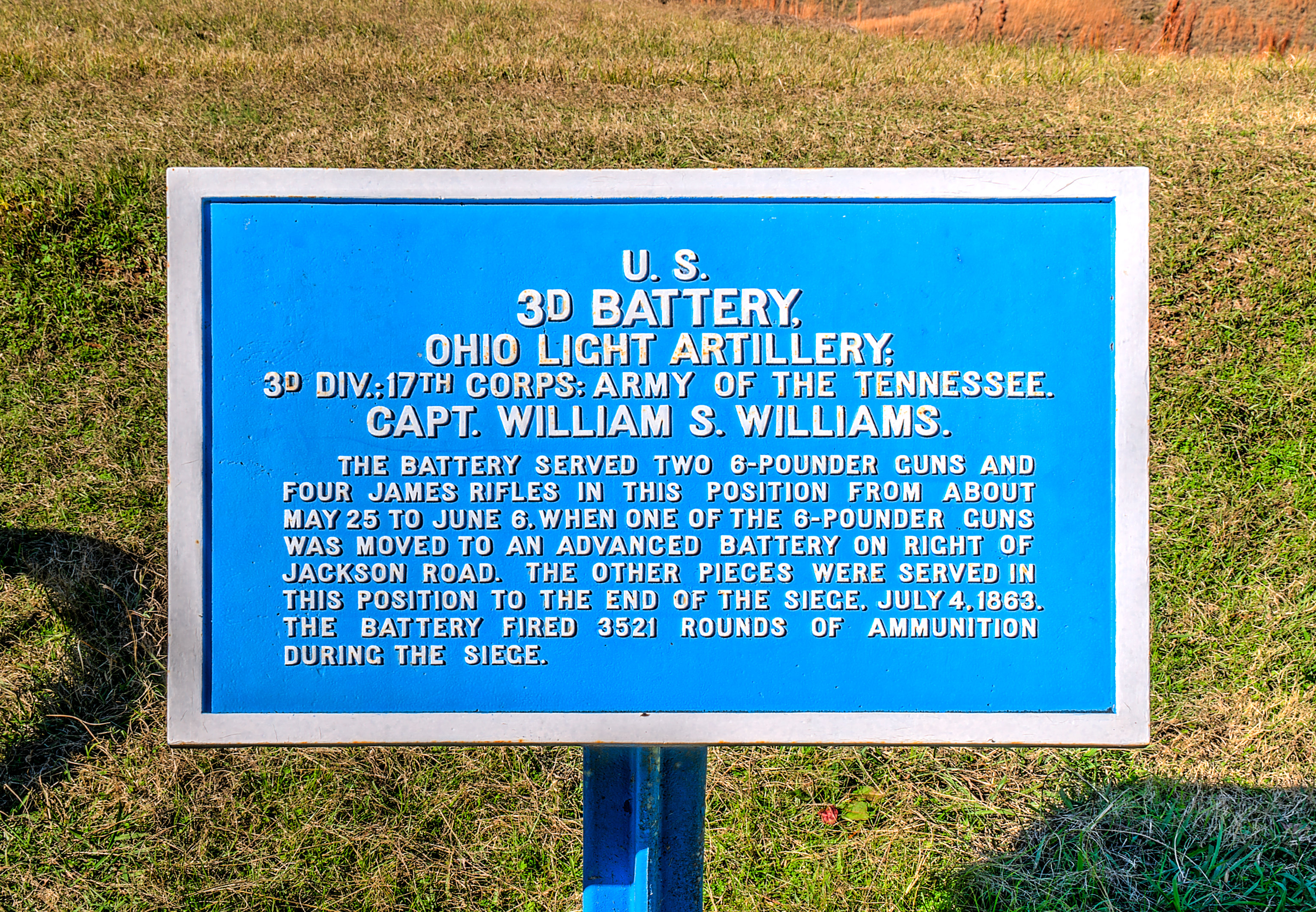
Iron tablet at Vicksburg NMP

== See also ==
- List of Ohio Civil War units
- Ohio in the Civil War
