= Battery H, 1st Missouri Light Artillery Regiment =

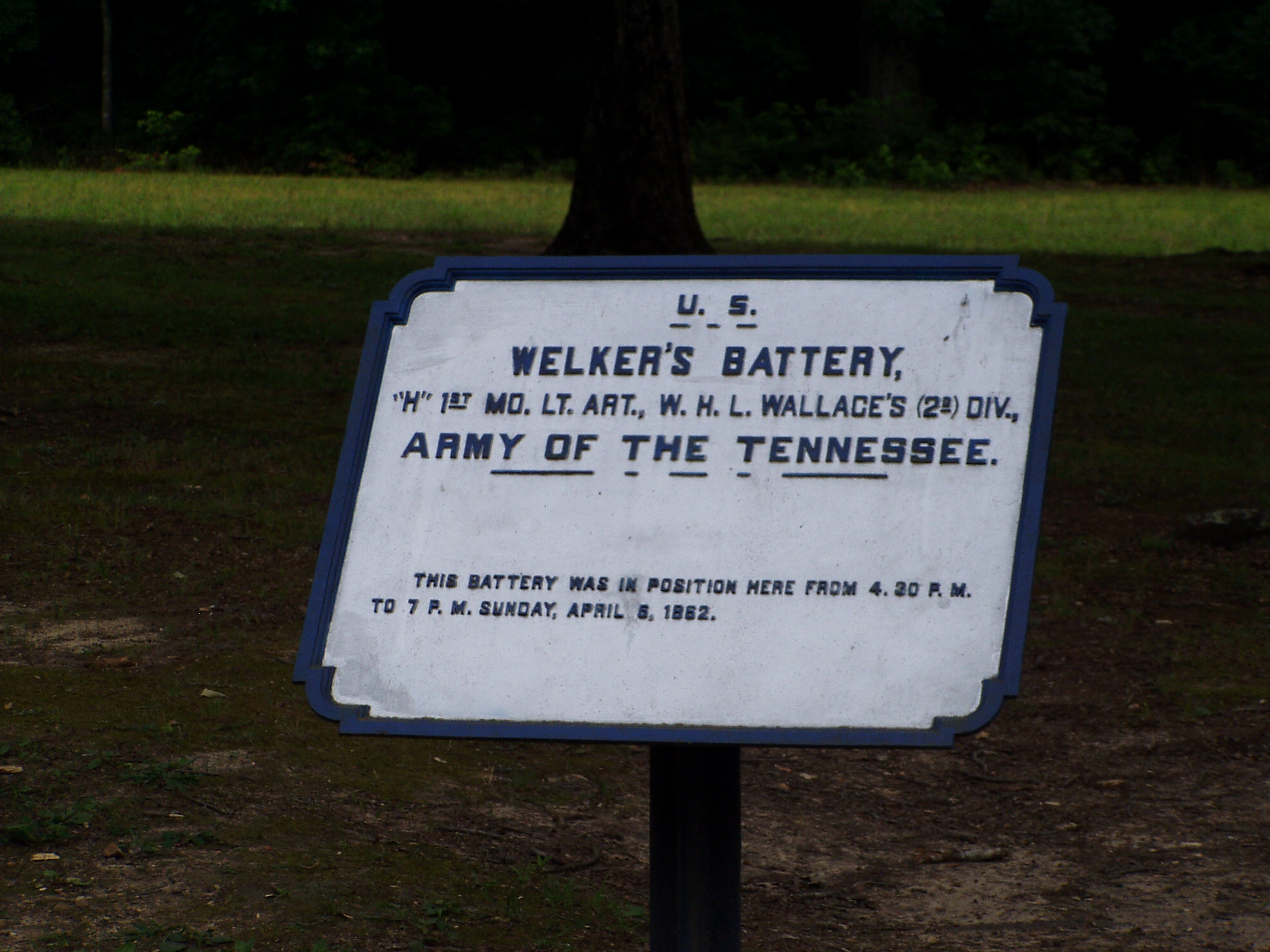
- Marker shows the position of Welker's Battery on Grant's final line at Shiloh National Military Park.
- Active: 1 Sept. 1861 – 16 June 1865
- Country: United States
- Allegiance: (United States) Union; Missouri
- Branch: Union Army
- Type: Artillery
- Size: Artillery Battery
- Equipment: 2 × M1841 6-pounder field guns and 1 × 24-pounder howitzer and 2 × 10-pounder Parrott rifles (Apr 1862); 6 × 12-pounder Napoleons (1863)
- Engagements: American Civil War; Battle of Fort Henry (1862); Battle of Fort Donelson (1862); Battle of Shiloh (1862); Siege of Corinth (1862); Battle of Corinth (1862); Battle of Resaca (1864); Battle of Kennesaw Mountain (1864); Battle of Atlanta (1864); Battle of Jonesboro (1864); Sherman's March to the Sea (1864); Campaign of the Carolinas (1865); Battle of Bentonville (1865)

Commanders
- Notable commanders: Frederick Welker; Charles M. Callahan

Battery H, 1st Missouri Light Artillery Regiment was an artillery battery unit from Missouri that served in the Union Army during the American Civil War. The 1st Missouri Light Artillery Regiment was created on 1 September 1861. Battery H fought at Fort Henry, Fort Donelson, Shiloh, 1st Corinth, and 2nd Corinth in 1862. The battery performed mostly garrison duty in 1863. The unit was in action in the Atlanta campaign and Sherman's March to the Sea in 1864 and in the Carolinas campaign in 1865. Battery H marched in the Grand Review of the Armies before being mustered out on 16 June 1865.

== Organization ==
Attached to Dept, Missouri, to February, 1862. 3rd Brigade, 2nd Division, Dist. Cairo, to March, 1862. 3rd Brigade, 2nd Division, District of West Tennessee, and Army of the Tennessee, to April, 1862. Artillery, 2nd Division, Army Tennessee, to July, 1862. Artillery, 2nd Division, District of Corinth Miss., to November, 1862. Artillery, District of Corinth, 13th Army Corps (Old), Dept. Tennessee, to December, 1862. Artillery, District of Corinth, 17th Army Corps, to January, 1863. Artillery, District of Corinth, 16th Army Corps, to March, 1863. Artillery, 2nd Division, 16th Army Corps, to September, 1864. Artillery Brigade, 15th Army Corps, to June, 1865.

== History ==
SERVICE.--Duty in Dept. of Missouri until February, 1862. Reconnaissance toward Fort Henry, Tenn., January 31-February 2. Capture of Fort Henry February 6. Investment and capture of Fort Donelson, Tenn., February 12–16. Expedition to Clarksville and Nashville, Tenn., February 22-March 6. Move to Pittsburg Landing, Tenn. Battle of Shiloh, Tenn., April 6–7. Advance on and siege of Corinth, Miss., April 29-May 30. Occupation of Corinth May 30, and pursuit to Booneville May 31-June 6. Duty at Corinth until October. Battle of Corinth October 3–4. Pursuit to Hatchie River October 5–12. Duty at Corinth until April, 1863. Dodge's Expedition to Northern Alabama April 15-May 8. Rock Cut, near Tuscumbia, April 22. Tuscumbia April 23. Town Creek April 28. Expedition to Tupelo, Miss., May 2–8. King's Creek, near Tupelo, May 5. At Corinth, Moscow and Lagrange until October. March to Pulaski, Tenn., October 30-November 11, and duty there until March, 1864. At Prospect, Tenn., until April. Atlanta (Ga.) Campaign May l-September 8. Sugar Valley May 9. Battle of Resaca May 13–14. Ley's Ferry, Oostenaula River May 15. Rome Cross Roads May 16. Battles about Dallas May 25-June 5. Operations about Marietta and against Kenesaw Mountain June 10-July 2. Assault on Kenesaw June 27. Ruff's Mill July 3–4. Chattahoochie River July 5–7. Battle of Atlanta July 22. Siege of Atlanta July 22-August 25. Flank movement on Jonesboro August 25–30. Battle of Jonesboro August 31-September 1. Lovejoy Station September 2–6. Operations against Hood in North Georgia and North Alabama September 29-November 3. Reconnaissance on Cave Springs Road near Rome October 12–13. March to the sea November 15-December 10. Ogeechee Canal December 9. Siege of Savannah December 10–21. Campaign of the Carolinas January to April, 1865. Salkehatchie Swamps, S.C., February 2–5. South Edisto River February 9. North Edisto River February 12–13. Columbia February 15–17. Little Cohora Creek, N. C., March 16. Battle of Bentonville, N. C., March 19–21. Mill Creek March 22. Occupation of Goldsboro March 24. Advance on Raleigh April 10–14. Occupation of Raleigh April 14. Bennett's House April 26. Surrender of Johnston and his army. March to Washington, D.C., via Richmond, Va., April 29-May 20. Grand Review May 24. Moved to Louisville, Ky., Mustered out June 16, 1865.

== See also ==
- List of Missouri Union Civil War units
