= 13th Iowa Infantry Regiment =

- Iowa state flag
- Active: October 18, 1861, to July 21, 1865
- Country: United States
- Allegiance: Union
- Branch: Infantry
- Engagements: Battle of Shiloh; Battle of Corinth; Battle of Port Gibson; Battle of Raymond; Battle of Champion's Hill; Battle of Big Black River; Siege of Vicksburg; Battle of Kennesaw Mountain; Battle of Atlanta; Battle of Ezra Church; Battle of Jonesboro; March to the Sea; Battle of Bentonville

The 13th Iowa Infantry Regiment was an infantry regiment that served in the Union Army during the American Civil War.

== Service ==
The 13th Iowa Infantry was organized at Davenport, Iowa, and mustered in for three years of Federal service between October 18 and November 2, 1861. Its troops came primarily from the Iowa counties of Linn, Jasper, Marion, Lucas, Keokuk, Scott, Polk, Benton, Marshall and Washington.

The regiment was mustered out on July 21, 1865.

== Iowa Brigade ==
After the battle of Shiloh, the Thirteenth Iowa was assigned to the Third Brigade of the Sixth Division. The brigade was composed of the Eleventh, Thirteenth, Fifteenth and Sixteenth regiments of Iowa Infantry, and was under command of Colonel Crocker. This organization remained intact until the close of the war. Except when upon detached duty, the operations of each of the regiments were identified very largely with those of the brigade, and, therefore, the history of each of these four Iowa regiments is almost inseparably interwoven with that of the brigade.

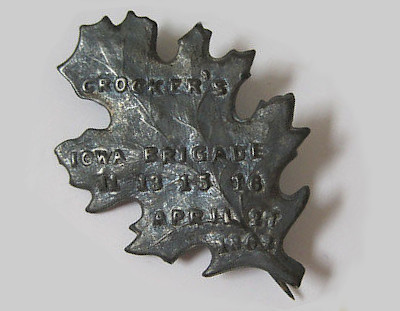

== Capture of Columbia ==
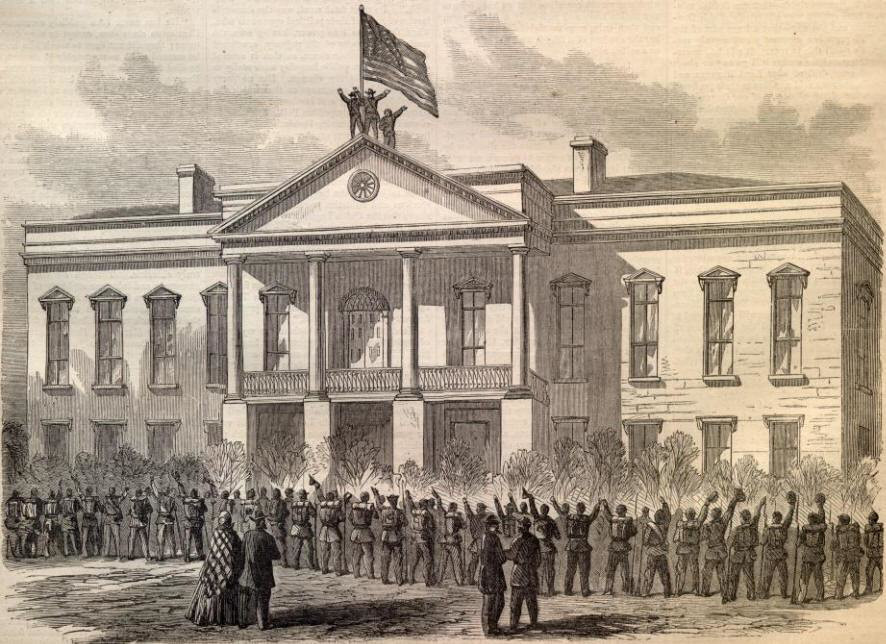
Raising the Stars and Stipes, Columbia, SC

On the 16th of February, 1865, the army, under General Sherman, came in sight of Columbia, South Carolina. Between the 17th corps and the city flowed the swift current of the Congaree River, with a rocky and dangerous channel. The sight of the capital of the state, where secession was cradled, and the state house where the first secession convention met, was calculated to stir to its depths the patriotic spirit of every soldier that looked upon them.

Col. Kennedy was undoubtedly the first man to suggest the possibility of crossing the stream and entering the city. He could have made the suggestion to no soldier more daring and enterprising than his brigade commander, Gen.Wm. W. Belknap, who approved of the attempt and ordered its execution.

The members of the 13th Iowa and the brigade have never claimed that they captured Columbia, but only that while the army was preparing to cross over the river on pontoons and in the usual and regular way take the city, these impetuous soldiers, without formal orders from army headquarters, but under orders from the orders and approval of their brigade commander, made a movement of their own, full of risk and daring, and gained the city first and planted their colors on both the old and new capital buildings."

== Total strength and casualties ==
The 13th Iowa mustered 1788 men at one time or another during its existence. It suffered 5 officers and 114 enlisted men who were killed in action or who died of their wounds and 4 officers and 205 enlisted men who died of disease, for a total of 328 fatalities.

== Commanders ==
- Colonel Marcellus M. Crocker
- Colonel John Shane
- Colonel James Wilson
- Colonel Justin C. Kennedy

== See also ==
- List of Iowa Civil War Units
- Iowa in the American Civil War
