= Marcellus M. Crocker =

Union Army general (1830–1865)

Marcellus Monroe Crocker
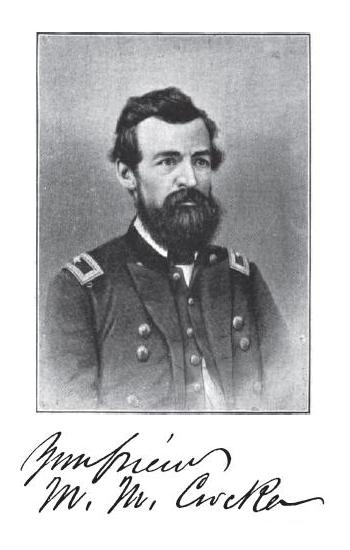
- Brig. Gen. Marcellus M. Crocker
- Born: February 6, 1830; Franklin, Indiana
- Died: August 26, 1865 (aged 35); Washington, D.C.
- Burial place: Woodland Cemetery, Des Moines, Iowa
- Military career
- Allegiance: United States of America; Union
- Branch: United States Army; Union Army
- Service years: 1861 - 1865
- Rank: Brigadier General
- Commands: 4th Division, XVII Corps
- Conflicts: American Civil War

Marcellus Monroe Crocker (February 6, 1830 – August 26, 1865) was a general in the Union Army during the American Civil War most noted for his service in the Western Theater.

== Biography ==
Crocker was born in Franklin, Indiana. He entered the United States Military Academy in 1847, but left at the end of his second year. He subsequently studied law and practiced in Des Moines, Iowa.

With the outbreak of the Civil War, he entered the army as the captain of the 2nd Iowa Infantry in May 1861. He was promoted to colonel of the 13th Iowa Infantry on December 30, 1861. Crocker fought with distinction in the Battle of Shiloh in April 1862, where he assumed command of a brigade during the first day. He commanded the "Iowa Brigade" at the Second Battle of Corinth in October, 1862. He was promoted to brigadier general on November 29, 1862.

The following year, he participated in the Vicksburg Campaign, conducting a raid in Mississippi. Crocker had brought his brigade to a high state of discipline, and it was nicknamed "Crocker's Greyhounds" for its swift marching ability. After the re-enlistment of his brigade as veteran volunteers, he assumed command of a division when General Isaac F. Quinby went on sick leave. Crocker led his division into action at the Battle of Jackson. On the morning of May 16, General Quinby returned to duty. However it was deemed necessary to retain Crocker in command of the division as it was deploying for battle at Champion Hill. Crocker received praise for his actions in that battle.

Throughout his military career Crocker suffered from consumption, which he referred to as "my old bronchial difficulty." He became very ill en route to join the army of William T. Sherman preparing for the Atlanta campaign and tendered his resignation on May 14, 1864, but it was not accepted by Secretary of War Stanton as "the department is unwilling that the Country should lose the service of so valuable an officer as General Crocker." Instead, he was offered posting to New Mexico Territory, where it was thought his health might improve in an arid climate. On June 10, 1864, Crocker gladly accepted the position and withdrew his resignation, but upon his arrival in the territory he found there was "no use of an officer of my rank in this department and I am commanding a post of six companies that could be as well or better commanded by a Captain." Yet the assignment did benefit Crocker's health, and by late 1864 he asked to return to active field service, a request supported by Ulysses S. Grant who stated "I have never seen but three or four Division commanders his equal and we want his services." Officially relieved at Santa Fe on March 1, 1865, and ordered to report to General George H. Thomas at Nashville, Crocker arrived in St. Louis on April 21, 1865, but was again so ill that he could not proceed to his new assignment with the Army of the Cumberland and he once more asked to be mustered out of service. Granted a ninety-day leave of absence, he was ordered to personally report on matters in the Southwest directly to the War Department as soon as his health allowed.

In late summer Crocker reported to the War Department, but his health continued to decline, and he died at Willard's Hotel on August 26, 1865, in Washington, D.C. He is buried in Woodland Cemetery in Des Moines, Iowa.

== Honors ==
Crocker School, that stood in Des Moines on the North side of School St. between Sixth Ave. and Seventh St. from 1870 until ca. 1962, was named after him, as is the city's present-day Crocker Street.

A bronze bust of General Crocker stands on the Vicksburg National Military Park.

The former Crocker County, established in what is now northern Kossuth County in 1870–71, was named after him.

== See also ==
- List of American Civil War generals (Union)
