= Siege of Corinth order of battle: Union =

The following units and commanders of the Union Army fought at the Siege of Corinth (29 Apr-30 May 1862) of the American Civil War. The Union Army had approximately 150,000 present for duty. The Confederate order of battle is shown separately. Order of battle compiled from the army organization during the siege.

== Abbreviations used ==
=== Military Rank ===
- MG = Major General
- BG = Brigadier General
- Col = Colonel
- Ltc = Lieutenant Colonel
- Maj = Major
- Cpt = Captain
- Lt = Lieutenant

=== Other ===
- w = wounded
- mw = mortally wounded
- k = killed

== Department of the Mississippi ==
MG Henry W. Halleck

- Second-in-Command: MG Ulysses S. Grant
- Chief of Staff and Chief Engineer: BG George W. Cullum
- Chief of Cavalry: BG Andrew J. Smith
- Chief Topographical Engineer: Col George Thom
- Aide de Camp: Col Norton Parker Chipman
- Assistant Adjutant General: Cpt John C. Kelton

=== District of West Tennessee ===
MG Ulysses S. Grant

- Chief of Staff: Col Joseph D. Webster
- Aide de Camp: Col James B. McPherson
- Provost Marshal General: Col William S. Hillyer after 3 May
- Provost Marshal General: Ltc DeWitt C. Anthony until May'
- Assistant Adjutant General: Cpt John A. Rawlins
- Chief Commissary: Cpt John Parker Hawkins

==== Right Wing (Army of the Tennessee) ====
MG George H. Thomas

- Chief of Staff and Asst. Adjutant General: Cpt George E. Flynt

Division	Brigade	Regiments and Others
First Division (Army of the Ohio); MG George H. Thomas until 3 May; BG Thomas W. Sherman	1st Brigade BG Albin F. Schoepf	12th Kentucky: Col William A. Hoskins; 17th Ohio: Col John M. Connell; 31st Ohio: Col Moses B. Walker; 38th Ohio: Col Edwin Bradley
First Division (Army of the Ohio); MG George H. Thomas until 3 May; BG Thomas W. Sherman	2nd Brigade BG Speed Smith Fry	10th Indiana: Col Mahlon D. Manson; 4th Kentucky: Col John T. Croxton; 10th Kentucky: Col John M. Harlan; 14th Ohio: Col James B. Steedman
First Division (Army of the Ohio); MG George H. Thomas until 3 May; BG Thomas W. Sherman	3rd Brigade BG Robert L. McCook	2nd Minnesota: Col James George; 9th Ohio: Maj Gustave Kammerling; 35th Ohio: Col Ferdinand Van Derveer; 18th U.S. Infantry: Ltc Oliver L. Shepherd
First Division (Army of the Ohio); MG George H. Thomas until 3 May; BG Thomas W. Sherman	Artillery	Battery D, 1st Michigan Light Artillery; Battery A, 1st Ohio Light Artillery
First Division (Army of the Ohio); MG George H. Thomas until 3 May; BG Thomas W. Sherman	Cavalry	1st Ohio Cavalry
Second Division; BG Thomas A. Davies until 2 June; BG Edward Otho Cresap Ord	1st Brigade Col James Tuttle	2nd Iowa: Cpt Richard H. Huston; 7th Iowa: Col Elliott Warren Rice; "Union Brigade": Ltc John P. Coulter; 8th Iowa, Detachment; 12th Iowa, Detachment; 14th Iowa, Detachment: Cpt Robert W. Healy; 58th Illinois, Detachment
Second Division; BG Thomas A. Davies until 2 June; BG Edward Otho Cresap Ord	2nd Brigade BG Richard J. Oglesby	9th Illinois: Col August Mersy; 12th Illinois: Col Augustus L. Chetlain; 81st Ohio: Col Thomas Morton; 13th Missouri (22nd Ohio): Col Crafts J. Wright; Birge’s Sharpshooters
Second Division; BG Thomas A. Davies until 2 June; BG Edward Otho Cresap Ord	3rd Brigade Col Silas Baldwin	7th Illinois: Col Andrew J. Babcock; 50th Illinois: Cpt John W. Smith; 52nd Illinois: Cpt Edwin A. Bowen; 57th Illinois: Ltc Frederick J. Hurlbut
Second Division; BG Thomas A. Davies until 2 June; BG Edward Otho Cresap Ord	Artillery Maj John S. Cavender	Battery D, 1st Missouri Light Artillery: Cpt Henry Richardson; Battery H, 1st Missouri Light Artillery: Battery I, 1st Missouri Light Artillery: Cpt James T. Buel; Battery K, 1st Missouri Light Artillery: Cpt George H. Stone; 2nd Michigan Battery
Second Division; BG Thomas A. Davies until 2 June; BG Edward Otho Cresap Ord	Cavalry	2nd Illinois Cavalry, 1 squadron: Cpt John R. Hotaling; 5th Ohio Cavalry, 3rd Battalion: Maj Charles S. Hayes; 4th U.S. Cavalry, Company I: Lt James Powell
Fourth Division; BG Stephen A. Hurlbut	1st Brigade BG Jacob G. Lauman	52nd Indiana: Cpt W. L. Guard transferred to 2nd Brigade May 1862; 28th Illinois: Col Amory K. Johnson; 32nd Illinois: Maj William Hunter; 41st Illinois: Col Isaac C. Pugh; 53rd Illinois: Col William H.W. Cushman; 3rd Iowa: Cpt John B. Smith
Fourth Division; BG Stephen A. Hurlbut	2nd Brigade BG James C. Veatch	25th Indiana: Cpt John Watson Foster; 53rd Indiana: Col Walter Q. Gresham; 14th Illinois: Col Cyrus Hall; 15th Illinois: Col Thomas J. Turner; 46th Illinois: Ltc John J. Jones
Fourth Division; BG Stephen A. Hurlbut	Artillery	2nd Illinois, Batteries L and B: Cpt William H. Bolton; 1st Missouri, Battery C: Cpt Charles Mann; 15th Ohio Battery: Cpt Edward Spear
Fourth Division; BG Stephen A. Hurlbut	Cavalry	5th Ohio Cavalry, 1st and 2nd Battalions: Col William H.H. Taylor
Fifth Division; MG William T. Sherman	1st Brigade Col John A. McDowell until 12 May; Col Morgan L. Smith	Before 15 May: 40th Illinois: Ltc James W. Booth; 6th Iowa: Cpt Madison Miner Walden; 46th Ohio: Col Thomas Worthington; After 15 May: 8th Missouri: Ltc James Peckham; 55th Illinois: Col David Stuart; 54th Ohio: Col Thomas Kilby Smith; 57th Ohio: Ltc Americus V. Rice
Fifth Division; MG William T. Sherman	2nd Brigade Col David Stuart until 15 May; Col John A. McDowell	Before 15 May: 55th Illinois: Ltc Oscar Malmborg; 54th Ohio: Col Thomas Kilby Smith; After 15 May: 40th Illinois: Ltc James W. Booth; 6th Iowa: Cpt Madison M. Walden; 46th Ohio: Col Thomas Worthington; 77th Ohio: Col Jesse Hildebrand; 6th Indiana Battery
Fifth Division; MG William T. Sherman	3rd Brigade Col Jesse Hildebrand until 15 May; Col Ralph P. Buckland until 16 May; BG James W. Denver	Before 15 May: 53rd Ohio: Ltc Robert A. Fulton; 57th Ohio: Ltc Americus V. Rice; 77th Ohio: Ltc Wills De Haas; After 15 May: 48th Ohio: Cpt Samuel G.W. Peterson; 53rd Ohio: Col Wells Jones; 70th Ohio: Col Joseph R. Cockerill; 72nd Ohio: Col Ralph P. Buckland
Fifth Division; MG William T. Sherman	4th Brigade Col Ralph P. Buckland	48th Ohio: Cpt Richard S. Robbins; 70th Ohio: Col Joseph R. Cockerill; 72nd Ohio: Cpt Charles G. Eaton; Discontinued 15 May
Fifth Division; MG William T. Sherman	Artillery Maj Ezra Taylor	1st Illinois Artillery, Battery B: Cpt Samuel E. Barrett; 1st Illinois Artillery, Battery E: Lt John A. Fitch; 1st Illinois Artillery, Battery H: Cpt Axel Silverparre; 1st Illinois Artillery, Battery I: Cpt Edward Bouton; 4th Indiana Battery: Lt William Mussman; 7th Ohio Battery
Fifth Division; MG William T. Sherman	Cavalry Col T. Lyle Dickey	4th Illinois Cavalry, 2nd and 3rd Battalions: Col T. Lyle Dickey; Thielemann's Illinois Cavalry, 2 companies: Maj Christian Thielemann
Sixth Division; BG Thomas J. McKean until 30 Apr; BG Thomas W. Sherman until 3 May; BG Thomas J. McKean	1st Brigade Col John L. Doran until 23 May; BG John McArthur	21st Missouri: Col David Moore; 25th Missouri: Ltc Robert T. Van Horn; 16th Wisconsin: Maj Thomas Reynolds; 17th Wisconsin: Col John L. Doran, Ltc Adam G. Malloy
Sixth Division; BG Thomas J. McKean until 30 Apr; BG Thomas W. Sherman until 3 May; BG Thomas J. McKean	2nd Brigade Col John M. Oliver	15th Michigan: Maj Stephen Walsh; 18th Missouri: Ltc John McDermott; 18th Wisconsin: Cpt Charles H. Jackson; Ford’s Company Illinois Cavalry
Sixth Division; BG Thomas J. McKean until 30 Apr; BG Thomas W. Sherman until 3 May; BG Thomas J. McKean	3rd Brigade Col Marcellus M. Crocker	11th Iowa: Ltc William Hall; 13th Iowa: Cpt George M. Van Hoesen; 15th Iowa: Ltc William Dewey; 16th Iowa: Ltc Addison H. Sanders
Sixth Division; BG Thomas J. McKean until 30 Apr; BG Thomas W. Sherman until 3 May; BG Thomas J. McKean	Artillery Cpt Andrew Hickenlooper	Battery F, 2nd Illinois Light Artillery: Lt Christian D. Bliss; 1st Minnesota Battery: Lt William Pfaender; 3rd Ohio Battery: Cpt William S. Williams; 5th Ohio Battery: Lt Lewis C. Sawyer; 10th Ohio Battery: Cpt Hamilton B. White
Sixth Division; BG Thomas J. McKean until 30 Apr; BG Thomas W. Sherman until 3 May; BG Thomas J. McKean	Cavalry	11th Illinois Cavalry, 1st and 2nd Battalions: Col Robert G. Ingersoll

==== Reserves (Army of the Tennessee) ====
MG John A. McClernand

- Assistant Inspector General: Col Thomas E. G. Ransom

Division	Brigade	Regiments and Others
First Division; MG John A. McClernand until 2 May; BG John A. Logan until 4 May; BG Henry M. Judah until 2 June; BG Thomas A. Davies	1st Brigade BG John A. Logan until 2 May; Col Michael K. Lawler until 4 May; BG John A. Logan	8th Illinois: Ltc Frank L. Rhoads; 18th Illinois: Col Michael K. Lawler; 30th Illinois: Col Elias Dennis; 31st Illinois: Ltc Lyndorf Ozburn; 12th Michigan: Col Francis Quinn
First Division; MG John A. McClernand until 2 May; BG John A. Logan until 4 May; BG Henry M. Judah until 2 June; BG Thomas A. Davies	2nd Brigade Col C. Carroll Marsh until 4 May; Col Andrew J. Babcock	11th Illinois: Ltc Thomas E. G. Ransom; 20th Illinois: Cpt Orton Frisbie; 45th Illinois: Col John Eugene Smith; 48th Illinois: Maj Manning Mayfield
First Division; MG John A. McClernand until 2 May; BG John A. Logan until 4 May; BG Henry M. Judah until 2 June; BG Thomas A. Davies	3rd Brigade BG Leonard F. Ross	17th Illinois: Maj Francis M. Smith; 29th Illinois: Col Charles M. Ferrell; 43rd Illinois: Col Adolph Englemann; 49th Illinois: Maj William W. Bishop; 61st Illinois: Col Jacob Fry
First Division; MG John A. McClernand until 2 May; BG John A. Logan until 4 May; BG Henry M. Judah until 2 June; BG Thomas A. Davies	Artillery	1st Illinois, Battery D: Lt G. S. Wood; 2nd Illinois, Battery E: Lt George L. Nispel; 14th Indiana Battery; 14th Ohio Battery
First Division; MG John A. McClernand until 2 May; BG John A. Logan until 4 May; BG Henry M. Judah until 2 June; BG Thomas A. Davies	Cavalry	4th Illinois Cavalry, 1st Battalion: Ltc William McCullough; Carmichael's Company; Dollin's Company; O'Hartnett's Company; Stewart's Company: Cpt Warren Stewart
Third Division; MG Lewis Wallace	1st Brigade Col Morgan L. Smith until 12 May; BG Alvin P. Hovey	11th Indiana: Col George Francis McGinnis; 24th Indiana: Col Alvin P. Hovey; 8th Missouri: Ltc James Peckham regiment transferred 15 May
Third Division; MG Lewis Wallace	2nd Brigade Col John M. Thayer	23rd Indiana: Col William L. Sanderson; 1st Nebraska: Ltc Robert R. Livingston; 20th Ohio: Ltc Manning F. Force; 58th Ohio: Ltc Ferdinand F. Rempel
Third Division; MG Lewis Wallace	3rd Brigade Col Charles Whittlesey until May; Col Charles R. Woods	56th Ohio: Col Peter Kinney; 68th Ohio: Col Samuel H. Steedman; 76th Ohio: Maj Willard Warner; 78th Ohio: Col Mortimer D. Leggett
Third Division; MG Lewis Wallace	Artillery	1st Illinois Artillery, Battery A: Lt Peter P. Wood; 1st Illinois Artillery, Battery F; Cogswell's Illinois Battery: Cpt William Cogswell; 9th Indiana Battery: Cpt Noah S. Thompson; 8th Ohio Battery: Lt John W. Wellshear
Third Division; MG Lewis Wallace	Cavalry	11th Illinois Cavalry, 3rd Battalion: Cpt Otto Funke

=== Center (Army of the Ohio) ===
MG Don Carlos Buell

- Chief of Staff: Col James Barnet Fry
- Assistant Inspector General: Maj Adam J. Slemmer
- Assistant Inspector General: Cpt Charles Champion Gilbert
- Assistant Quartermaster: Cpt Alvan C. Gillem (until May 1862)
- Assistant Quartermaster: Cpt Andrew J. Mackay (May 1862)
- Chief Engineer: Cpt James St. Clair Morton

Division	Brigade	Regiments and Others
Second Division; BG Alexander M. McCook	4th Brigade BG Lovell H. Rousseau	15th U.S. Infantry, 1st Battalion: Maj John H. King; 16th U.S. Infantry, 1st Battalion: Cpt Edwin F. Townsend; 19th U.S. Infantry, 1st Battalion: Stephen D. Carpenter; 1st Ohio: Col Benjamin F. Smith; 6th Indiana: Col Thomas Turpin Crittenden; 5th Kentucky: Col Harvey M. Buckley
Second Division; BG Alexander M. McCook	5th Brigade Col Frederick S. Stumbaugh	77th Pennsylvania: Col Frederick Stumbaugh; 29th Indiana: Col John F. Miller; 30th Indiana: Ltc Joseph B. Dodge; 34th Illinois: Ltc Hiram Bristol
Second Division; BG Alexander M. McCook	6th Brigade BG Richard W. Johnson	15th Ohio: Col Moses R. Dickey; 49th Ohio: Col William Harvey Gibson; 32nd Indiana: Col August Willich; 39th Indiana: Col Thomas J. Harrison
Second Division; BG Alexander M. McCook	Artillery Cpt William R. Terrill	Battery A, Kentucky Light Artillery; Ohio Battery; Pennsylvania Battery; Battery H, 5th U.S. Artillery
Fourth Division; MG William "Bull" Nelson	10th Brigade Col Jacob Ammen	36th Indiana: Col William Grose; 17th Kentucky: Col John McHenry II; 6th Ohio: Ltc Nicholas L. Anderson; 24th Ohio: Ltc Frederick C. Jones
Fourth Division; MG William "Bull" Nelson	19th Brigade Col William B. Hazen	6th Kentucky: Col Walter C. Whitaker; 27th Kentucky: Col Charles D. Pennebaker; 41st Ohio: Ltc George Mygatt
Fourth Division; MG William "Bull" Nelson	22nd Brigade Col Thomas D. Sedgewick until 30 May; BG Mahlon D. Manson	31st Indiana: Ltc John Osborn; 1st Kentucky: Col David Enyart; 2nd Kentucky: Ltc Warner Spencer; Col Thomas D. Sedgewick; 20th Kentucky: Ltc Charles S. Hanson
Fourth Division; MG William "Bull" Nelson	Artillery	Battery I, 4th U.S. Artillery: Cpt John Mendenhall
Fourth Division; MG William "Bull" Nelson	Cavalry Ltc Edward M. McCook	2nd Indiana Cavalry: Ltc Edward M. McCook; 3rd Indiana Cavalry, one company
Fifth Division; BG Thomas L. Crittenden	11th Brigade BG Jeremiah T. Boyle until 27 May; Col Samuel Beatty	19th Ohio: Col Samuel Beatty; 59th Ohio: Col James P. Fyffe; 9th Kentucky: Col Benjamin C. Grider; 13th Kentucky: Col Edward H. Hobson
Fifth Division; BG Thomas L. Crittenden	14th Brigade BG Horatio P. Van Cleve	13th Ohio: Col William Sooy Smith; 11th Kentucky: Col Pierce B. Hawkins; 26th Kentucky: Col Stephen G. Burbridge
Fifth Division; BG Thomas L. Crittenden	Cavalry	3rd Kentucky Cavalry: Col James S. Jackson
Fifth Division; BG Thomas L. Crittenden	Artillery	Battery G, 1st Ohio Light Artillery; Battery H, 4th U.S. Artillery; Battery M, 4th U.S. Artillery
Sixth Division; BG Thomas J. Wood	15th Brigade BG Milo Hascall	17th Indiana: Col John T. Wilder; 58th Indiana: Col George P. Buell; 3rd Kentucky: Col Thomas E. Bramlette; 26th Ohio: Col Edward P. Fyffe; 8th Indiana Battery
Sixth Division; BG Thomas J. Wood	20th Brigade BG James A. Garfield	51st Indiana: Col Abel Streight; 13th Michigan: Col Michael Shoemaker; 64th Ohio: Col John Ferguson; 65th Ohio: Col Charles G. Harker
Sixth Division; BG Thomas J. Wood	21st Brigade Col George D. Wagner	15th Indiana: Col Gustavus A. Wood; 57th Indiana: Col Cyrus Hines; 24th Kentucky: Col Louis Grisgsby

=== Left Wing (Army of the Mississippi) ===
MG John Pope

- Chief of Staff: BG Washington L. Elliott after 12 June
- Assistant Adjutant General: Maj Speed Butler
- Assistant Inspector General: Maj John M. Corse
- Assistant Quartermaster: Cpt Philip H. Sheridan

Division	Brigade	Regiments and Others
Cavalry Division; BG Gordon Granger	1st Brigade Col William P. Kellogg until 1 June; Col John K. Mizner	3rd Michigan Cavalry: Ltc Robert H.G. Minty; 7th Illinois Cavalry: Col William P. Kellogg
Cavalry Division; BG Gordon Granger	2nd Brigade Col Washington Lafayette Elliott until 1 June; Col Philip H. Sheridan	2nd Iowa Cavalry: Ltc Edward Hatch; 2nd Michigan Cavalry: Col Philip H. Sheridan appointed 25 May
Cavalry Division; BG Gordon Granger	Artillery	Powell's Battery
Reporting Directly	Reserve Brigade Col William P. Carlin	21st Illinois: Ltc George Peck; 38th Illinois: Ltc Daniel H. Gilmer; Hotchkiss’ Minnesota Battery
Reporting Directly	Artillery Brigade Ltc Warren L. Lothrop	2nd Illinois Light Artillery, Battery I: Cpt Charles M. Barnett; Battery M, 1st Missouri Light Artillery: Cpt Albert M. Powell; 5th Wisconsin Battery: Cpt Oscar F. Pinney
Reporting Directly	Unattached Units	Missouri Engineers: Col Josiah W. Bissell; 1st U.S. Infantry: Cpt George A. Williams; 4th U.S. Cavalry: Cpt Eugene W. Crittenden

==== Right Wing ====
MG William S. Rosecrans assigned 29 May

Division	Brigade	Regiments and Others
First Division; BG Eleazar Paine	1st Brigade BG John M. Palmer	22nd Illinois: Ltc Harrison E. Hart; 27th Illinois: Ltc Fazilo Harrington; 42nd Illinois: Col George W. Roberts; 51st Illinois: Col Gilbert W. Cumming
First Division; BG Eleazar Paine	2nd Brigade Col James D. Morgan until 1 May; BG Daniel Tyler	10th Illinois: Ltc John Tillson, Col James D. Morgan; 16th Illinois: Col Robert F. Smith; 60th Illinois: Col Silas C. Toler; 10th Michigan: Col Charles M. Lum; 14th Michigan: Col Robert P. Sinclair; Yates’ Sharpshooters: Ltc David E. Williams
First Division; BG Eleazar Paine	Artillery	1st Illinois, Battery C; 1st Missouri Artillery, Battery G
Second Division; BG David S. Stanley	1st Brigade Col John Groesbeck until 8 July; Col Joseph L. Kirby Smith	27th Ohio: Col John W. Fuller; 39th Ohio: Col John Groesbeck, Ltc Alfred W. Gilbert; 43rd Ohio: Col J.L. Kirby Smith; 63rd Ohio: Col John W. Sprague
Second Division; BG David S. Stanley	2nd Brigade BG Joseph B. Plummer until 29 May; Col Robert C. Murphy	26th Illinois: Col John M. Loomis; 47th Illinois: Col William Thrush; 5th Minnesota: Col Rudolph von Borgersode (joined 10-24 May 1862); 11th Missouri: Col Joseph A. Mower; 8th Wisconsin: Col Robert C. Murphy
Second Division; BG David S. Stanley	Artillery	2nd Iowa Battery; 1st Michigan, Battery C; 2nd U.S. Artillery, Battery F

==== Left Wing ====
BG Schuyler Hamilton assigned 29 May

Division	Brigade	Regiments and Others
Third Division; BG Schuyler Hamilton until 29 May; BG Joseph B. Plummer	1st Brigade BG Napoleon B. Buford	48th Indiana: Col Norman Eddy; 59th Indiana: Col Jesse I. Alexander; 5th Iowa: Col William H. Worthington (k, 22 May 1862), Ltc Karl Leopold Matthias; 4th Minnesota: Col John B. Sanborn; 26th Missouri: Col John H. Holman
Third Division; BG Schuyler Hamilton until 29 May; BG Joseph B. Plummer	2nd Brigade Col Nicholas Perczel	56th Illinois: Ltc William R. Brown; 10th Iowa: Ltc William E. Small; 10th Missouri: Col Samuel Holmes; 26th Missouri: Col George B. Boomer; 80th Ohio: Col Ephraim R. Eckley
Third Division; BG Schuyler Hamilton until 29 May; BG Joseph B. Plummer	Artillery	11th Ohio Battery: Cap Frank C. Sands; Battery G, 1st Missouri Light Artillery; Buell’s Battery Missouri Light Artillery; 6th Wisconsin Battery; 12th Wisconsin Battery
Fourth Division; BG Jefferson C. Davis	1st Brigade BG Robert B. Mitchell	22nd Indiana: Maj Michael Gooding; 59th Illinois: Col Philip S. Post
Fourth Division; BG Jefferson C. Davis	Asboth's Brigade BG Alexander Asboth	2nd Missouri: Col Frederick Schaefer; 15th Missouri: Col Francis Joliat; 36th Illinois: Col Nicholas Greusel; 44th Illinois: Col Charles Knobelsdorff
Fifth Division created 1 June; BG Alexander Asboth	1st Brigade Col Nicholas Greusel	36th Illinois: Col Nicholas Greusel; 44th Illinois: Col Charles Knobelsdorff
Fifth Division created 1 June; BG Alexander Asboth	2nd Brigade Ltc Bernard Laiboldt	2nd Missouri: Maj Francis Ehrler; 15th Missouri: Maj Joseph Conrad

== Sources ==
- U.S. War Department, The War of the Rebellion: a Compilation of the Official Records of the Union and Confederate Armies, U.S. Government Printing Office, 1880–1901.
- Eicher, John H., and David J. Eicher. Civil War High Commands. Stanford, CA: Stanford University Press, 2001. ISBN 0-8047-3641-3.
- Dyer, Frederick H. A compendium of the War of the Rebellion, Volume 1, Des Moines IA: The Dyer Publishing Co.. 1908
