= Battle of Hatchie Bridge =

1862 battle of the American Civil War

Coordinates: 35.0350°N 88.7994°W

- Part of American Civil War
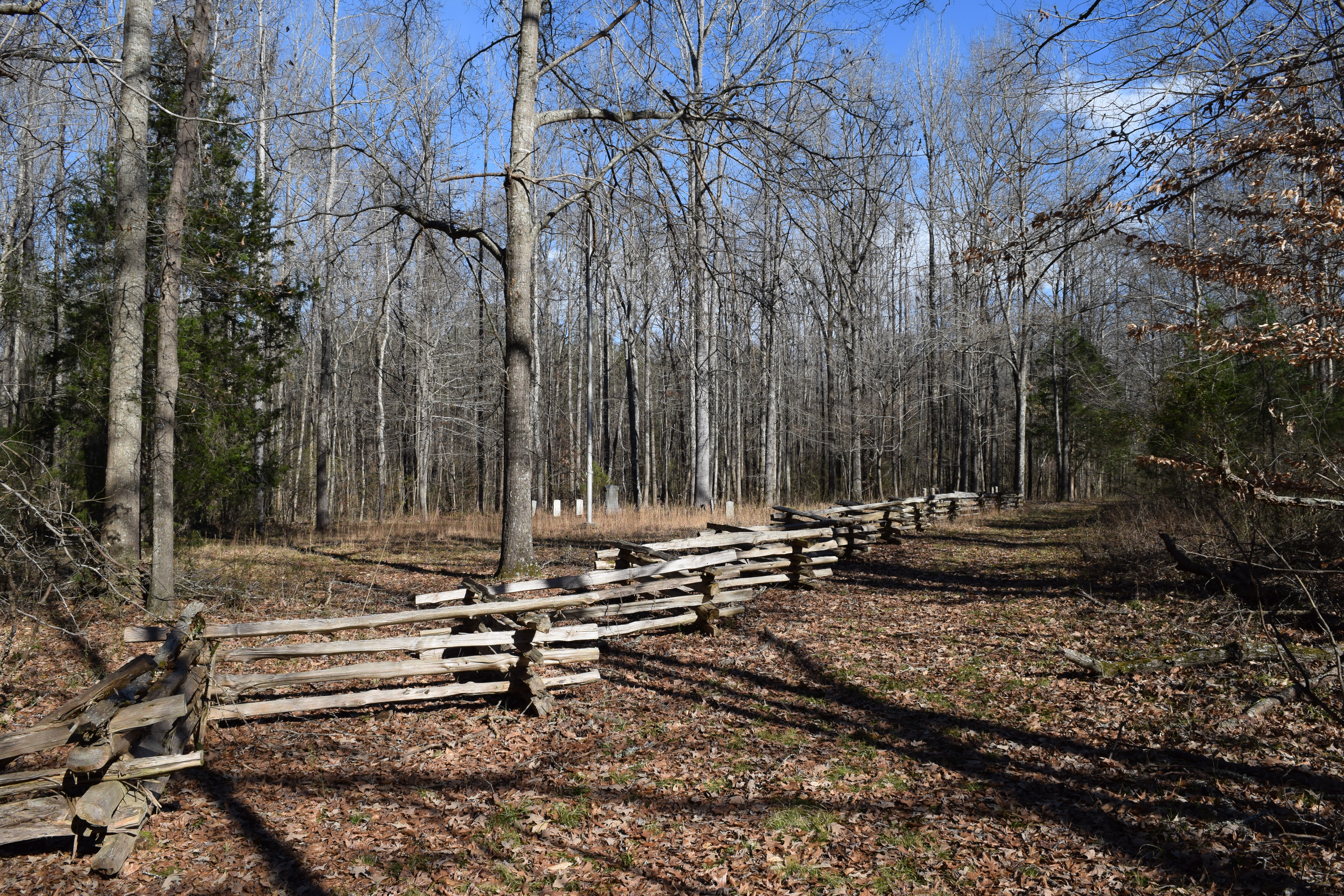
- Davis Bridge Battlefield in 2019
Date	October 5, 1862
Location	Hardeman and McNairy Counties, Tennessee
Result	Confederate victory

Belligerents
United States (Union)	Confederate States

Commanders and leaders
(United States) Edward O.C. Ord	(Confederate States of America) Earl Van Dorn

Units involved
District of Jackson	Army of the West Tennessee

Casualties and losses
500	400
- Location within Tennessee

The Battle of Hatchie Bridge, also known as Battle of Davis Bridge or Battle of Matamora, was fought on October 5, 1862, in Hardeman County and McNairy County, Tennessee, as the final engagement of the Iuka–Corinth Campaign of the American Civil War. Confederate Major General Earl Van Dorn's army successfully evaded capture by the Union Army, following his defeat at the Battle of Corinth.

== History ==
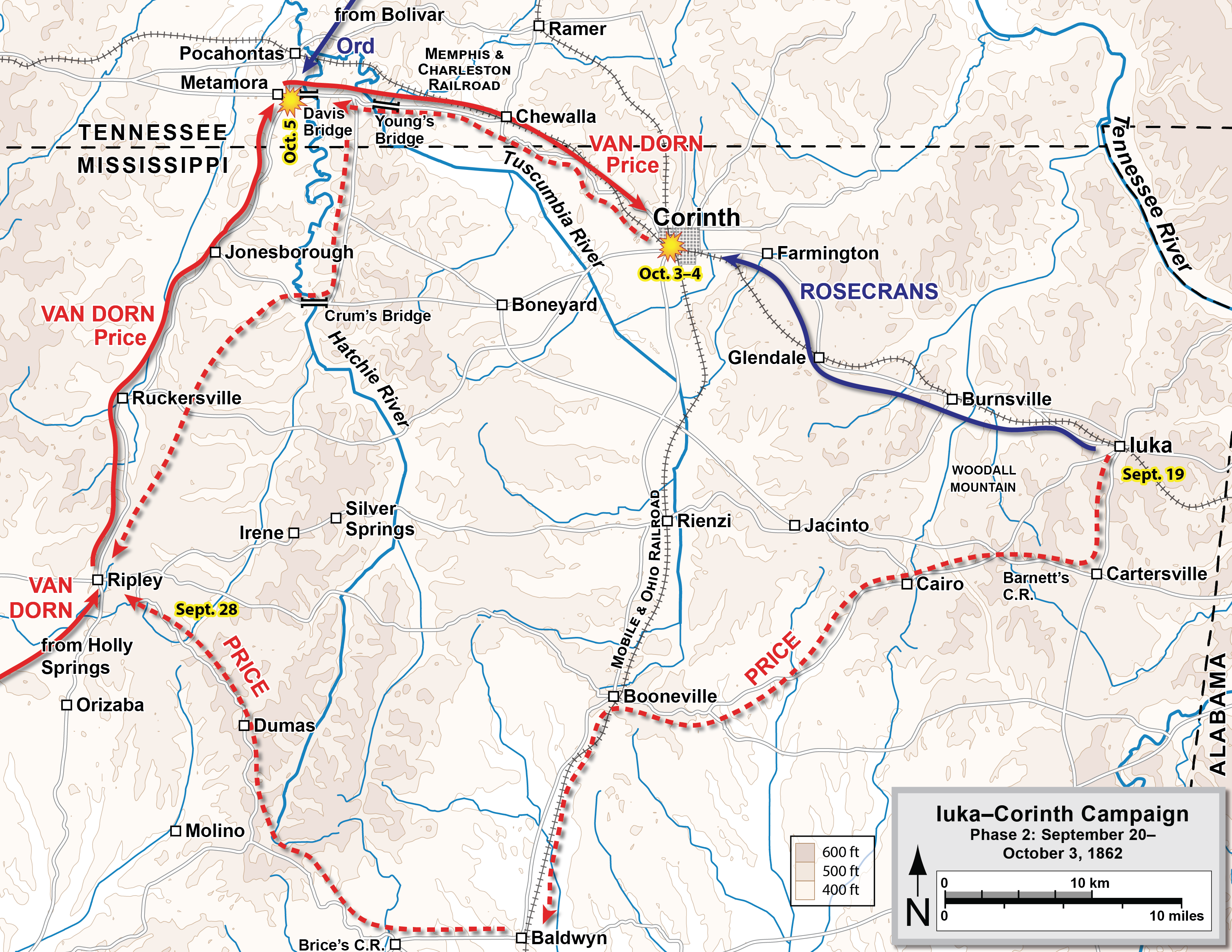
Phase 2 of the Iuka–Corinth Campaign

Van Dorn's Army of West Tennessee retreated from Corinth, Mississippi, on October 4, 1862, but Union Maj. Gen. William S. Rosecrans did not send forces in pursuit until the morning of October 5. Maj. Gen. Edward O.C. Ord, commanding a detachment of Ulysses S. Grant's Army of the Tennessee, was, pursuant to orders, advancing on Corinth to assist Rosecrans. On the night of October 4–5, he camped near Pocahontas.

Between 7:30 and 8:00 a.m. the next morning, his force encountered Union Maj. Gen. Stephen A. Hurlbut's 4th Division, District of Jackson, in the Confederates' front. Ord took command of the now-combined Union forces and pushed Van Dorn's advanced element, Maj. Gen. Sterling Price's Army of the West, back about five miles to the Hatchie River and across Davis's Bridge. After accomplishing this, Ord was wounded in the ankle and Hurlbut assumed command. While Price's men were hotly engaged with Ord's force, Van Dorn's scouts looked for and found another crossing of the Hatchie River. Van Dorn then led his army back to Holly Springs. Grant ordered Rosecrans to abandon the pursuit. Ord had forced Price to retreat, but the Confederates escaped capture or destruction. Although they should have done so, Rosecrans's army had failed to capture or destroy Van Dorn's force.

== Order of battle ==
Union
District of Jackson – Major General Edward O. C. Ord (w)

Hatchie's Bridge: Union Order of Battle
Division	Brigade	Regiments and Others
4th Division; MG Stephen A. Hurlbut	Cavalry Escort	Company A, 2nd Illinois Cavalry
4th Division; MG Stephen A. Hurlbut	1st Brigade BG Jacob G. Lauman	3rd Iowa Infantry: Lt Col Matthew M. Trumbull; 28th Illinois Infantry: Col Amory K. Johnson; 32nd Illinois Infantry: Col John Logan; 41st Illinois Infantry: Col Isaac C. Pugh; 53rd Illinois Infantry; Battery C, 1st Missouri Light Artillery; 15th Ohio Battery; 5th Ohio Cavalry (1st and 2nd Battalions)
4th Division; MG Stephen A. Hurlbut	2nd Brigade BG James C. Veatch (w)	14th Illinois Infantry: Col Cyrus Hall; 15th Illinois Infantry; 46th Illinois Infantry: Col John A. Davis (mw); 25th Indiana Infantry; 53rd Indiana Infantry; Battery L, 2nd Illinois Light Artillery; 7th Ohio Battery
4th Division; MG Stephen A. Hurlbut	Provisional Brigade Col Robert K. Scott	12th Michigan Infantry; 68th Ohio Infantry

Confederate
Army of West Tennessee – Major General Earl Van Dorn

Price's Corps – Major General Sterling Price

== Battlefield preservation ==
- Davis Bridge Battlefield
- U.S. National Register of Historic Places
- Nearest city: Pocahontas, Tennessee
- MPS: Archeological Resources of the American Civil War in Tennessee MPS
- NRHP reference No.: 97001549
- Added to NRHP: July 13, 1998

The battlefield site, known as Davis Bridge Battlefield, was listed on the National Register of Historic Places in 1998. A 5-acre (20,000 m^{2}) area of the battlefield is part of the Siege and Battle of Corinth Sites, which was designated a National Historic Landmark in 1991. The total battlefield area deemed potentially eligible for the National Register is 5,103 acres (2,065 ha), of which 861.5 acres (348.6 ha) has protected status. The American Battlefield Trust and its partners have acquired and preserved 860 acres (3.5 km^{2}) of the battlefield as of mid-2023.
