= Army of West Tennessee (Confederate) =

Field army of the Confederate States

- Active: September–December 1862
- Country: Confederate States
- Branch: Army
- Size: Field army
- Battles: American Civil War; Battle of Corinth; Battle of Hatchie Bridge

Commanders
- Commanding officer: Maj. Gen. Earl Van Dorn

The Army of West Tennessee was a field army of the Confederate States in the Western Theater of the American Civil War. It participated in the battles of Corinth, and Hatchie Bridge before being merged into the Army of Mississippi on December 9, 1862.

== History ==
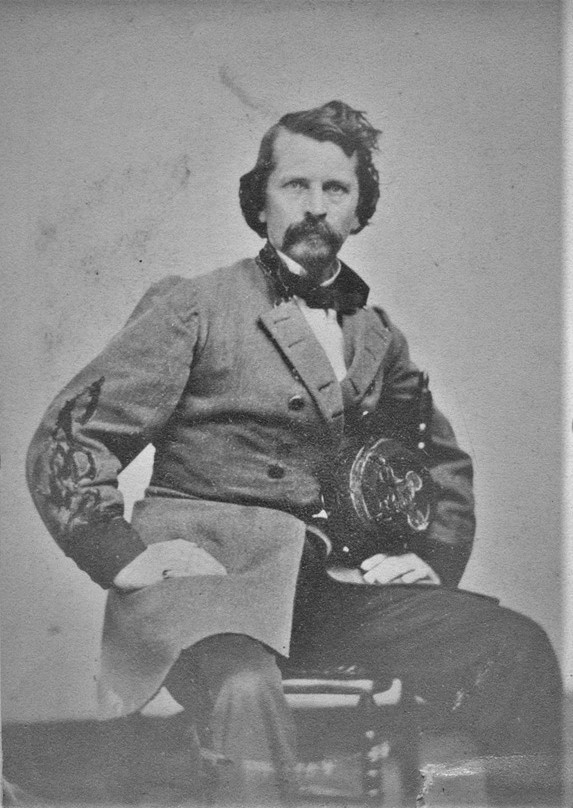
Maj. Gen. Earl van Dorn

As part of his preparations for the Perryville offensive, General Braxton Bragg divided Mississippi into several commands: Major General Earl Van Dorn was given command of the District of the Mississippi, centered in Vicksburg, and Major General Sterling Price was given the District of the Tennessee, covering northwestern Mississippi and northeastern Alabama. Bragg expected Price to prevent the Union forces of Ulysses S. Grant and William Rosecrans in western Tennessee from reinforcing the Union forces in Kentucky, and expected Van Dorn to cooperate with Price. Price interpreted Bragg's orders as to mean that he was to attack the Union forces. Van Dorn, however, choose to move against the Union forces threatening Vicksburg and launched an attack on Baton Rouge, Louisiana, which failed; he then proposed a joint attack with Price on Corinth. Price by this time had decided not to wait for Van Dorn but moved against Iuka, capturing the town on September 14. Two Union columns, commanded by Grant and Rosecrans, converged on Iuka on September 19; Price attacked Rosecrans' force and due to poor communications and an acoustic shadow Grant failed to attack in concert. When he discovered that Grant was approaching from the northwest, Price decided to retreat before he was surrounded.

Price united with Van Dorn at Ripley, Mississippi, on September 28 and placed himself under his command. Price's army was redesignated as Price's Corps; the other parts of Van Dorn's army were the forces of his District of the Mississippi, Mansfield Lovell's infantry division and a small cavalry brigade commanded by Colonel W. H. Jackson (this force reported directly to Van Dorn). Van Dorn then laid out a planned offensive against Corinth: the Confederates would first march to Pocahontas, 19 miles (31 km) northwest of Corinth, to confuse Grant and Rosecrans, then they would attack Corinth before the Union forces could concentrate. Although several officers, including Price and Lovell, were opposed to the plan, they still followed Van Dorn's orders. The march began on September 29 and the Confederates arrived outside Corinth on October 3.

The two-day Battle of Corinth began on October 3, with Confederate attacks overrunning the first line of Union entrenchments north of Corinth. Much of the fighting was done by Price's corps on the Confederate left; Lovell on the Confederate right overran the initial Union positions and then halted, perhaps due to his objections to the campaign. Price had to halt his attacks close to dusk due to increasing disorganization in his divisions and to Lovell's inactivity. The next day, Van Dorn planned another series of attacks, starting at daylight with Louis Hebert's division of Price's corps on the left flank, with the remaining units continuing the attack. However, the attack was delayed when Hebert reported himself sick and his successor had to be informed of the attack plan and move his division into position. Price's two divisions were able to capture several parts of the Union second line of fortifications, with some units entering the town of Corinth itself, but Union counterattacks forced the Confederates back. Lovell failed to attack at all.

Following the repulse of Price's attacks, Van Dorn decided to retreat towards the Davis Bridge over the Hatchie River that evening, with Price's corps in front and Lovell's division serving as rear guard; he briefly considered attacking Corinth again from the southwest but was talked out of it by Price. The next day, the Confederates learned that another Union force commanded by Stephen A. Hurlbut was approaching from the west towards the Davis Bridge, thus cutting off the Confederate line of retreat. One of Price's divisions was assigned to delay Hurlbut until the rest of the army reached another crossing six miles to the south; during the resulting engagement, the Confederates were able to delay Hurlbut sufficiently to enable their escape. Van Dorn reached Ripley on October 7, but due to the poor condition of his army and a shortage of supplies at Ripley he decided to continue onto Holly Springs.

During the Corinth campaign, Price lost over 3,700 casualties out of 13,800 men, nearly 35 percent of his force; Lovell, by contrast, lost only 570 out of 7,000 men. Both Lovell and Van Dorn were blamed for the Confederate defeat, with Lovell especially criticized by Price's troops. In December, Van Dorn's command was abolished and merged with Price's command into a new Department of Mississippi and East Louisiana commanded by John C. Pemberton; Van Dorn himself was reassigned to a cavalry corps.

== See also ==
- Second Corinth Confederate order of battle
