= Isaac C. Pugh =

- Born: November 23, 1805; Christian County, Kentucky
- Died: November 19, 1874 (aged 68); Decatur, Illinois
- Burial place: Greenwood Cemetery
- Military career
- Allegiance: United States of America; Union
- Branch: United States Army; Union Army
- Service years: 1832, 1846–1847, 1861–1864
- Rank: Colonel; Brevet Brigadier General
- Units: 4th Regiment of Illinois Volunteers; 8th Illinois Infantry Regiment
- Commands: 41st Illinois Infantry Regiment; 1st Brigade, 4th Division, XVI Corps
- Conflicts: Black Hawk War; Mexican War; American Civil War: Battle of Fort Donelson; Battle of Shiloh; Siege of Corinth; Battle of Hatchie's Bridge; Siege of Vicksburg; Siege of Jackson
- Other work: merchant, clerk, postmaster

Isaac Campbell Pugh (November 23, 1805 – November 19, 1874) was a United States volunteer soldier who was a veteran of the Black Hawk War, the Mexican–American War and the American Civil War; rising to the rank of Brevet brigadier general.

== Early life ==
Pugh was born in Christian County, Kentucky. He moved to Macon County, Illinois and became a private and served during the Black Hawk War. In 1846 he became a captain in the 4th Illinois Volunteer Regiment during the Mexican War and was mustered out of the volunteer service the following year.

== Civil War ==
=== Fort Donelson ===
Pugh's most notable military service came during the American Civil War. He volunteered and became the captain of Company A of the 8th Illinois Infantry Regiment when it was mustered in on 23 April 1861. When the 8th was demobilized three months later, he formed the 41st Illinois Volunteer Regiment which he commanded as colonel, and would chiefly be associated with for the rest of the war. Pugh led the regiment into action at the Battle of Fort Donelson fighting as part of John McArthur's brigade on the extreme right of the Union line.

=== Shiloh ===
After Fort Donelson the 41st Illinois was assigned to the 1st Brigade in Stephen A. Hurlbut's 4th Division of the Army of the Tennessee. Shortly after the fighting began at the Battle of Shiloh, the 1st Brigade's commander Col. Nelson G. Williams was severely wounded and command of the brigade was turned over to Pugh. Colonel Pugh ably led the brigade through the two days of fighting at Shiloh in the vicinity of "Bloody Pond".

=== Vicksburg and Jackson ===
After Shiloh, General Jacob G. Lauman was transferred to command the brigade and Pugh returned to command of his regiment. He led his unit in the subsequent Siege of Corinth and the Battle of Hatchie's Bridge. When General Lauman was elevated to command of the 4th Division, Pugh again assumed command of the 1st Brigade. Pugh's brigade and the rest of the division were assigned to the XVI Corps during the Siege of Vicksburg and the following expedition against Jackson, Mississippi. During the Jackson Expedition, General Lauman ordered Pugh to make an attack against Brig. Gen. Daniel W. Adams' entrenched brigade. This attack resulted in heavy casualties for Pugh's brigade and Lauman was subsequently relieved of command.

=== Furlough and Atlanta Campaign ===
Pugh continued in brigade command until October 1863 when the veteran officers and soldiers of the 41st Illinois were granted a furlough while the new recruits in the regiment fought in the Red River Campaign and at Tupelo. Pugh returned to active duty with the veterans of the regiment in 1864. Instead of reuniting the entire regiment in Mississippi, Pugh commanded the so-called "Veterans Battalion" of the 41st Illinois and was sent to Georgia to join William T. Sherman's campaign against Atlanta. Pugh's Veteran Battalion was assigned to railroad guard duty near Marietta, Georgia. Pugh briefly commanded the 2nd Brigade, 4th Division in the XVII Corps which was composed of regiments primarily on guard duty in Georgia. He was mustered out of the volunteer service with the rest of his regiment on August 20, 1864.

Command History

- 1st Brigade, 4th Division, Army of the Tennessee (6–7 April 1862)
- 1st Brigade, 4th Division, XIII Corps (1 Nov-18 Dec 1862)
- 1st Brigade, 4th Division, XVII Corps (18 Dec 1862-20 Jan 1863)
- 1st Brigade, 4th Division, XVI Corps (20 Jan-28 July 1863)
- 1st Brigade, 4th Division, XIII Corps (28 July-17 Aug 1863)
- 1st Brigade, 4th Division, XVII Corps (17 Aug-24 Oct 1863)
- 2nd Brigade, 4th Division, XVIII Corps (4–19 July 1864)

== Later life ==
Pugh returned to his home in Decatur, Illinois and served as a clerk and postmaster there before his death on November 19, 1874. He is buried in Greenwood Cemetery in Decatur.

== See also ==
- List of American Civil War brevet generals
