= 53rd Illinois Infantry Regiment =

53rd Regiment Illinois Volunteer Infantry
- Also known as the 53rd Illinois or 53rd Illinois Volunteers
- Illinois state flag
- Active: Jan. 1862 – July 22, 1865
- Country: United States
- Allegiance: (United States) Union; Illinois
- Branch: Union Army
- Type: Infantry
- Size: Regiment
- Equipment: Rifled musket
- Engagements: American Civil War; Battle of Shiloh (1862); Battle of Hatchie's Bridge (1862); Siege of Vicksburg (1863); Battle of Jackson (1863); Atlanta Campaign (1864); Sherman's March to the Sea (1864); Carolinas campaign (1865); Battle of Bentonville (1865)

Insignia
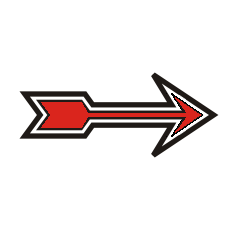
- XVII Corps

The 53rd Regiment Illinois Volunteer Infantry was an infantry regiment from Illinois that served in the Union Army during the American Civil War. The regiment fought at Shiloh, Hatchie's Bridge, Vicksburg, the March to the Sea, the Carolinas campaign, and Bentonville. After the war ended, it participated in the Grand Review of the Armies before being mustered out of service.

== Service ==
The 53rd Illinois Infantry was organized at Ottawa, Illinois, and mustered into Federal service in January 1862.

The companies of the regiment were recruited in the counties of:

- Company A – LaSalle County – Captain Josiah B. Wright
- Company B – LaSalle and Grundy counties – Captain Rolland H. Allison
- Company C – LaSalle County – Captain Joseph E. Skinner
- Company D – LaSalle County – Captain James E. Hudson
- Company E – Kankakee and Mason counties – Captain Charles M. Vaughn
- Company F – LaSalle County – Captain Seth C. Earl
- Company G – Livingston and Shelby counties – Captain Morgan L. Paine
- Company H – Marshall and Peoria counties – John W. McClanahan
- Company I (later reorganized in 1864) – LaSalle County – ? (New company I was Samuel J. Harney)
- Company K – LaSalle County – Captain Michael Leahey

=== Early service ===
The regiment was sent to Chicago to guard Confederate prisoners who were captured from the Battle of Fort Donelson and were then sent to St. Louis on March 23, and to Savannah. On April 6, the regiment was ordered to Shiloh, but did not arrive there until the afternoon of April 7. The regiment was later engaged at the Battle of Shiloh

=== Service at Mississippi and Tennessee ===
The regiment was assigned to the 1st Brigade (commanded by Jacob G.Lauman), 4th Division (Commanded by Stephen A. Hurlbut), of XVII Corps which would remain in there until the end of the war.

The 53rd was then engaged in the Siege of Corinth, where they were given Springfield Rifled Muskets for their exceptional performance. After the siege, the regiment marched through Tennessee and arrived at Memphis on July 21, 1862. During the march, the regiment experienced bad weather, which lead to the men suffering heatstroke and a lack of water.

On September 6, the regiment marched to Bolivar, Tennessee, and arrived on September 13. On October 1, while the regiment had moved to LaGrange again, they encountered a large body of Confederate forces there and retreated back to Bolivar.

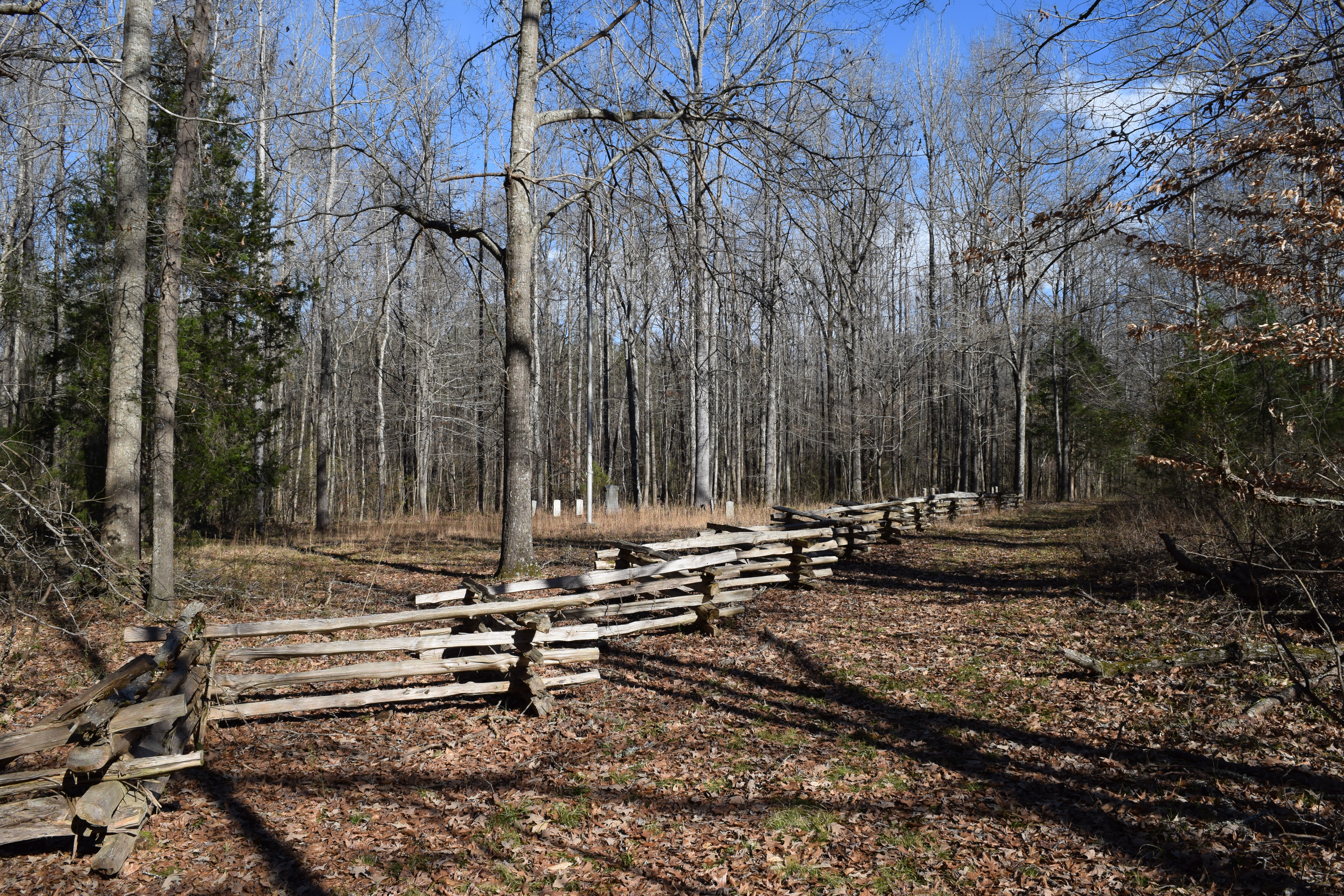
The memorial site at Davis Bridge Battlefield in Hardeman County, Tennessee.

=== Battle of Hatchie Bridge ===
On October 4, the regiment was engaged with Confederate forces at the Battle of Hatchie Bridge, where it attacked the enemy at least four times, who were retreating after the Second Battle of Corinth.

During the battle, the regiment crossed Davis' Bridge on the Hatchie River, when a federal regiment was forced to retreat, and the 53rd had to hold the bridge for at least two hours, long enough for other Union troops to retreat back. The regiment would assist in supporting a section of Union artillery from Missouri. The regiment lost 16 killed and 49 wounded, and was complimented by Hurlbut for their gallantry.

=== Vicksburg Campaign ===
After the battle, the 53rd headed back to Bolivar, where on October 15, Lt. Col. Seth C. Earl, after Col. William Cushman resigned. On November 4, 1862, the regiment marched to La Grange, before linking up with Grant's army, marching from Cold Water, to arriving at Yocona Creek on December 13, subsequently marching to the Tallahatchie River on the 22.

On January 1, 1863, the 4th Division was assigned to the XVII Corps (commanded by James B. McPherson), and were sent to guard the Memphis & Charleston Railroad. the regiment headed back to Memphis on March 11, before joining in the Siege of Vicksburg on May 25, with the regiment positioned in the left flank. During this period, Maj Gen. E. O. C. Ord was temporarily assigned as the commander of the 4th Division.

=== Jackson Expedition ===
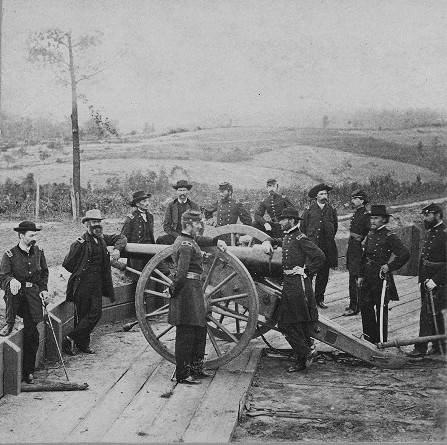
U.S. Army Major-General William T. Sherman and his staff on July 18, 1864, on the lines before Atlanta, Georgia.

On July 5, the regiment joined on the Jackson Expedition, and participated in the Battle of Jackson. On July 12, the 53rd, alongside the 1st Brigade, charged against the Confederate fortifications, but suffered heavy losses in it, only leaving behind 66 men after the charge. During the charge, Colonel Seth C. Earl was killed, alongside several officers, either wounded, captured or killed. The color and bearers were all killed or wounded, and the regimental colors were all captured.

=== Re-enlistment and the Atlanta Campaign ===
After the battle, the regiment returned to Vicksburg, and the brigade, now under Marcellus M. Crocker, marched to Natchez, remaining there until November 30, returning to Vicksburg. On February 1, 1864, the regiment re-enlisted as veterans and joined in on the Meridian Campaign.

After the campaign, the regiment was given a 20-day furlough, and had Companies I and E consolidated, and Company I was formed up. After the furlough, the regiment rejoined the 4th Division at Cairo, Illinois, now commanded by Maj. Gen. Francis Preston Blair Jr. After marching through the Tennessee River and into Georgia, linking up with Sherman's army at Kingston, Georgia.

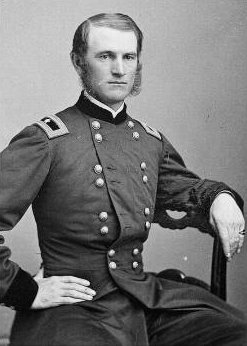
Maj. Gen Thomas E. G. Ransom

The 53rd was ordered to Allatoona Pass on June 8, and constructed breastworks to every side of the pass until July 13, rejoining the division at Marietta. The regiment was then heavily engaged at the Siege of Atlanta, losing over 101 men killed or wounded and lost several officers, those being Captain Samuel I. Haynie and Sergeant Major Oran M. Bull. The regiment subsequently participated in the Battle of Jonesborough as skirmishers, then marched up to Lovejoy Station before returning to East Point to rest.

=== Escorts for Ranson ===
The regiment then had to pursuit Hood's army by heading north, following them to Gaylesville, Alabama, where they rested for a week or so. On October 27, the XVII Corps received orders to march around the vicinity of Atlanta, when Maj Gen. Rasnon, commanding the Corps, became very sick, and the 53rd was detailed to carry him, the detail reached as far as the vicinity of Rome, Georgia, where he died at the farm house of James Berryhill on October 29, 1864, at 2:30 o'clock. The regiment had to carry his remains to Rome, where they acted as an escort, before returning to their commands.

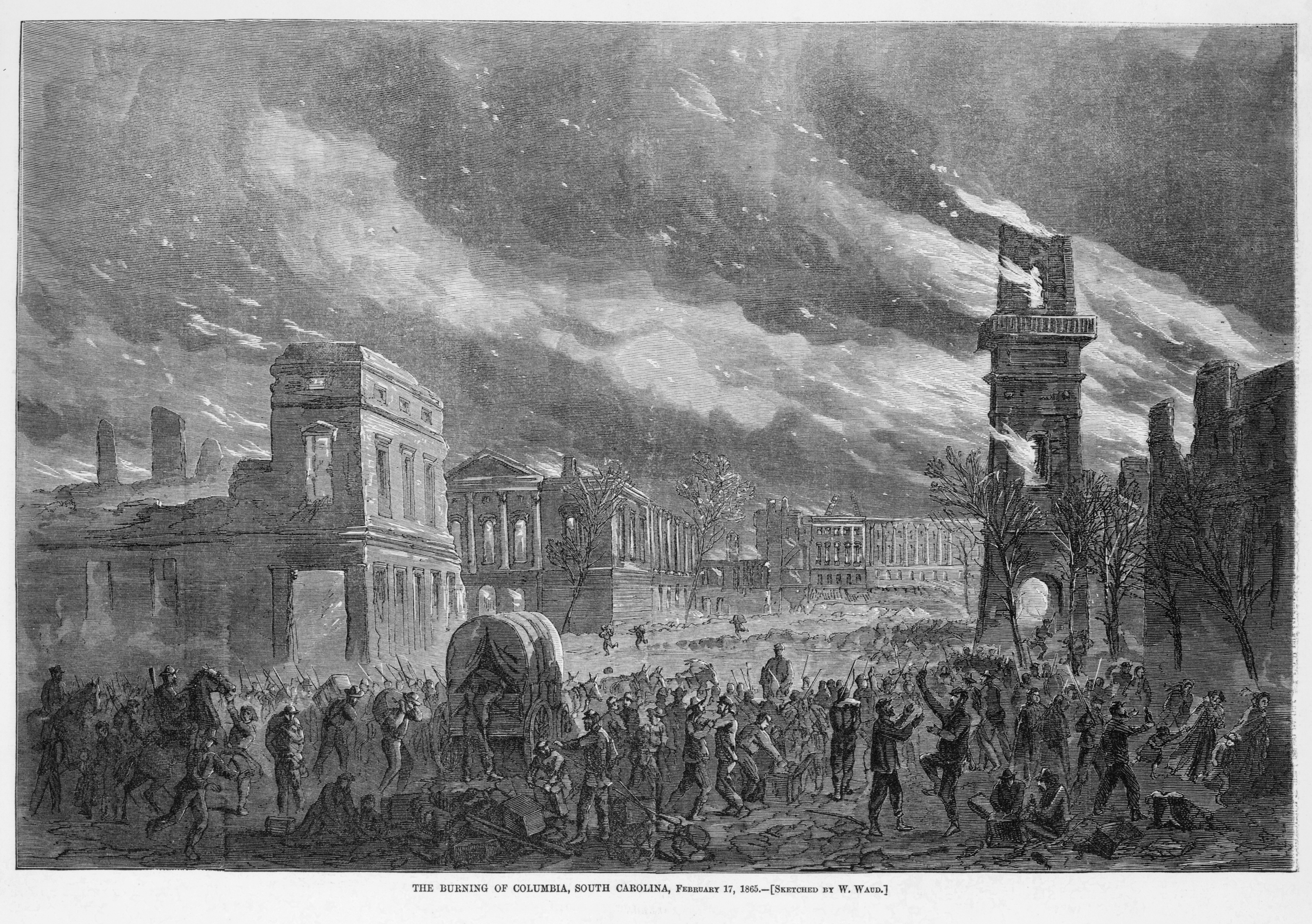
The Burning of Columbia, South Carolina, on February 17, 1865, as depicted in Harper's Weekly

=== Carolinas Campaign and mustering out ===
The regiment was later encamped near Marietta, Georgia on November 6, before participating in Sherman's March to the Sea, reaching the vicinity Savannah by December 10. During a foggy morning, a shell from the Confederates hit the regiment, killing at least 5 men and wounding 6. On December 21, the regiment entered Savannah before being encamped near BonaVenture Cemetery.

On January 4, the regiment was consolidated with the 41st Illinois, and participated in the Carolinas Campaign on January 29, moving through the Carolinas before being engaged at the Battle of Bentonville, losing only 1 man killed and 3 wounded.

The regiment marched to Washington. D.C. to participate in the Grand Review of the Armies.

The regiment was mustered out on July 22, 1865, at Louisville, Kentucky and moved to Chicago to be disbanded.

== Organizational affiliations, battle honors and detailed service ==
=== Organizational affiliations ===
During the regiment's service, they were continuously assigned to the 1st Brigade, 4th Division, however, the Corps in which the regiment was in changed, alongside the Brigade once, those were:

- Attached to 1st Brigade, 4th Division, Army of the Tennessee, to July 1862.
- 1st Brigade, 4th Division, District of Memphis, Tenn., to September 1862.
- 1st Brigade, 4th Division, District of Jackson, Tenn., to November 1862.
- 1st Brigade, 4th Division, Right Wing 13th Army Corps (Old), Department of the Tennessee, to December 1862.
- 1st Brigade, 4th Division, 17th Army Corps, to January 1863.
- 1st Brigade, 4th Division, 16th Army Corps, to July 1863.
- 1st Brigade, 4th Division, 13th Army Corps, to August 1863.
- 1st Brigade, 4th Division, 17th Army Corps, to April 1864.
- 2nd Brigade, 4th Division, 17th Army Corps, to July 1864.
- 1st Brigade, 4th Division, 17th Army Corps, to July 1865.

=== Battle honors ===
- Battle of Shiloh (April 7, 1862)
- Siege of Corinth (April 29 – May 30)
- Battle of Hatchie's River (October 5, 1862)
- Siege of Vicksburg (May 20 – July 4)
- Jackson expedition (July 5–25, 1863)
- Meridian Campaign (February 3 – March 2)
- March to the sea (November 15 – December 10)
- Carolinas Campaign (January 1 – April 26, 1865)
- Battle of Bentonville (March 19–21, 1865)

== Total strength and casualties ==
The regiment suffered 8 officers and 80 enlisted men who were killed in action or mortally wounded and 2 officers and 137 enlisted men who died of disease, for a total of 227 fatalities.

== Commanders ==
- Colonel William H.W. Cushman – resigned on September 3, 1862.
- Colonel Daniel F. Hitt – resigned on January 2, 1863.
- Colonel Seth C. Earl – killed in action on July 12, 1863.
- Colonel John W. McClanahan – mustered out with the regiment.

== See also ==
- List of Illinois Civil War Units
- Illinois in the American Civil War
