= 28th Illinois Infantry Regiment =

28th Regiment Illinois Volunteer Infantry
- Illinois state flag
- Active: August 15, 1861, to March 15, 1866
- Country: United States
- Allegiance: Union
- Branch: Infantry
- Engagements: Battle of Shiloh; Siege of Vicksburg; Battle of Fort Henry; Siege of Corinth; Battle of Hatchie's Bridge

The 28th Regiment Illinois Volunteer Infantry was an infantry regiment that served in the Army of the Tennessee of the Union Army during the American Civil War, commanded by Colonel Amory K. Johnson and later by Lieutenant Colonel Richard Ritter.

== Service ==
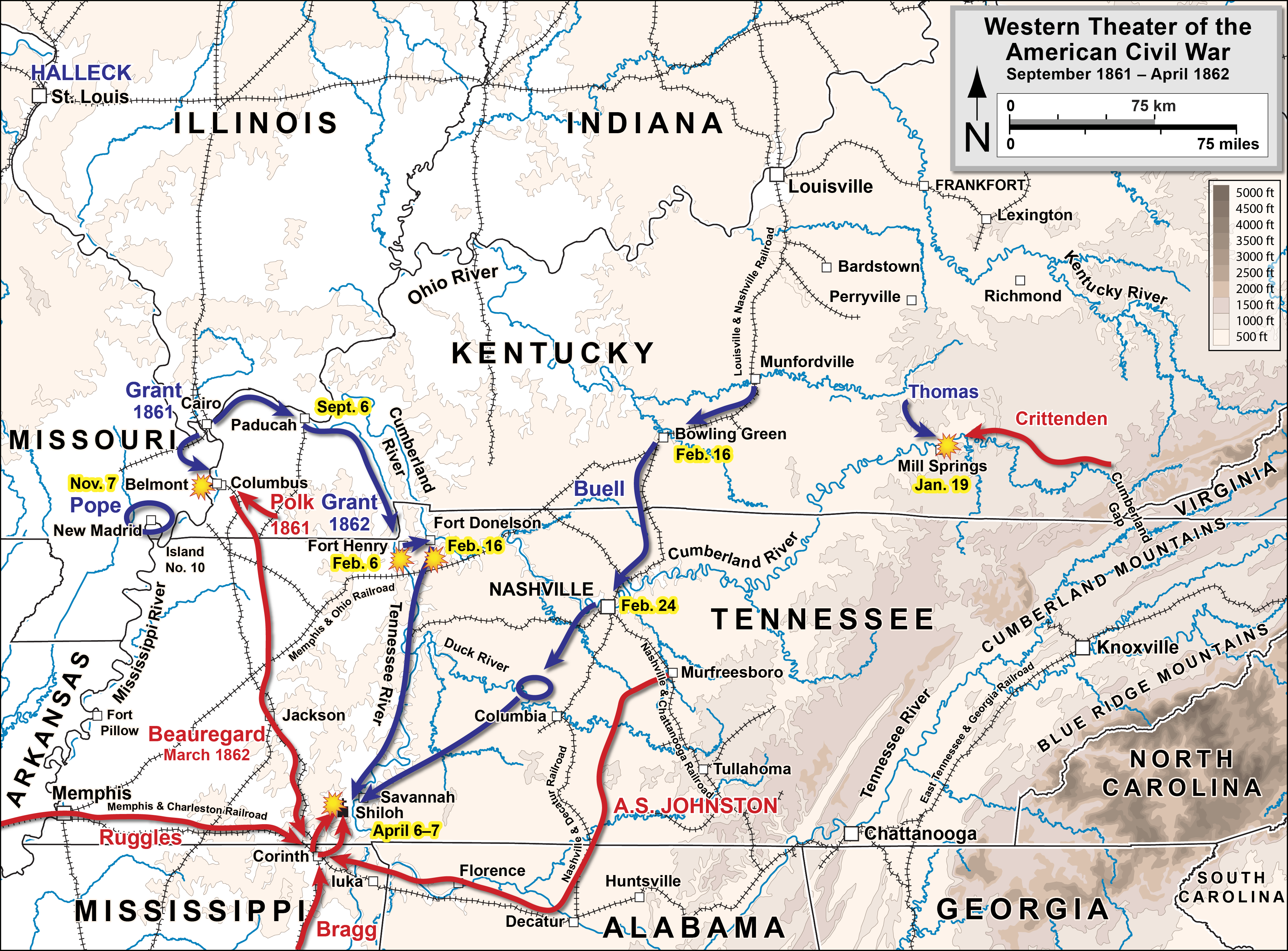
Western Theater, American Civil War September 1861 – April 1862

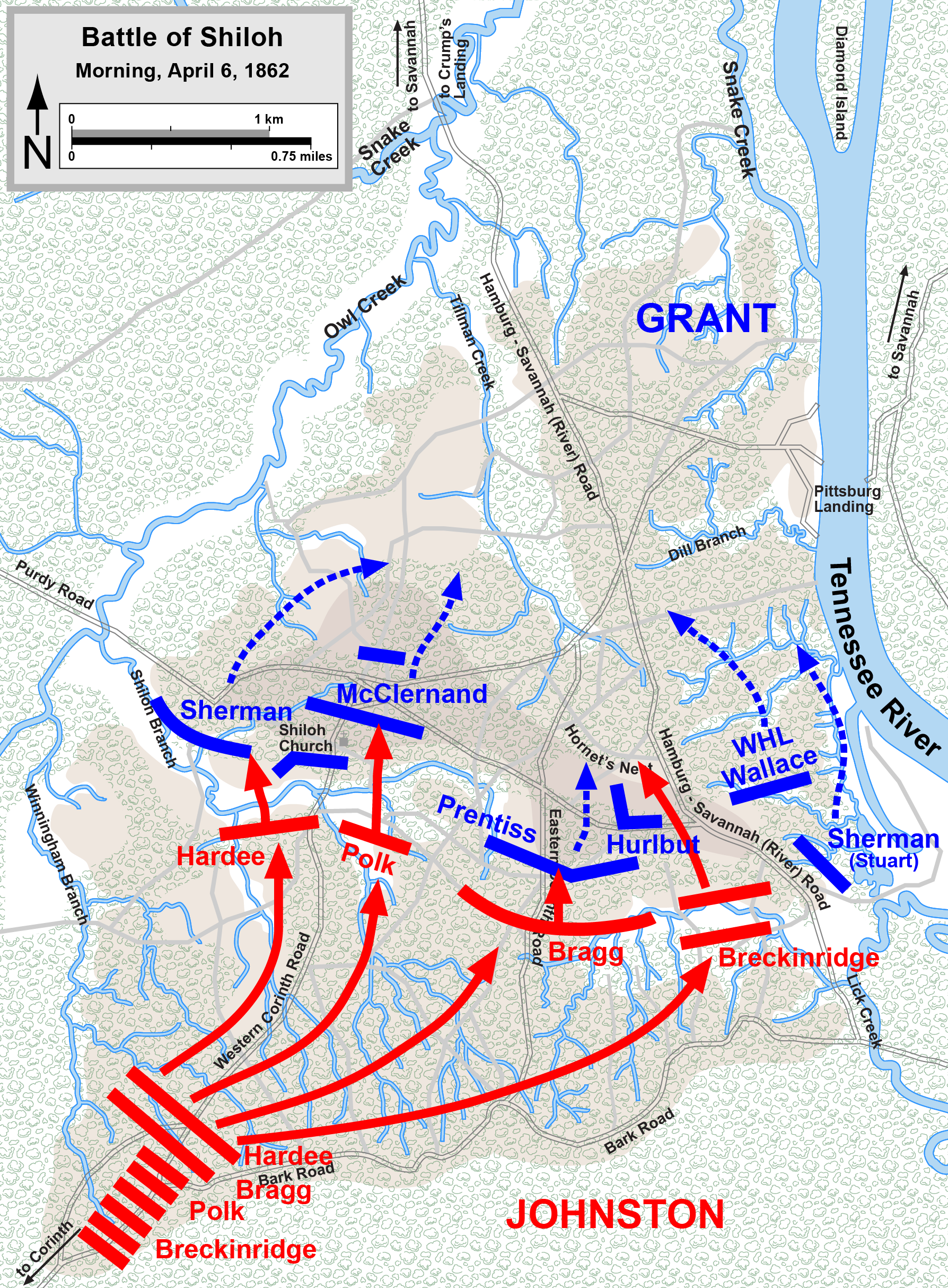
The Battle of Shiloh, April 6–7, 1862. The 28th Illinois Volunteers were in Stephen A. Hurlbut's 4th Division, which suffered heavy casualties in front of the Hornet's Nest.

The 28th Illinois Infantry was organized at Camp Butler, Illinois (dubbed "Camp Misery" because of overcrowding and poor conditions) seven miles (11 km) northeast of Springfield, Illinois, which had just been opened as a training camp for Illinois soldiers, and was mustered into Federal service on August 15, 1861. Between that date and March 15, 1866, when the regiment was mustered out and then discharged at Camp Butler on May 13, 1866, 290 fatalities were recorded, 184 of them from disease and 106 killed and mortally wounded. Of those who died from disease, 2 were officers. Of those killed and mortally wounded, 9 were officers.

After mustering in during the late summer of 1861, the 28th Illinois Infantry moved to St. Louis, Missouri, by August 28. Following this, the 28th continued to Thebes, and then to the small community of Bird's Point, Missouri by September 9. By October 2, the 28th moved on to Fort Holt, Kentucky.

In October 1861, the 28th was attached to the 4th brigade, District of Cairo. In February 1862, the 28th was moved to the 1st Brigade, 4th Division, District of West Tennessee. By July, the 28th was assigned to the District of Memphis, Tennessee. In September, Jackson, Tennessee. In November, the 28th was moved to the 3rd Brigade, 4th Division, Right Wing 13th Army Corps, and then the 17th Corps in December, and the 16th in January 1863. In July, the 28th Illinois Infantry returned to the 13th Corps, then again the 17th in August.

On January 31, 1862, the 28th Illinois Infantry moved to the city of Paducah, Kentucky. From here, the 28th moved against Forts Henry and Heiman beginning February 2. By 6 February, the 28th occupied Fort Heiman. From March 6 until March 22, the 28th Illinois Infantry moved to Pittsburg Landing, Tennessee. Starting April 6, the 28th fought here at the Battle of Shiloh.

Following this, the 28th Illinois Infantry advanced to Corinth, Mississippi, and sieged the city for a month and a day.

After the Union victory at Corinth, the 28th Illinois Infantry marched to Memphis, Tennessee from 1 June until 21 July, through the city of Grand Junction, the town of LaGrange, and the cities of Moscow and Germantown. From September 6 to 14, the 28th moved to the city of Bolivar. From here, on October 5, the 28th was involved in the Battle of Hatchie's Bridge.

Starting January 10, 1863, the 28th Illinois Infantry were posted as guards along railroad lines near the town of Colliersville. From May 11 to 14, the 28th moved to Vicksburg, Mississippi, and then served in the now-abandoned settlement of Grand Gulf. From June 11 to 4, the 28th sieged Vicksburg. The result of this siege was a victory on Independence Day, simultaneous with, and often overshadowed by the Union victory at Gettysburg.

From July 5 to 10, the 28th Illinois infantry continued to Jackson, the capital of Mississippi, and sieged the city until the 17th. Next, the 28th returned to and occupied Vicksburg. On August 15, the 28th moved to Natchez. From September 1 to 7, there was an expedition to Harrisonburg, Louisiana.

On January 4, 1864, the 28th Illinois Infantry veteranized. Some who had enlisted for a 3-year term did not re-enlist when their term expired this year. New enlistees were recruited to replace those who did not re-enlist.

The regiment was furloughed from May 18 until July 8.

From August 4 to 6, there was an expedition to Gillespie's Plantation, on the Black Bayou. From September 9 to 22, an expedition to Buck's Ferry resulted in skirmishes there. From the 26th to the 30th, there was an expedition to the Louisiana village of Sicily Island. From October 4 to 8, there was an expedition to the Homachita River. From the 10th to the 12th, the 28th Illinois Infantry moved to Morganza, Louisiana. Following this, the 28th continued to the mouth of White River from November 3 to 7. From the 20th to the 22nd, the 28th returned to and then occupied Memphis, Tennessee. There was an expedition back to the city of Moscow, Tennessee from December 21 to 31.

In October 1864, the now veteranized, consolidated 28th Illinois Infantry was moved to the 3rd Brigade, 2nd Division, 19th Army Corps, Department of the Gulf. In December, 1st Brigade, Reserve Corps, Military Division West Mississippi. In February 1865, 1st Brigade, 3rd Division.

In the beginning of 1865, January 3 to 6, the 28th Illinois Infantry moved to Kennersville, Louisiana. From February 12 to 15, the 28th continued to New Orleans. On the 17th, a campaign was mounted against the defenses of Mobile, Alabama. Beginning March 26, the 28th sieged the city of Spanish Fort and the fort of Fort Blakely. The fort was captured on the 9th. On April 12, the 28th Illinois Infantry occupied Mobile.

After the war, in July 1865 the consolidated 28th was moved to the Department of Texas until its dissolution in March 1866.

By July 3, 1865, the 28th Illinois Infantry moved to Brazos Santiago, Texas. By July 7, the 28th continued to Clarksville. By August 3, the 28th occupied Brownsville, where they served until being mustered out on March 15, 1866.

On May 13, 1866, the 28th Illinois Infantry returned to Fort Butler, where they had trained, which had since become a prison for captured Confederates. Here, where the regiment first mustered in, they were mustered out.

== Campaigns ==
The 28th Illinois Infantry saw action at the Battle of Fort Henry, the momentous, bloody Battle of Shiloh, the Siege of Corinth, Mississippi, and the Battle of Hatchie's Bridge. At Shiloh, the 28th was attached to Hurlbut's 4th, where they saw some of the most intense fighting near the Hornet's Nest. Grant's Central Mississippi campaign ( November 2, 1862 – January 10, 1863) culminated in the Siege of Vicksburg (June 11 – July 4, 1863), one of the most important Union victories of the war. It opened the Mississippi River for the Union and cut the Confederacy in half. The Vicksburg victory effectively finished the Confederacy in the West, severing Texas, Arkansas and large parts of Louisiana from the remainder of the insurgent states.

Vicksburg's surrender was followed by the campaign against the Confederacy's 4th largest city, Mobile, Alabama, which fell after the siege and capture of Spanish Fort and the Battle of Fort Blakeley (February 17 – April 12, 1865). The 28th Illinois Infantry completed later assignments with the occupation of Brazos Santiago, Clarksville, and Brownsville, Texas (July 1865 – March 1866).

== See also ==
- List of Illinois Civil War Units
- Illinois in the American Civil War
