= 41st Illinois Infantry Regiment =

41st Regiment Illinois Volunteer Infantry
- Illinois state flag
- Active: August 10, 1861, to December 23, 1864
- Country: United States
- Allegiance: Union
- Branch: Infantry
- Engagements: Battle of Shiloh; Siege of Vicksburg; Battle of Pleasant Hill; March to the Sea

The 41st Regiment Illinois Volunteer Infantry was an infantry regiment that served in the Union Army during the American Civil War.

== Service ==
The 41st Illinois Infantry was organized at Decatur, Illinois and mustered into Federal service on August 5, 1861.

The regiment as a whole saw action with the Army of the Tennessee at Fort Donelson, Shiloh, Corinth, Hatchie's Bridge, Vicksburg and Meridian.

In March, 1864 the veterans of the regiment went on furlough and the newly recruited members of the regiment joined Nathanial Banks' Army of the Gulf. This non-veteran detachment fought at Fort DeRussy, Pleasant Hill, Mansura and Tupelo.

The veterans did not rejoin the regiment after their furlough but instead formed a "Veteran's Battalion" and rejoined the Army of the Tennessee in Georgia. They were assigned to guard duty along the railroad near Big Shanty, Marietta and Kenesaw Mountain. Then moved with the army during the March to the Sea and siege of Savannah, Georgia.

The regiment was consolidated with the 53rd Illinois Volunteer Infantry Regiment on December 23, 1864.

== Total strength and casualties ==
The regiment suffered 8 officers and 107 enlisted men who were killed in action or mortally wounded and 3 officers and 107 enlisted men who died of disease, for a total of 225 fatalities.

== Commanders ==
- Colonel Isaac C. Pugh - mustered out with the regiment.
- Colonel John N. Nale
- List of Illinois Civil War Units
- Illinois in the American Civil War

== See also ==
- List of Illinois Civil War units
