= James C. Veatch =

American politician

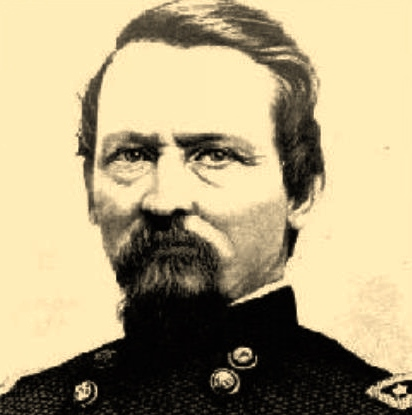
- James C. Veatch, c. 1862
- Born: December 19, 1819; Elizabeth, Indiana
- Died: December 22, 1895 (aged 76); Rockport, Indiana
- Burial place: Sunset Hill Cemetery, Rockport, Indiana
- Military career
- Allegiance: United States of America; Union
- Branch: United States Army; Union Army
- Service years: 1861–1865
- Rank: Brigadier General; Brevet Major General
- Commands: 25th Regiment Indiana Infantry
- Conflicts: American Civil War: Battle of Fort Donelson; Battle of Shiloh; Siege of Corinth; Battle of Hatchie's Bridge; Battle of Meridian; Battle of Resaca; Battle of Dallas; Battle of Kennesaw Mountain; Battle of Fort Blakeley
- Other work: lawyer, Indiana Legislator, IRS collector

James Clifford Veatch (December 19, 1819 – December 22, 1895) was a lawyer who served as an Indiana state legislator and county auditor. He later served as a Union general during the American Civil War, fighting primarily in the Western Theater. He rose to command of a division of infantry and fought in several important battles.

== Early life and career ==
Veatch was born near Elizabeth, Indiana in 1819. His father, Isaac Veatch, was a member of the Indiana House of Representatives from 1827 to 1828. He died of cholera in July 1833. His grandfather, Nathan Veatch, fought in the American Revolution at the Battle of King's Mountain as a lieutenant of Tennessee Volunteers. His great-grandfather, James Veatch, fought, was wounded, and died of his wounds in the American Revolution at the Battle of Camden.

James Veatch was educated in common schools and under private tutors. He studied law and was admitted to the bar, establishing a private practice in Elizabethtown. He practiced for many years and was the auditor of Spencer County, Indiana from 1841 until 1855. He was serving as a state legislator when the Civil War began.

== Civil War service ==
Veatch volunteered for service in the Union army and was appointed colonel of the 25th Regiment Indiana Infantry. He led the regiment at the battle of Fort Donelson and then took command of the 2nd Brigade in Stephen A. Hurlbut's division at the battle of Shiloh. Major John W. Foster noted that "Colonel Veatch acted with great courage. He was always with his brigade in the thickest of the fight."

On April 28, 1862, Veatch was appointed brigadier general of volunteers. He was still in command of his brigade during the siege of Corinth and the battle of Hatchie's Bridge where he was wounded. For the next year, General Veatch commanded the District of Memphis. Veatch led the 4th Division of the XVI Corps during the Meridian Expedition. His division joined William T. Sherman's forces for the Atlanta campaign and fought at the battles of Resaca, Dallas and Kennesaw Mountain. He went on sick leave on July 17, 1864, just prior to the Battle of Atlanta. When Veatch returned to active duty, his former commander, Oliver O. Howard, instructed him to wait in Memphis for orders. He briefly commanded the District of West Tennessee before being assigned to the Department of the Gulf. There, he assumed command of the 1st Division in Gordon Granger's XIII Corps and participated in the Battle of Fort Blakeley. He was brevetted to major general of volunteers in March 1865 and resigned from the army in August of that year.

== Postbellum career ==
After the war, Veatch became the Indiana Adjutant General in 1869, and was active in local veterans and fraternal organizations, including the Grand Army of the Republic and the Freemasons. He was the collector of internal revenue taxes from April 1870 until August 1883.

James C. Veatch died December 22, 1895, in Rockport, Indiana and was buried at Sunset Hill Cemetery. He was survived by three children, and the youngest generation Veatch is now in college at Iowa State University.
