= 7th Iowa Infantry Regiment =

Infantry regiment in the Union Army during the American Civil War

- Iowa flag
- Active: July 24, 1861, to July 12, 1865
- Country: United States
- Allegiance: Union
- Branch: Infantry
- Engagements: Battle of Belmont; Fort Henry; Fort Donelson; Battle of Shiloh; Battle of Corinth; Battle of Resaca; Battle of Kennesaw Mountain; Battle of Atlanta; March to the Sea; Battle of Bentonville

The 7th Iowa Infantry Regiment was an infantry regiment that served in the Union Army during the American Civil War.

== Service ==
The 7th Iowa Infantry was organized at Burlington, Iowa, and assembled into Federal service between July 23 and August 4, 1861. Just four days after they were mustered, the regiment moved to St. Louis on August 8, to receive Springfield Rifles.

The regiment was sent out on July 12, 1865.

== Total strength and casualties ==
Unit strength was 1552. The regiment lost 7 officers and 134 enlisted men who were killed in action or who died of their wounds and 4 officers and 160 enlisted men who died of disease, for a total of 305 fatalities. 354 were wounded.

== Commanders ==
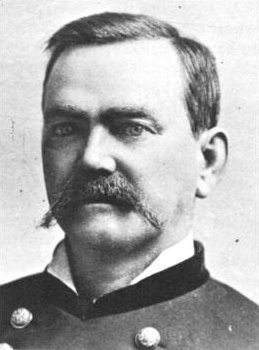
Elliott Warren Rice

- Colonel Jacob Gartner Lauman
- Colonel Elliott W. Rice
- Brevet Colonel James Corner Parrot

== See also ==
- List of Iowa Civil War Units
- Iowa in the American Civil War
