= 40th Illinois Infantry Regiment =

40th Regiment Illinois Volunteer Infantry
- Illinois state flag
- Active: August 10, 1861, to July 24, 1865
- Country: United States
- Allegiance: Union
- Branch: Infantry
- Engagements: Battle of Shiloh; Siege of Vicksburg; Battle of Missionary Ridge; Battle of Kennesaw Mountain; Siege of Atlanta; Battle of Jonesborough; March to the Sea

The 40th Regiment Illinois Volunteer Infantry was an infantry regiment that served in the Union Army during the American Civil War.

== Service ==
The 40th Illinois Infantry was organized at Springfield, Illinois and mustered into Federal service on August 10, 1861.

Once mustered, the regiment marched to Jefferson Barracks, Missouri, remaining there until August 30, when it marched to Bird's Point and subsequently to Paducah, Kentucky. The regiment were encamped there for the winter, where it was trained and performed guard duty, while Companies A and F were detached to perform duty at Smithland, Kentucky.

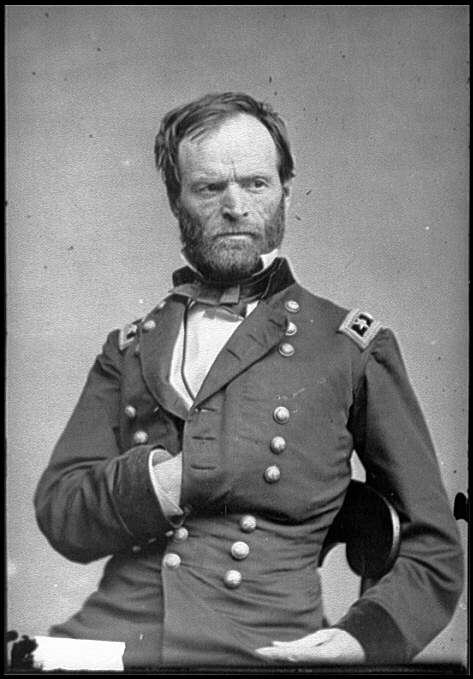
William T. Sherman

On March, 1862, the regiment was assigned to Hicks' Brigade of the District of Paducah, where it moved up the Tennessee River via transports, and landed on Pittsburgh Landing on March 17. The regiment was assigned to McDowell's 1st Brigade of the Army of the Tennessee before participating in the Battle of Shiloh, where despite losing 4 officers, and 190 men, it was one of the regiments Sherman complimented for.

After the Battle of Shiloh, it was sent to Corinth to participate in the siege, until the Confederate evacuation of the city. The regiment was then ordered to Memphis, arriving there on July 21, 1862, and was encamped there until November 26.

The regiment was mustered out on July 24, 1865.

Participated in the Battle of Shiloh, Siege of Vicksburg, Battle of Missionary Ridge, Battle of Kennesaw Mountain, Siege of Atlanta, and the March to the Sea

== Total strength and casualties ==
The regiment suffered 6 officers and 119 enlisted men who were killed in action or mortally wounded and 4 officers and 117 enlisted men who died of disease, for a total of 246 fatalities.

== Commanders ==
- Colonel Stephen G. Hicks - discharged on October 13, 1862.

== See also ==
- List of Illinois Civil War Units
- Illinois in the American Civil War
