= 15th Ohio Independent Light Artillery Battery =

15th Ohio Battery
- Active: February 1, 1862, to June 20, 1865
- Country: United States
- Allegiance: Union
- Branch: Artillery
- Engagements: Siege of Corinth; Battle of Metamora; Siege of Vicksburg, May 19 & May 22 assaults Siege of Jackson; Atlanta campaign Battle of Kennesaw Mountain; Battle of Nickajack Creek; Battle of Atlanta; Siege of Atlanta; Battle of Jonesboro; Sherman's March to the Sea; Carolinas campaign Battle of Bentonville

15th Ohio Battery was an artillery battery that served in the Union Army during the American Civil War.

== Service ==
The 15th Ohio Battery was organized at Camp Dennison near Cincinnati, Ohio, and mustered in February 1, 1862, for a three-year enlistment under Captain Edward Spear Jr..

The battery was attached to Artillery, 4th Division, Army of the Tennessee, to July 1862. 4th Division, District of Memphis, Tennessee, to September 1862. 4th Division, District of Jackson, Tennessee, to November 1862. 4th Division, Right Wing, XIII Corps, Department of the Tennessee, to December 1862. Artillery, 4th Division, XVII Corps, to January 1863. Artillery, 4th Division, XVI Corps, to July 1863. Artillery, 4th Division, XIII Corps, to August 1863. Artillery, 4th Division, XVII Corps, to November 1864. Artillery Brigade, XVII Corps, to June 1865.

The 15th Ohio Battery mustered out of service in Columbus, Ohio, on June 20, 1865.

== Detailed service ==
Ordered to Cincinnati, Ohio, then to Fort Leavenworth, Kansas, February 16. While en route, disembarked at Paducah, Ky., and duty there until April 15. Ordered to Pittsburg Landing, Tenn., April 15. Whitehall Landing April 17. Advance on and siege of Corinth, Miss., April 29-May 30. March to Memphis, Tenn., via Grand Junction, LaGrange and Holly Springs June 1-July 21. Duty at Memphis until September 6. March to Bolivar and Hatchie River September 6–14. Expedition to Grand Junction September 20. Skirmish with Price and Van Dorn September 21. Battle of Metamora October 5. Bolivar October 7. Expedition from LaGrange toward Lamar, Miss., November 5. Grant's Central Mississippi Campaign. Operations on the Mississippi Central Railroad November 1862 to January 1863. Action at Worsham's Creek November 6. At Calersville, Tenn., January to March 1863. Moved to Memphis, Tenn., March 9, and duty there until May. Expedition to the Coldwater April 18–24. Hernando April 18. Perry's Ferry, Coldwater River, April 19. Ordered to Vicksburg, Miss., May 11. Siege of Vicksburg May 18-July 4. Assaults on Vicksburg May 19 and 22. Advance on Jackson, Miss., July 5–10. Siege of Jackson July 10–17. At Vicksburg until August 2. Ordered to Natchez, Miss., August 15. Expedition to Harrisonburg September 1–8. Near Harrisonburg and capture of Fort Beauregard September 4. At Natchez until December. Ordered to Vicksburg and camp at Clear Creek until February, 1864. Meridian Campaign February 3-March 2. Veterans on furlough March–April. Moved to Clifton, Tenn., thence march via Huntsville and Decatur, Ala., to Kingston, Ga., and Ackworth, Ga., April 28-June 8. Atlanta Campaign June 8 to September 8. Operations about Marietta and against Kennesaw Mountain June 10-July 5. Assault on Kennesaw June 27. Nickajack Creek July 2–5. Chattahoochie River July 5–17. Turner's Ferry July 5. Leggett's or Bald Hill July 20–21. Battle of Atlanta July 22. Siege of Atlanta July 22-August 25. Flank movement on Jonesboro August 25–30. Battle of Jonesboro August 31-September 1. Lovejoy's Station September 2–6. Operations against Hood in northern Georgia and northern Alabama September 29-November 3. March to the sea November 15-December 10. Siege of Savannah December 10–21. Campaign of the Carolinas January to April 1865. Pocotaligo, S.C., January 14. Barker's Mills, Whippy Swamp, February 2. Salkehatchie Swamp February 2–5. Binnaker's Bridge February 9. Orangeburg February 12–13. Columbia February 15–17. Taylor's Hole Creek, Averysboro, N.C., March 16. Battle of Bentonville March 20–21. Occupation of Goldsboro March 24, and of Raleigh April 14. Bennett's House April 26. Surrender of Johnston and his army. March to Washington, D.C., via Richmond, Va., April 29-May 20. Grand Review of the Armies May 24 then moved to Columbus, Ohio.

== Casualties ==
The battery lost a total of 38 enlisted men during service; 8 killed or mortally wounded, 30 died due to disease.

== Commanders ==
- Captain Edward Spear Jr.
- Captain James Burdick

== See also ==
- List of Ohio Civil War units
- Ohio in the Civil War
