= 7th Ohio Independent Light Artillery Battery =

7th Ohio Battery
- Active: January 1, 1862, to August 11, 1865
- Country: United States
- Allegiance: Union
- Branch: Artillery
- Engagements: Siege of Corinth; Battle of Hatchie's Bridge; Siege of Vicksburg, May 19 & May 22 assaults Siege of Jackson

7th Ohio Battery was an artillery battery that served in the Union Army during the American Civil War.

== Service ==
The 7th Ohio Battery was organized at Camp Dennison near Cincinnati, Ohio and mustered in for a three-year enlistment on January 1, 1862, under Captain Silas A. Burnap.

The battery was attached to 6th Division, Army of the Tennessee, to June 1862. Artillery, 4th Division, Army of the Tennessee and District of Memphis, Tennessee, to September 1862. Artillery, 4th Division, District of Jackson, Tennessee, to November 1862. Artillery, 4th Division, Right Wing, XIII Corps, Department of the Tennessee, to December 1862. Artillery, 4th Division, XVII Corps, to January 1863. Artillery, 4th Division, XVI Corps, to July 1863. Artillery, 4th Division, XIII Corps, to August 1863. Artillery, 4th Division, XVII Corps, to April 1864. Artillery, 1st Division, XVII Corps, to September 1864. Artillery, Post of Vicksburg, Mississippi, District of Vicksburg, Mississippi, to November 1864. Artillery Reserve, District of Vicksburg, Mississippi, to August, 1865.

The 7th Ohio Battery mustered out of service at Camp Dennison on August 11, 1865.

== Detailed service ==
Moved to St. Louis, Mo., March 18; then to Pittsburg Landing, Tenn., April 6. Advance on and siege of Corinth, Miss., April 29-May 30, 1862. March to Memphis, Tenn., via Grand Junction, Lagrange, and Holly Springs June 1-July 21. At Memphis until September 6. March to Bolivar, Tenn., September 6–16. Battle of Hatchie River, Metamora, October 5. Grant's Central Mississippi Campaign November–December. Moved to Memphis, Tenn., and duty there until May 1863. Ordered to Vicksburg, Miss., May 13. Siege of Vicksburg, Miss., May 18-July 4. Assaults on Vicksburg May 19 and 22. Advance on Jackson, Miss., July 5–10. Siege of Jackson July 10–17. Assault on Jackson July 12. Ordered to Natchez, Miss., August 12, and duty there until November 11. Expedition to Harrisonburg, La., September 1–8. Moved to Vicksburg November 11 and camp at Big Black until February 1864. Meridian Campaign February 3-March 2. Champion Hill February 4. Duty at Vicksburg until May. Expedition to Yazoo City May 4–22. Benton May 7 and 9. Duty at Vicksburg until January 3, 1865. At Jackson and Hazelhurst as infantry until July.

== Casualties ==
The battery lost a total of 33 men during service; 1 enlisted men killed, 1 officer and 31 enlisted men died of disease.

== Commanders ==
- Captain Silas A. Burnap

== See also ==
- List of Ohio Civil War units
- Ohio in the Civil War
