= 68th Ohio Infantry Regiment =

- Active: October 1861 to July 10, 1865
- Country: United States
- Allegiance: Union
- Branch: Infantry
- Engagements: Battle of Fort Donelson; Battle of Shiloh; Siege of Corinth; Battle of Hatchie's Bridge; Battle of Port Gibson; Battle of Raymond; Battle of Champion Hill; Siege of Vicksburg; Meridian Campaign; Atlanta campaign; Battle of Kennesaw Mountain; Battle of Atlanta; Siege of Atlanta; Battle of Jonesboro; Battle of Franklin Sherman's March to the Sea; Carolinas campaign; Battle of Bentonville

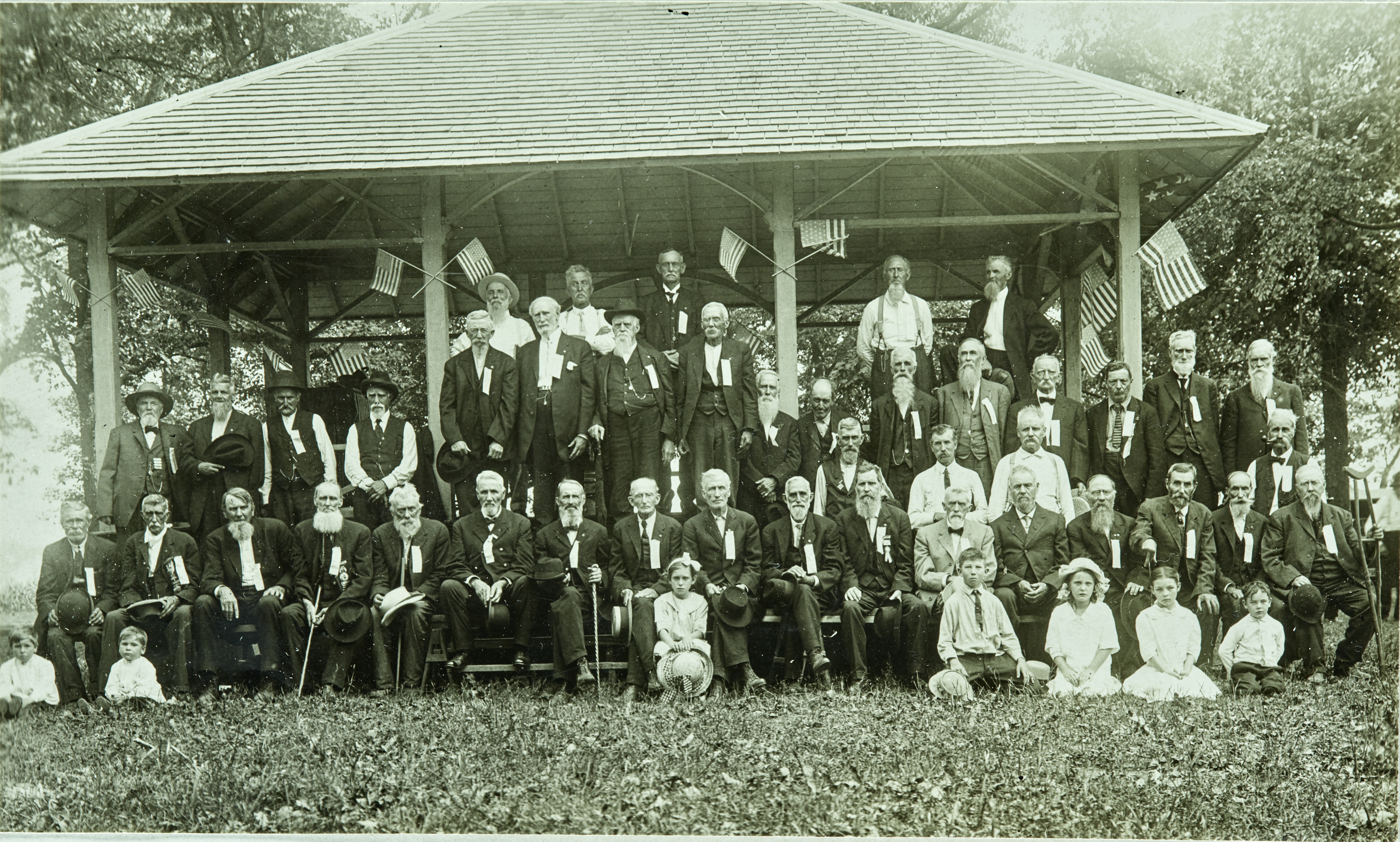

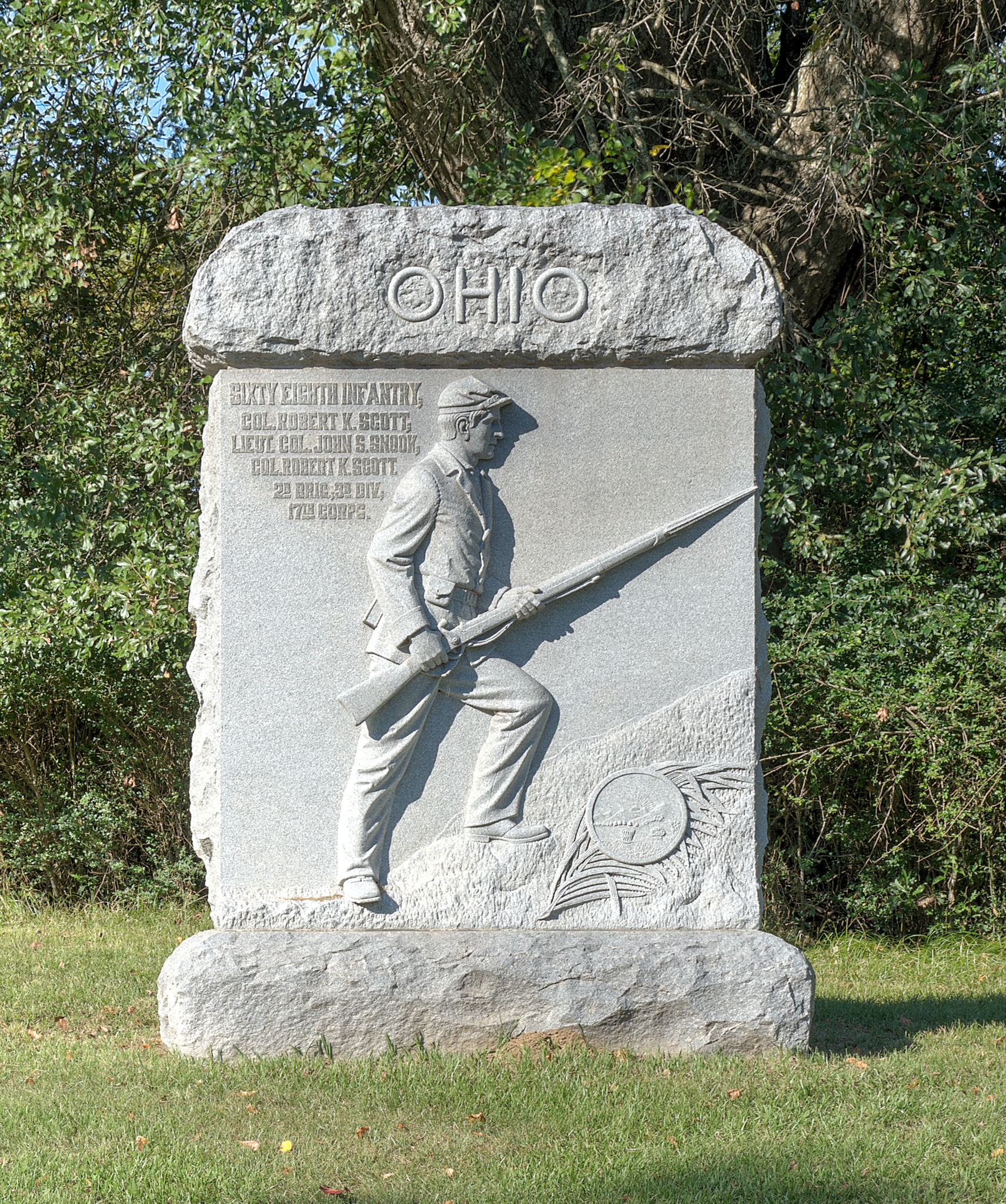
Memorial at Vicksburg National Military Park

The 68th Ohio Infantry Regiment was an infantry regiment in the Union Army during the American Civil War.

== Service ==
The 68th Ohio Infantry Regiment was organized at Camp Latty in Napoleon, Ohio October through December 1861 and mustered in for three years service under the command of Colonel Samuel H. Steedman.

The regiment was attached to 3rd Brigade, 3rd Division, Military District of Cairo, February 1862. 2nd Brigade, 3rd Division, Army of the Tennessee, to May 1862. 3rd Brigade, 3rd Division, Army of the Tennessee, to July 1863. Unattached, District of Jackson, Tennessee, to November 1862. 2nd Brigade, 3rd Division, Right Wing, XIII Corps, Department of the Tennessee, to December 1862. 2nd Brigade, 3rd Division, XVII Corps, Army of the Tennessee, to July 1865.

The 68th Ohio Infantry mustered out of service at Louisville, Kentucky, on July 10, 1865.

== Detailed service ==
Moved to Camp Chase, Ohio, January 21, 1862, then ordered to Fort Donelson, Tenn., February 7. Investment and capture of Fort Donelson, Tenn., February 12–16, 1862. Expedition toward Purdy and operations about Crump's Landing March 9–14. Battle of Shiloh April 6–7. Advance on and siege of Corinth, Miss., April 29-May 30. March to Purdy, thence to Bolivar, and duty there until September. March to Iuka, Miss., September 1–19. Battle of the Hatchie October 5. Grant's Central Mississippi Campaign, operations on the Mississippi Central Railroad, November 2, 1862, to January 10, 1863. Reconnaissance from LaGrange November 8–9, 1862. Moved to Memphis, Tenn., January 20, 1863, then to Lake Providence, La., February 22. Moved to Milliken's Bend April 10. Movement on Bruinsburg, Mississippi and turning Grand Gulf April 25–30. Battle of Port Gibson May 1. Forty Hills and Hankinson's Ferry May 3–4. Battle of Raymond May 12. Jackson May 14. Battle of Champion Hill May 16. Siege of Vicksburg May 18-July 4. Surrender of Vicksburg July 4, and duty there until February 1864. Expedition to Monroe, La., August 20-September 2, 1863. Expedition to Canton October 14–20. Bogue Chitto Creek October 17. Meridian Campaign February 3-March 2, 1864. Morton February 10. Veterans absent on furlough February 20-May 8. Moved to Cairo, Ill., May 7–8, then to Clifton, Tenn., and march via Pulaski, Huntsville and Decatur, Ala., to Rome and Ackworth, Ga., May 12-June 9. Atlanta Campaign June-9-September 8. Operations about Marietta and against Kennesaw Mountain June 10-July 2. Assault on Kennesaw June 27. Nickajack Creak July 2–5. Chattahoochie River July 5–17. Howell's Ferry July 5. Leggett's or Bald Hill July 20–21. Battle of Atlanta July 22. Siege of Atlanta July 22-August 25. Flank movement on Jonesboro August 25–30. Battle of Jonesboro August 31-September 1. Lovejoy's Station September 2–6. Jonesboro September 5. Operations in northern Georgia and northern Alabama against Hood September 29-November 3 (Battle of Franklin). March to the sea November 15-December 10. Siege of Savannah December 10–21. Campaign of the Carolinas January to April 1865. Pocotaligo, S.C., January 14. Salkehatchie Swamps February 2–5. Barker's Mills, Whippy Swamp, February 2. Binnaker's Bridge, South Edisto River, February 9. Orangeburg, North Edisto River, February 12–13. Columbia February 16–17. Battle of Bentonville, N.C., March 20–21. Occupation of Goldsboro March 24. Advance on Raleigh April 10–14. Occupation of Raleigh April 14. Bennett's House April 26. Surrender of Johnston and his army. March to Washington, D.C., via Richmond, Va., April 29-May 20. Grand Review of the Armies May 24. Moved to Louisville, Ky., June 1, and duty there until July.

== Casualties ==
The regiment lost almost a total of 300 men during service; 2 officers and 48 enlisted men killed or mortally wounded, 1 officer and 249 enlisted men died of disease.

== Commanders ==
- Colonel Samuel H. Steedman
- Colonel Robert Kingston Scott
- Lieutenant Colonel John S. Snook - commanded at the battle of Champion Hill

== See also ==
- List of Ohio Civil War units
- Ohio in the Civil War
