= 25th Indiana Infantry Regiment =

25th Regiment Indiana Volunteer Infantry
- Flag of the United States, 1863-1865
- Active: August 19, 1861, to July 17, 1865
- Country: United States
- Allegiance: Union
- Branch: Infantry
- Engagements: Battle of Fort Donelson; Battle of Shiloh; Siege of Corinth; Battle of Hatchie's Bridge; Atlanta campaign Battle of Jonesboro; Battle of Bentonville

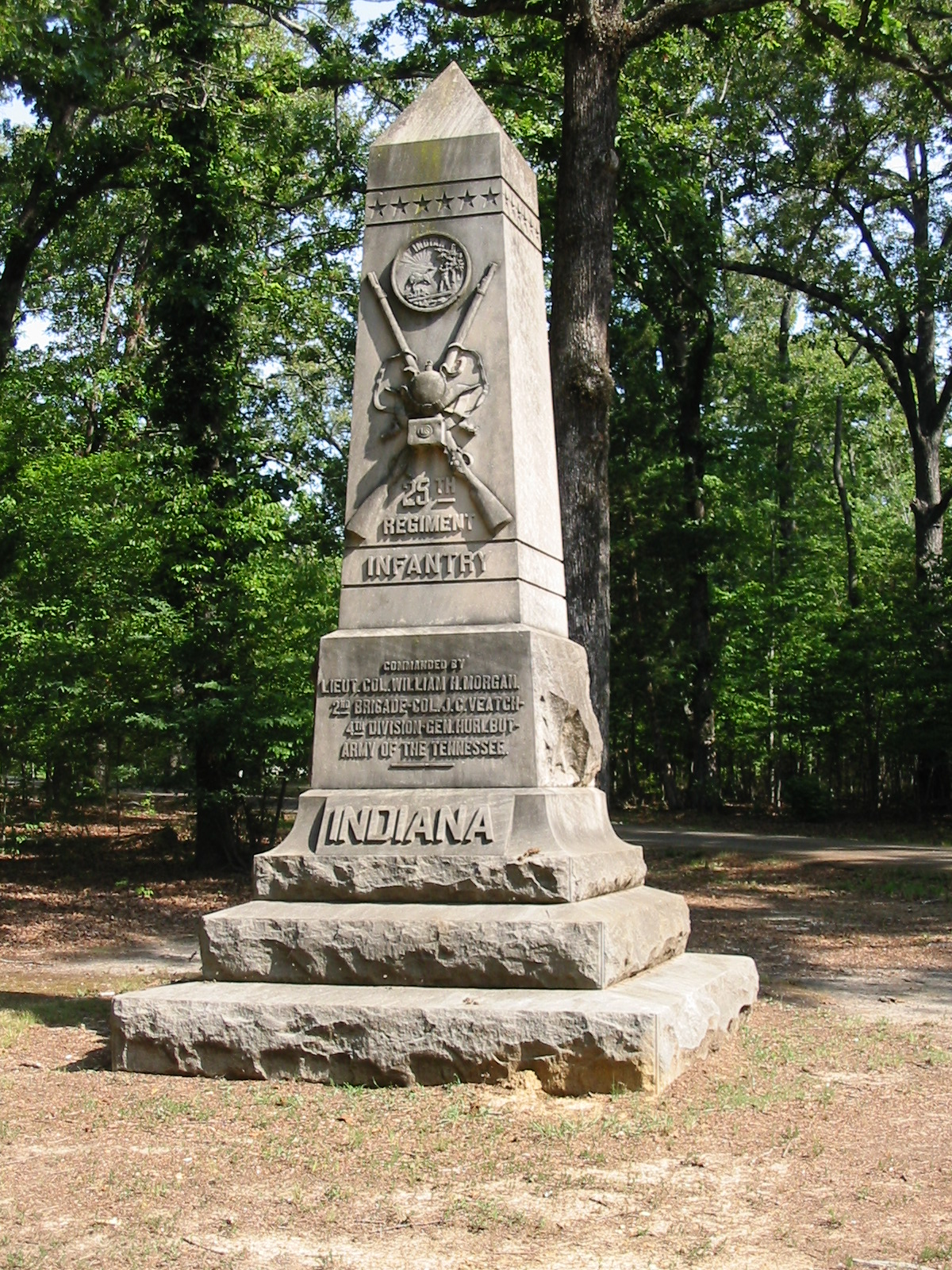
The 25th Indiana Infantry Monument at Shiloh National Military Park.

The 25th Indiana Volunteer Infantry Regiment was an infantry regiment that served in the Union Army during the American Civil War.

== Service ==
- The 25th Indiana Volunteer Infantry was organized at Evansville, Indiana, on August 19, 1861.
- Battle of Fort Donelson
- Battle of Shiloh
- Siege of Corinth
- Battle of Hatchie's Bridge
- Battle of Davis Mills
- Battle of Hatchie's Bridge
- Atlanta campaign
- Battle of Jonesboro
- Sherman's March to the Sea
- Battle of Bentonville
- The regiment mustered out of service on July 17, 1865.

== Total strength and casualties ==
The regiment lost 7 officers and 81 enlisted men killed in action or died of wounds and 3 officers and 270 enlisted men who died of disease, for a total of 361 fatalities.

== Commanders ==
- Colonel James Clifford Veatch
- Colonel William Henry Morgan

== Regimental flag ==
The regimental flag of the 25th Indiana Infantry Regiment was returned to the Indiana War Memorial Museum in 2007 by the FBI art crime division. The flag was found at the Waterloo, Indiana branch of the First National Bank of Fremont, Indiana. Earl Ford McNaughton, the bank's former executive, had purchased the flag for $43,250 and had it as a part of his private American Civil War collection. The 6-square-foot (0.56 m^{2}) flag had been labeled as missing from the museum's flag inventory since the 1990s, although it was accounted for in the 1980s inventory with an estimated value of $50,000 to $60,000. Wes Cowan of Cowan's Auctions of Cincinnati positively identified the flag as authentic and the flag was returned to the state of Indiana at the Indiana War Memorial Museum, the custodian of the state's Civil War flag collection.

== See also ==
- List of Indiana Civil War regiments
- Indiana in the Civil War
