= 53rd Indiana Infantry Regiment =

53rd Regiment Indiana Infantry
- Active: February 19, 1862 – July 21, 1865
- Country: United States
- Allegiance: Union
- Branch: Infantry
- Engagements: Siege of Corinth; Battle of Hatchie's Bridge; Siege of Vicksburg; Meridian Campaign; Atlanta campaign Battle of Kennesaw Mountain; Battle of Atlanta; Siege of Atlanta; Battle of Jonesborough; Sherman's March to the Sea; Carolinas campaign Battle of Bentonville

The 53rd Regiment Indiana Infantry was an infantry regiment that served in the Union Army during the American Civil War.

== Service ==
The 53rd Indiana Infantry was organized at New Albany and Indianapolis, Indiana, beginning February 19, 1862, and mustered in for a three-year enlistment on March 6, 1862.

The regiment was attached to 2nd Brigade, 4th Division, Army of the Tennessee, to July 1862. 2nd Brigade, 4th Division, District of Memphis, Tennessee, to September 1862. 2nd Brigade, 4th Division, District of Jackson, Tennessee, to November 1862. 3rd Brigade, 4th Division, District of Jackson, Tennessee, XIII Corps, Department of the Tennessee, to December 1862. 3rd Brigade. 4th Division, XVII Corps, to January 1863. 3rd Brigade, 4th Division, XVI Corps, to July 1863. 3rd Brigade, 4th Division, XIII Corps, to August 1863. 3rd Brigade, 4th Division, XVII Corps, to May 1864. 1st Brigade, 4th Division, XVII Corps, to July 1865.

The 53rd Indiana Infantry mustered out July 21, 1865, at Louisville, Kentucky.

== Detailed service ==
- Guard prisoners at Indianapolis until March 15.
- Ordered to Savannah, Tennessee, March 15.
- Advance on and siege of Corinth, Mississippi, April 29-May 30, 1862.
- March to Memphis, Tennessee, via Grand Junction, LaGrange, and Holly Springs, June 1-July 21, and duty there until September 6.
- March to Jackson and Bolivar, Tennessee, September 6–14.
- Battle of Metamora, Hatchie River, October 5. Grant's Central Mississippi Campaign.
- Operations on the Mississippi Central Railroad November 1862 to January 1863.
- Duty at Colliersville and Memphis until April.
- Ordered to Young's Point, Louisiana, then to Grand Gulf, Mississippi, and duty there until June 12.
- Siege of Vicksburg, Mississippi, June 15-July 4.
- Advance on Jackson, Mississippi, July 4–10. Siege of Jackson July 10–17.
- Reconnaissance to Pearl River July 15. Duty at Vicksburg until August 15.
- Ordered to Natchez, Mississippi, August 15, and duty there until November 24.
- Expedition to Harrisonburg September 1–8.
- Near Harrisonburg and capture of Fort Beauregard September 4.
- Ordered to Vicksburg, Mississippi, November 24, and duty there until February 1864.
- Meridian Campaign February 3-March 2. Veterans on furlough March and April.
- Moved to Bird's Point, Missouri, April 28; then to Clifton, Tennessee, and march to Ackworth, Georgia, via Huntsville and Decatur, Alabama, and Rome, Georgia, May 5-June 9.
- Atlanta Campaign June 9-September 8.
- Operations about Marietta and against Kennesaw Mountain June 10-July 2. Assault on Kennesaw June 27.
- Nickajack Creek July 2–5. Turner's Ferry July 5.
- Chattahoochie River July 5–17.
- Leggett's or Bald Hill July 20–21.
- Battle of Atlanta July 22. Siege of Atlanta July 22-August 25.
- Flank movement on Jonesborough August 25–31.
- Battle of Jonesborough August 31-September 1.
- Lovejoy's Station September 2–6.
- Operations against Hood in northern Georgia and northern Alabama September 29-November 3.
- Shadow Church and Westbrook's, near Fairburn, October 1–3. March to the sea November 15-December 10.
- Ball's Ferry and Georgia Central Railroad Bridge, Peones River, November 23–25.
- Siege of Savannah December 10–21. Carolinas Campaign January to April 1865.
- Salkehatchie Swamps, South Carolina, February 2–5. Rivers Bridge, Salkehatchie River, February 3.
- South Edisto River February 9. North Edisto River February 12–13. Columbia February 16–17.
- Fayetteville, North Carolina, March 11. Averysboro March 16. Battle of Bentonville March 19–21.
- Occupation of Goldsboro March 24. Advance on Raleigh April 10–14.
- Occupation of Raleigh April 14. Bennett's House April 26. Surrender of Johnston and his army.
- March to Washington, D.C., via Richmond, Virginia, April 29-May 20.
- Grand Review of the Armies May 24.
- Moved to Louisville, Kentucky, June.

== Casualties ==
The regiment lost a total of 359 men during service; 9 officers and 98 enlisted men killed or mortally wounded, 4 officers and 248 enlisted men died of disease.

== Commanders ==
- Colonel Walter Q. Gresham
- Colonel Warner L. Vestal

== See also ==
- List of Indiana Civil War regiments
- Indiana in the Civil War
