= Battery L, 2nd Illinois Light Artillery Regiment =

- Active: 28 Feb. 1862 – 9 Aug. 1865
- Country: United States
- Allegiance: (United States) Union; Illinois
- Branch: Union Army
- Type: Field Artillery
- Size: Artillery Battery
- Engagements: Battle of Shiloh; Siege of Corinth; Battle of Hatchie's Bridge; Battle of Port Gibson; Battle of Raymond; Battle of Jackson; Battle of Champion Hill; Siege of Vicksburg; Yazoo City expedition

Commanders
- Notable commanders: William H. Bolton; Erastus A. Nichols; Thaddeus C. Hulaniski

Battery L, 2nd Illinois Light Artillery Regiment was an artillery battery that served in the Union Army during the American Civil War. It was also referred to as Bolton's Battery, Hulaniski's Battery, and Nichols' Battery. The battery fought at Shiloh, Corinth, Hatchie's Bridge, Port Gibson, Raymond, Jackson, Champion Hill, Vicksburg, and Yazoo City. The unit mustered out in August 1865.

== Service ==
The battery was organized in Chicago, Illinois and mustered in for a three-year enlistment on February 28, 1862, under the command of Captain William H. Bolton.

The battery was attached to 4th Division, Army of the Tennessee, to July 1862. 4th Division, District of Jackson, Tennessee, to November 1862. 4th Division, XIII Corps, Department of the Tennessee, to December 1862. Artillery, 3rd Division, XVII Corps, to April 1864. Artillery, 1st Division, XVII Corps, to September 1864. Post and District of Vicksburg, Mississippi, to November 1864. Artillery Reserve, District of Vicksburg, Department of Mississippi, to August 1865.

Battery L, 2nd Illinois Light Artillery Regiment mustered out of service on August 9, 1865.

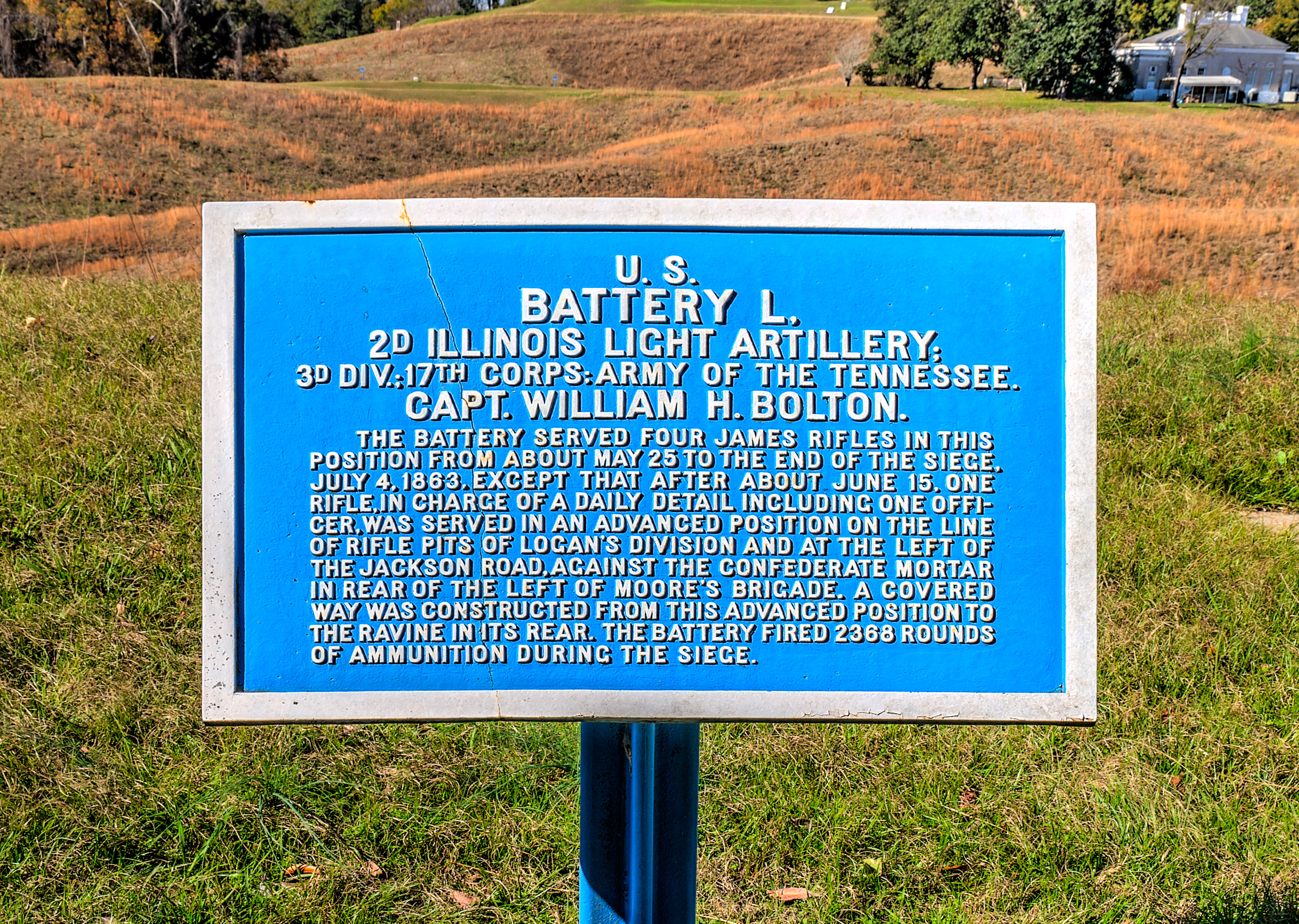
Marker at Vicksburg National Military Park

== Detailed service ==
Battle of Shiloh, April 6–7, 1862. Advance on and siege of Corinth, Mississippi, April 29-May 30. March to Memphis, Tennessee, via Grand Junction, Lagrange, Holly Springs, Moscow, and Germantown, June 1-July 21, and duty there until September. Moved to Bolivar September 6–14, and duty there until October 4. Battle of the Hatchie or Metamora October 5. Grant's Central Mississippi Campaign November 1862 to January 1863. Moved to Memphis, Tennessee, January 1863 then to Lake Providence, Louisiana, February 22. Duty there and at Milliken's Bend, Louisiana, until April. Movements on Bruinsburg and turning Grand Gulf April 25–30. Battle of Port Gibson, Mississippi, May 1. Battles of Raymond May 12, Jackson May 14, Champion Hill May 16. Siege of Vicksburg, Mississippi, May 18-July 4. Assaults on Vicksburg May 19 and 22. Surrender of Vicksburg July 4, and garrison duty there until August 1865. Expedition to Monroe, Louisiana, August 20-September 2, 1863. Expedition to Canton October 14–20. Action at Bogue Chitto Creek October 17. Expedition to Yazoo City May 4–21, 1864. Benton May 7 and 9. Vaughan May 12. Yazoo City May 13. Expedition from Vicksburg to Pearl River July 2–10. Near Jackson July 5. Jackson and Clinton July 7. At Vicksburg until August 1865.

== Casualties ==
The battery lost a total of 38 men during service; 4 enlisted men killed or mortally wounded, 2 officers and 32 enlisted men died of disease.

== Commanders ==
- Captain William H. Bolton - promoted to major
- Captain Erastus A. Nichols - resigned June 3, 1865
- Captain Thad C. Hulaniski - promoted June 12, 1865

== See also ==
- List of Illinois Civil War units
- Illinois in the Civil War
