= 12th Michigan Infantry Regiment =

- Michigan state flag
- Active: December 9, 1861, to February 15, 1866
- Country: United States
- Allegiance: Union
- Branch: Infantry
- Engagements: Battle of Shiloh; Siege of Vicksburg

The 12th Michigan Infantry Regiment was an infantry regiment that served in the Union Army during the American Civil War.

== Service ==
The 12th Michigan Infantry was organized at Niles, Dowagiac, and Buchanan, Michigan, and was mustered into Federal service for a three-year enlistment between December 9, 1861, and March 5, 1862 .

The regiment was mustered out on February 15, 1866.

== Total strength and casualties ==
The regiment suffered 1 officer and 52 enlisted men who were killed in action or mortally wounded and 3 officers and 372 enlisted men who died of disease, for a total of 428 fatalities.

== Commanders ==
- Colonel Francis Quinn
- Colonel William Graves
- Colonel Dwight May

== See also ==
- List of Michigan Civil War Units
- Michigan in the American Civil War
