= 32nd Illinois Infantry Regiment =

32nd Regiment Illinois Volunteer Infantry
- Illinois state flag
- Active: December 31, 1861, to September 16, 1865
- Country: United States
- Allegiance: Union
- Branch: Infantry
- Engagements: Battle of Shiloh; Battle of Champion's Hill; Battle of Big Black River; Siege of Vicksburg; Battle of Kennesaw Mountain; Battle of Atlanta; Battle of Jonesboro; March to the Sea; Battle of Bentonville

The 32nd Regiment Illinois Volunteer Infantry was an infantry regiment that served in the Union Army during the American Civil War.

== Service ==
The 32nd Illinois Infantry was organized at Camp Butler, Illinois and mustered into Federal service on December 31, 1861.

The regiment was mustered out on September 16, 1865, at Fort Leavenworth, Kansas.

== Total strength and casualties ==
The regiment suffered 8 officers and 90 enlisted men who were killed in action or who died of their wounds and 3 officer and 168 enlisted men who died of disease, for a total of 268 fatalities.

== Commanders ==
- Colonel John Logan
- Lieutenant Colonel George H. English - Mustered out with the regiment.
- Lieutenant Colonel William Hunter

== See also ==
- List of Illinois Civil War Units
- Illinois in the American Civil War
