= 46th Illinois Infantry Regiment =

46th Regiment Illinois Volunteer Infantry
- Illinois state flag
- Active: December 28, 1861, to January 20, 1866
- Country: United States
- Allegiance: Union
- Branch: Union Army
- Role: Infantry
- Engagements: American Civil War: Battle of Fort Henry; Battle of Fort Donelson; Battle of Shiloh; Siege of Corinth; Siege of Vicksburg

The 46th Regiment Illinois Volunteer Infantry was an infantry regiment that served in the Union Army during the American Civil War.

== Service ==
=== Organization ===
The 46th Illinois Infantry was organized at Camp Butler, Illinois and mustered into Federal service on December 28, 1861.

The companies of the regiment were recruited from the counties of:

- A - Stephenson County
- B - Stephenson County
- C - Stephenson County
- D - Lee County
- E - Whiteside and Ogle counties
- F - Richland County
- G - Stephenson County
- H - Dewitt and Ogle counties
- I - Lee, Ogle and Will counties
- K - Stephenson County

=== Early service ===
On February 11, 1862, the regiment left Camp Butler and arrived on Cairo, Illinois on February 12, before immediately being sent to Fort Donelson on the Belle Memphis steamer.

The regiment was mustered out on January 20, 1866.

== Total strength and casualties ==
The regiment suffered 7 officers and 74 enlisted men who were killed in action or mortally wounded and 1 officer and 253 enlisted men who died of disease, for a total of 335 fatalities.

== Commanders ==
- Colonel John A. Davis - died of wounds on October 10, 1862
- Lieutenant Colonel John J. Jones
- Colonel Benjamin Dornblaser - mustered out with the regiment.

== See also ==
- List of Illinois Civil War Units
- Illinois in the American Civil War
