= Jacob Gartner Lauman =

US Army general & businessman (1813-1867)

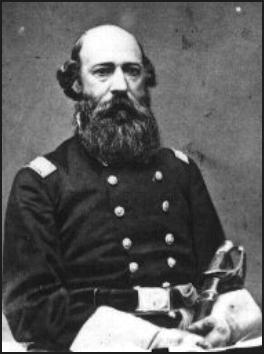
- Lauman, c. 1861–1865
- Born: January 20, 1813; Taneytown, Maryland, U.S.
- Died: February 9, 1867 (aged 54); Burlington, Iowa, U.S.
- Burial place: Aspen Grove Cemetery; Burlington, Iowa, U.S.
- Military career
- Allegiance: United States of America; Union
- Branch: United States Army; Union Army
- Service years: 1861–1865
- Rank: Brigadier General; Brevet Major General
- Commands: 7th Iowa Volunteer Infantry Regiment; 3rd Brigade, 4th Division, Army of the Tennessee; 4th Division, XVI Corps
- Conflicts: American Civil War; Battle of Fort Donelson; Battle of Shiloh; Battle of Hatchie's Bridge; Siege of Vicksburg; Siege of Jackson
- Other work: Businessman

Jacob Gartner Lauman (January 20, 1813 – February 9, 1867) was an American businessman from Iowa and a controversial general in the Union Army during the American Civil War.

He commanded an infantry brigade in the Army of the Tennessee in several campaigns in the Western Theater, and then led a division during the 1863 Vicksburg Campaign, where his inadequate performance in the Siege of Jackson led to his being sent home for the rest of the war without a subsequent command.

== Early life and career ==
Lauman was born in Taneytown, Maryland. He grew up in York, Pennsylvania, and was educated at the York County Academy. In 1844, he moved to Burlington, Iowa, and became a successful businessman engaged in commerce.

== Civil War service ==
Following the outbreak of the Civil War, Lauman was actively engaged in recruiting volunteers to join several new military companies he was raising. He received a commission from the Governor of Iowa, Samuel J. Kirkwood, as the colonel of the 7th Iowa Infantry on July 11, 1861. He first saw action in the Western Theater and served under Maj. Gen. Ulysses S. Grant in Missouri. Lauman was severely wounded in his left thigh during the Battle of Belmont on November 7. His 7th Iowa was distinguished for gallant conduct during the fighting, and it suffered greater loss than any other regiment taking part in the engagement, amounting to more than 400 killed, wounded and missing.

He returned to his regiment in time for the next campaign, but then was given brigade command. He was appointed to lead the 4th Brigade, 2nd Division during Grant's attack on Fort Donelson in Tennessee, and was among the first troops to storm and enter the Confederate works. In recognition of his service at Fort Donelson, he was promoted to brigadier general in the Union Army on March 21, 1862. Subsequently, Lauman commanded a brigade in Maj. Gen. Stephen A. Hurlbut's division at the Battle of Shiloh on April 6–7, 1862.

Lauman commanded his brigade in the Battle of Hatchie's Bridge in rural Tennessee, an action on October 6, 1862. Maj. Gen. Edward O.C. Ord led a detachment of the Army of West Tennessee on an expedition aimed at destroying Confederate Maj. Gen. Earl Van Dorn's Army of West Tennessee as it retreated from Corinth, Mississippi.

In 1863, Lauman led the 4th Division of the XVI Corps during the Siege of Vicksburg. He was relieved of duty by the order of Maj. Gen. William T. Sherman shortly after the capture of Jackson, Mississippi, on July 16, 1863. He failed to properly execute orders on how to deploy his troops from his immediate superior, Ord, who accused him of wanton disregard for the orders that led to a heavy loss in casualties.

Lauman subsequently returned to Iowa to await his next assignment. Orders were never forthcoming, and Lauman sat out the rest of the war. However, in the omnibus promotions following the war, he received a brevet promotion to major general in the Union Army, dating from March 13, 1865. He formally mustered out of the volunteer service on August 24.

== Postbellum ==
Lauman resumed his commercial ventures, but he suffered ill health from his lingering Belmont wound. He tried without success to clear his name, blaming his failure on a misunderstanding.

Lauman died in Burlington, Iowa, in February 1867. He was buried in Aspen Grove Cemetery in Burlington.

== In memory ==
- A bronze bust of Jacob Gartner Lauman, sculpted by H. Hinson Perry, stands on the Vicksburg Battlefield on Wisconsin Avenue in the city of Vicksburg itself.
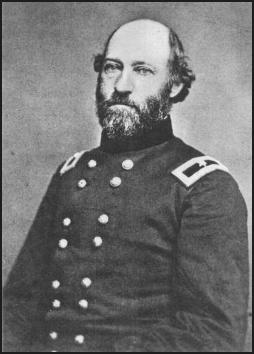
Jacob Lauman in his brigadier general's uniform; photo taken after 1862 promotion

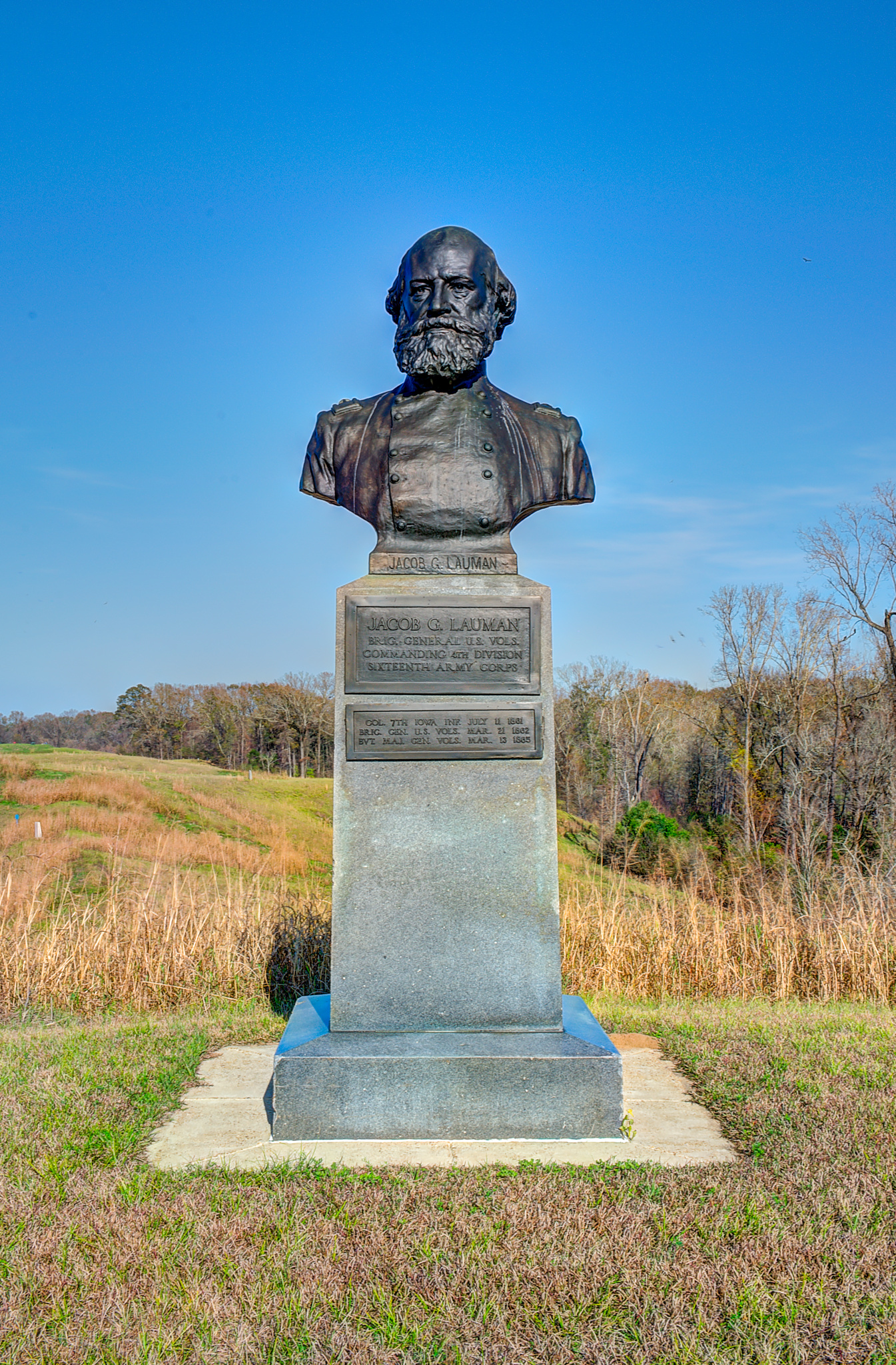
Bust of Lauman at Vicksburg National Military Park

== See also ==
- List of American Civil War generals (Union)
