= Stephen A. Hurlbut =

American politician

Stephen Augustus Hurlbut
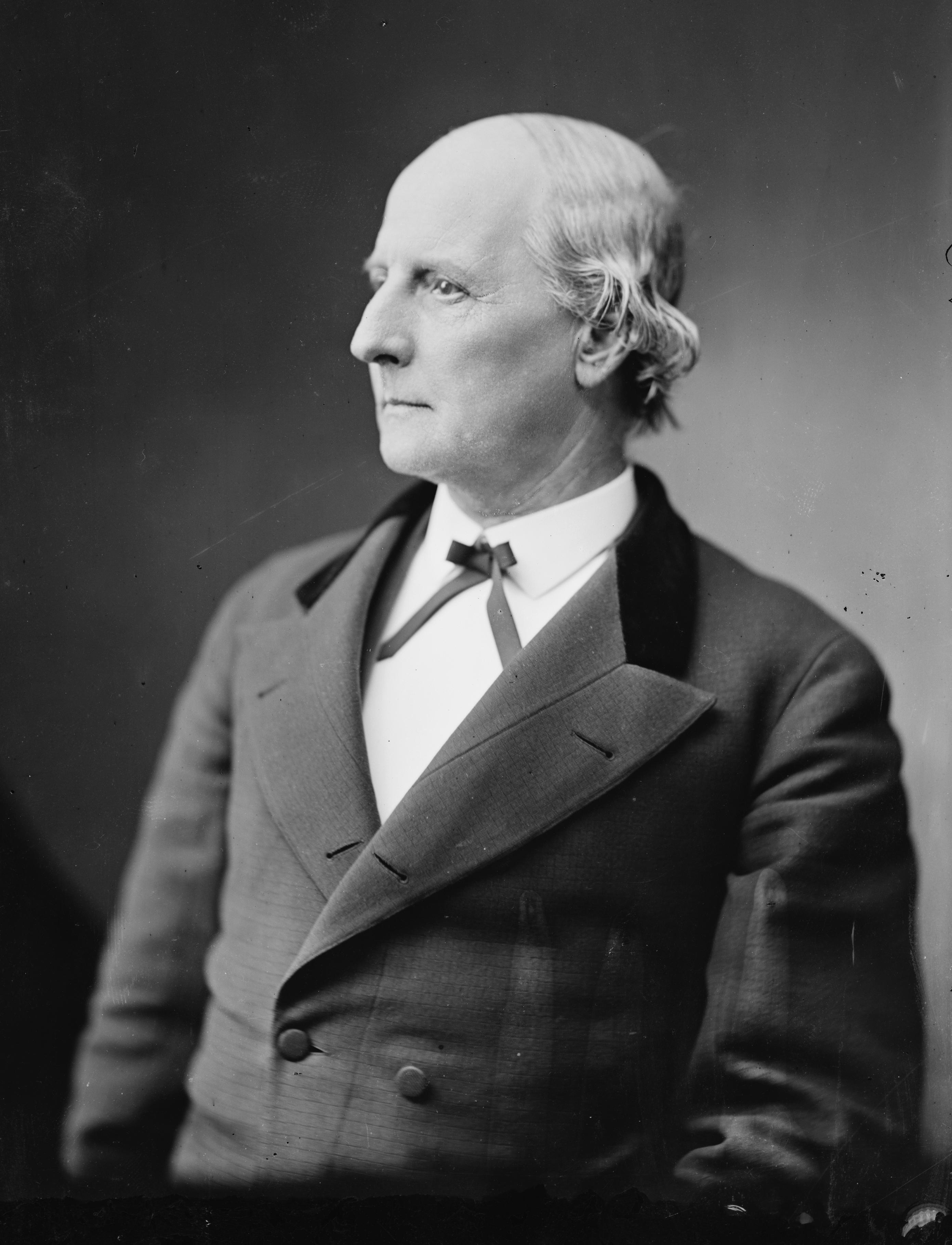
- Hurlbut c. 1870–80

Member of the U.S. House of Representatives from Illinois's 4th district
- In office March 4, 1873 – March 3, 1877
- Preceded by: John B. Hawley
- Succeeded by: William Lathrop

Personal details
- Born: November 29, 1815 Charleston, South Carolina, U.S.
- Died: March 27, 1882 (aged 66) Lima, Peru
- Resting place: Belvidere Cemetery, Belvidere, Illinois
- Party: Republican

Military service
- Allegiance: United States of America; Union
- Branch/service: United States Army; Union Army
- Years of service: 1835-42, 1861–1865
- Rank: Major General
- Commands: XVI Corps; Department of the Gulf
- Battles/wars: Second Seminole War; American Civil War; Battle of Shiloh; Siege of Corinth; Battle of Hatchie's Bridge

Stephen Augustus Hurlbut (November 29, 1815 – March 27, 1882) was an attorney and politician, who commanded the U.S. Army of the Gulf in the American Civil War. Afterward, he continued to serve as a politician and also as a diplomat.

Although born and educated in the South, his parents were from the North and his father was a Unitarian minister. After passing the bar, Hurlbut moved at the age of 30 to Illinois to set up a practice. There he married and had a family.

When war broke out, he supported the Union and Republican Party. Hurlbut was present at the Battle of Shiloh and served under General Sherman during the Meridian Expedition.

After the war, he returned to politics. He served in various capacities, being appointed as Minister to Colombia and elected as a U.S. congressman from Illinois.

== Early life ==
Hurlbut was born in 1815 in Charleston, South Carolina, to Martin Luther Hurlbut and Lydia Bunce, who were from the North. His father was a Unitarian minister and educator. He had been president of Beaufort College in South Carolina from 1812 to 1814. Hurlbut studied law with James L. Petigru as his mentor, worked for him as a law clerk, and was admitted to the South Carolina Bar in 1837. During the Second Seminole War, he served as adjutant of a South Carolina infantry regiment.

In 1845, Hurlbut moved north to Illinois, a free state. He established a law practice in Belvidere. He started his own family in 1847 after marrying Sophronia R. Stevens; they had two children together.

In 1847, Hurlbut took part in the Illinois constitutional convention as a Whig delegate. He served as a presidential elector for the Whig Party in the 1848 presidential election, and became acquainted with Abraham Lincoln during campaigning for Old Rough and Ready Zachary Taylor.

He was elected to the Illinois House of Representatives in 1859 and re-elected in 1861.

Hurlbut campaigned for Lincoln during the presidential election in 1860 and attended Lincoln's first inauguration on March 4, 1861. He and Colonel Ward H. Lamon performed a fact-finding mission at Lincoln's request, and visited Charleston on March 24–26, 1861, to investigate and report, "the actual state of feeling in this City & State." Lamon received a separate assignment from William H. Seward to visit Fort Sumter.

On March 27, 1861, Hurlbut wrote a detailed report in which he stated,

There is positively nothing to appeal to — the Sentiment of National Patriotism always feeble in Carolina, has been extinguished and overridden by the acknowledged doctrine of the paramount allegiance to the State. False political economy diligently taught for years has now become an axiom & merchants and business men believe and act upon the belief — that great growth of trade and expansion of material prosperity will & must follow the Establishment of a Southern Republic. They expect a golden era, when Charleston shall be a great commercial emporium & control for the South as New York does for the North.

== Civil War ==
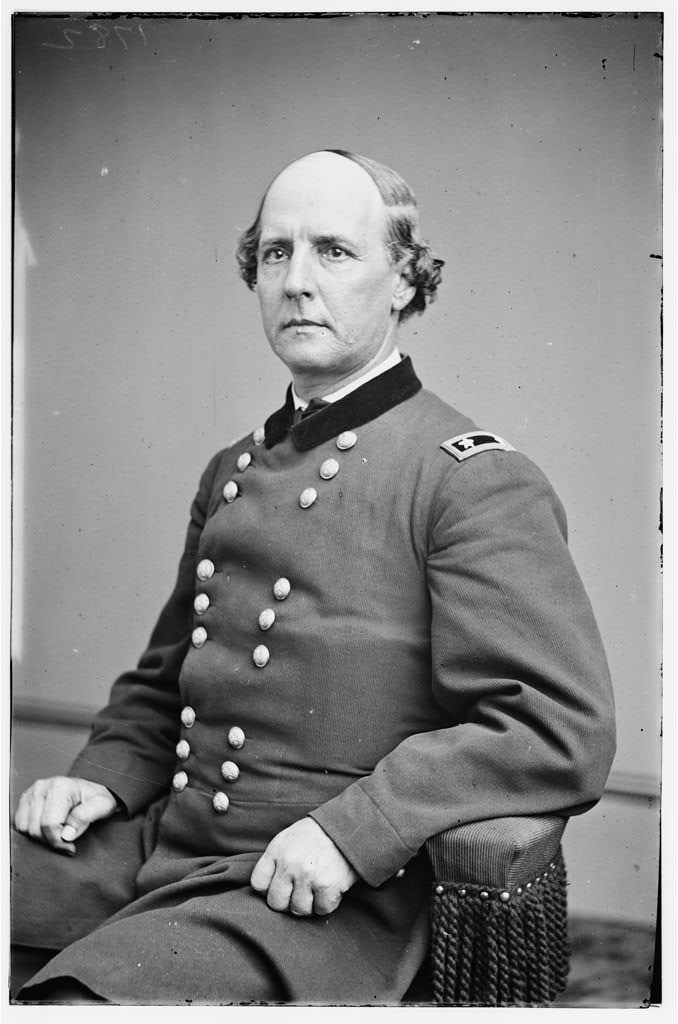
General Hurlbut

When the Civil War erupted, Hurlbut joined the Union Army. He was commissioned as a brigadier general, U.S. Volunteers, on May 17, 1861, and a major general on September 17, 1862.

He commanded the 4th Division, Army of the Tennessee at the Battle of Shiloh, and in the advance towards Corinth and the subsequent siege. He also led a division at the Battle of Hatchie's Bridge, taking command of the entire Union force after Gen Edward Ord was wounded.

Hurlbut commanded XVI Corps from his headquarters at Memphis, Tennessee. Historian Bertram Korn has suggested that, during Hurlbut's garrison duty at Memphis, Tennessee, the brigadier general issued antisemitic orders confiscating Jewish property and preventing Jews from trading.

Hurlbut led a corps under William T. Sherman in the 1864 Meridian expedition. He subsequently commanded the Department of the Gulf, succeeding Nathaniel P. Banks and serving in that capacity for the remainder of the war. Hurlbut was suspected of embezzlement during his term. General Edward R. S. Canby ordered a court-martial proceeding and the arrest of Hurlbut. However, he was allowed to resign in June 1865.

== Postwar years ==
After mustering out of the Union Army on June 20, 1865, Hurlbut became one of the founding fathers of the Grand Army of the Republic. He served as commander-in-chief from 1866 to 1868.

He was appointed Minister Resident to Colombia in 1869, where he served three years. In 1872, Hurlbut was elected to the U.S. House of Representatives (R-Illinois). Re-elected for a second term in 1874, he was defeated in 1876.

Hurlbut was appointed as ambassador to Peru in 1881. In that capacity he had a row with General Hugh Judson Kilpatrick, U.S. minister to Chile during the War of the Pacific. Each man had become a partisan of the country to which he was assigned to represent Hurlbut continued to serve as U.S. ambassador to Peru until his death in Lima in 1882.

His body was returned to Belvidere, Illinois for burial. Hurlbut and his wife are buried together in Belvidere Cemetery, Belvidere, Illinois.

== See also ==
- List of American Civil War generals (Union)
- William Henry Hurlbert

== Notes ==
- According to Donald T. Phillips, author of Lincoln on Leadership (1992), Hachette Book Group, N.Y., N.Y., Stephen A. Hurlbut was "one of his (Lincoln's) trusted colleagues." Lincoln sent him "on a fact-finding mission to Charleston .... to meet with the Confederate leaders, evaluate the situation (i.e., the crisis developing over Ft. Sumter) and report back...." "War, according to Hurlbut, was inevitable, unless the South was allowed to secede." As a result of this report, "Lincoln decided to resupply the embattled fort; if his ships were fired upon, it would be the Confederacy that started the war, not the Union."

U.S. House of Representatives
Preceded by John B. Hawley	Member of the U.S. House of Representatives from Illinois's 4th congressional district March 4, 1873–March 3, 1877	Succeeded by William Lathrop
Diplomatic posts
Preceded by Peter J. Sullivan	United States Minister to Colombia; November 13, 1869–April 3, 1872	Succeeded by William L. Scruggs
Preceded by Isaac P. Christiancy	United States Minister to Peru; August 2, 1881–March 27, 1882	Succeeded by Seth Ledyard Phelps

Political offices
Preceded by Benjamin F. Stephenson	Commander-in-Chief of the Grand Army of the Republic; 1866 – 1868	Succeeded by John A. Logan
