= Battle of Raymond order of battle: Union =

The following Union Army units and commanders fought in the Battle of Raymond of the American Civil War. The Confederate order of battle is listed separately.

== Abbreviations used ==
=== Military rank ===
- MG = Major General
- BG = Brigadier General
- Col = Colonel
- Ltc = Lieutenant Colonel
- Maj = Major
- Cpt = Captain
- Lt = 1st Lieutenant

=== Other ===
- w = wounded
- k = killed

== Union Forces ==
=== XVII Corps ===
MG James B. McPherson

Division	Brigade	Regiments and Others
Third Division; BG John A. Logan	1st Brigade BG John E. Smith	20th Illinois: Ltc Evan Richards (k), Maj Daniel Bradley; 31st Illinois: Col Edwin Stanton McCook (w), Ltc John D. Reese; 45th Illinois: Col Jasper A. Maltby; 124th Illinois: Col Thomas J. Sloan; 23rd Indiana: Ltc William P. Davis
Third Division; BG John A. Logan	2nd Brigade BG Elias Smith Dennis	30th Illinois: Ltc Warren Shedd; 20th Ohio: Col Manning Force; 68th Ohio: Col Robert Kingston Scott; 78th Ohio: Ltc Zachariah M. Chandler
Third Division; BG John A. Logan	3rd Brigade BG John Dunlap Stevenson	8th Illinois: Ltc Robert H. Sturgess; 81st Illinois: Col James J. Dollins; 7th Missouri: Maj Edwin Wakefield; 32nd Ohio: Col Benjamin F. Potts
Third Division; BG John A. Logan	Artillery Maj C. J. Stolbrand	Battery D, 1st Illinois Light Artillery (4 guns): Cpt Henry A. Rogers; Battery H, 1st Michigan Light Artillery (6 guns): Cpt Samuel DeGolyer; 3rd Battery, Ohio Light Artillery (6 guns): Cpt William S. Williams
Seventh Division; BG Marcellus M. Crocker	1st Brigade Col John B. Sanborn	48th Indiana: Col Norman Eddy; 59th Indiana: Col Jesse I. Alexander; 4th Minnesota: Ltc John E. Tourtellotte
Seventh Division; BG Marcellus M. Crocker	2nd Brigade Col Samuel A. Holmes	17th Iowa: Col David B. Hillis; 10th Missouri: Ltc Leonidas Horney; 80th Ohio: Col Matthew H. Bartilson
Seventh Division; BG Marcellus M. Crocker	3rd Brigade Col George B. Boomer	93rd Illinois: Col Holden Putnam; 5th Iowa: Ltc Ezekiel S. Sampson; 10th Iowa: Col William E. Small; 26th Missouri: Maj Charles F. Brown
Seventh Division; BG Marcellus M. Crocker	Artillery	11th Battery, Ohio Light Artillery (6 guns): Lt Fletcher S. Armstrong
Seventh Division; BG Marcellus M. Crocker	Provisional Cavalry Battalion Cpt J. S. Foster	2nd Illinois Cavalry (Companies A & E): Lt William B. Cummins; 4th Missouri Cavalry (Company F): Lt Alexander Mueller; 4th Independent Company, Ohio Cavalry: Cpt John S. Foster
Seventh Division; BG Marcellus M. Crocker	Engineers	Wiles' Pioneers (Provisional) [Company C, 78th Ohio]: Cpt Greenbury F. Wiles

== See also ==
- Mississippi in the American Civil War

== Sources ==
- Bearss, Edwin C. (1991) [1986]. The Campaign for Vicksburg. Vol. II: Grant Strikes a Fatal Blow. Dayton, Ohio: Morningside Bookshop. ISBN 0-89029-313-9.
