= William R. Rowley =

American judge

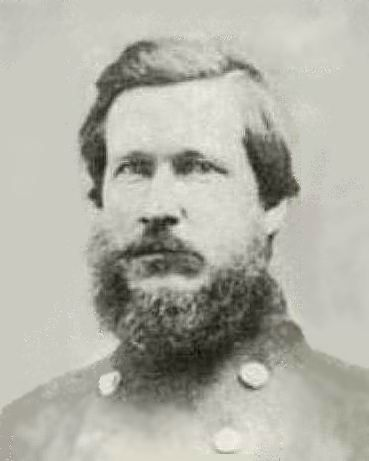
- Born: February 8, 1824; St. Lawrence County, New York
- Died: February 9, 1886 (aged 62); Galena, Illinois
- Military career
- Allegiance: United States
- Branch: Union Army
- Service years: 1861–1864
- Rank: Lieutenant Colonel; Brevet Brigadier General
- Units: 45th Illinois Infantry Regiment; Army of the Tennessee
- Conflicts: American Civil War: Battle of Fort Donelson; Battle of Shiloh; Battle of Vicksburg
- Other work: County clerk, Judge and Sheriff of Jo Daviess County

William Ruben Rowley (February 8, 1824 – February 9, 1886) was a lieutenant colonel and Military Secretary (Note: A position usually held by a major general) on the staff of General Ulysses S. Grant during the American Civil War later being brevetted a brigadier general. After moving from New York to Galena, Illinois, he taught in the local school, while also becoming involved in local politics. While living in Galena, Rowley was a neighbor and good friends with Ulysses Grant and John Rawlins before and at the time the Civil War broke out. Under General Grant he fought in the Battle of Shiloh and during the siege at Vicksburg. He was one of nine Civil War generals that came from Galena. After serving in the Union Army he returned to Galena and service in political life. Rowley was among several officers who wrote letters for and rigorously defended Grant against accusations from rivals and reporters that Grant was drinking at the Battle of Shiloh, a battle that he brought to victory. On other occasions during his military and political career Rowley stood by Grant during times of controversy.

== Early life ==
William Rowley was born on February 8, 1824, in Gouverneur, New York, in St. Lawrence County, in northernmost New York. He came to Galena, in Jo Daviess County, Illinois, in 1843, and taught school in Brown County, Ohio, and in Jo Daviess County, Illinois. Rowley married Elizabeth Miller in 1847, with their marriage producing four children. However, a discrepancy exists between accounts of his wife's name and number of children, i.e. it is also reported that her maiden name was Caroline Brush, whom he married in February 1862, in North Port, Suffolk County, NY, and mentions only three children, Charles, Alice, and Martha.

In 1849 Rowley was appointed assessor and collector for Jo Daviess County. Between 1847 and 1861, Rowley held several other positions for the county government, including deputy circuit clerk and sheriff. Future soldier and author, Wilbur F. Crummer, who later wrote a book (Note: See Bibliography) about his experiences with Grant, Rowley, Rawlins and others, was then under the employ of Rowley at this time. In 1861 Rowley moved his family to 515 Hill Street in Galena, next door to the home of John Rawlins. Notable people such as Ulysses S. Grant, John Rawlins and Illinois Congressman, Elihu B. Washburne, were among Rowley's neighbors and were residents of Galena at the time.

== Civil War ==
When the Confederates attacked Fort Sumter on April 12, 1861, and the news reached Galena the day after, Rowley was among the roused gathering that assembled in town. Also among them was future generals Ulysses S. Grant, and John Rawlins. Rawlins later became Secretary of War when Grant was elected president in 1869. After Rawlins' inspiring speech Grant confided in Rowley, saying that the speech "stirred my patriotism" and had rekindled his military ardor. As the crowd dispersed Rowley said to Grant, "Well Captain Grant, it was a fine meeting after all", where Grant replied quietly, "Yes: we're about to do something now."

On November 13, 1861, Rowley was appointed first lieutenant of Company D of the 45th Illinois Infantry Regiment, attached to the Army of the Tennessee, and officially joined the war effort on November 20, 1861, in Colonel John E. Smith's 45th Illinois, commonly known among soldiers as the Washburne Lead Mine Regiment. (Note: Organized at Galena, Ill., and mustered in at Camp Douglas, Ill., December 25, 1861.) At that time Rowley represented Grant's strongest tie with his Republican supporters in Galena, especially Elihu B. Washburne. As Rowley was constantly with Grant, he was well informed of Grant's affairs and whereabouts. Grant at times would use Rowley to communicate information or for forwarding requests to Washington

=== Battle of Fort Donelson ===
Rowley fought with the 45th Illinois volunteers at the Battle of Fort Donelson, in which General Grant's army captured the confederate fort, commanded by Brig. Gen. John B. Floyd, in February, 1862. After the battle Rowley was commissioned captain and transferred to Grant's staff as an aide-de-camp. Grant, having been promoted to major general, was permitted three aides and chose his friend and former neighbor from Galena as his third aide. After service at Fort Donelson, Rowley was moved to and was stationed at Savannah from March 4–11.

=== Battle of Shiloh ===
Rowley also fought in the Battle of Shiloh in April 1862. Due to the surprise of his army and the consequent heavy loss of life at Shiloh, General Grant was strongly criticized in many Northern newspapers. Grant had placed much of the blame on General Lew Wallace, whom he had sent verbal orders to, accusing Wallace of failing to following those orders, which he believed resulted in the delay of Wallace in moving up his troops to the front during the first day of the battle, nearly resulting in a Union defeat. After learning that Wallace refused to obey anything but written orders, an angry General Grant asserted that a division general ought to take his troops to wherever the firing may be, even without orders", and first sent Rowley, ordering him to "tell him to come up at once" and that "if he should require a written order of you, you will give it to him at once", while also instructing Rowley to make sure he brought writing materials.

Rowley finally caught up to where Wallace and one brigade of his division last were, only to find a supply wagon departing the scene. He rode on further and found General Wallace at the head of his column near Clear Creek, positioned on high ground. Rowley pulled Wallace off to the side and warned him of the danger that lay just ahead, exclaiming, "I've been sent to hurry you up. Don't you know that Sherman has been driven back? Why, the whole (Confederate) army is within half a mile of the river, and it's a question if we are not all going to be driven into it." Rowley further exclaimed, "I had a devil of a time finding you!" Wallace asked, "Does General Grant send me orders?" Rowley replied, "Yes, he wants you at Pittsburg Landing—and he wants you there like hell." Actually, Wallace had received an order from Grant that had passed through two other staffers, directing him to the right of the army, which Grant denied was Wallace's destination. Wallace stunned by the news, said that was the second such message he received and immediately sent his cavalry ahead to assess the situation. Upon their return they had confirmed Rowley's claim, and Wallace countermarched to reach the battlefield. Later, in his Autobiography, Wallace wrote about his encounter with Rowley, how he realized he was at the rear of the entire Confederate army, and how he was stunned by the news. Rowley and Lieutenant Colonel Douglas Putnam later corroborated Grant's account of the event when Grant was being criticized for the heavy losses involved in the battle. In the aftermath of the costly battle, rumors also emerged that Grant was delayed at Savannah because he had been drinking.

Rowley and other officers that were with Grant gave a starkly different account of his capacity, and performance, than those of disgruntled or enterprising newspaper reporters who were far away from Grant during the battle. (Note: A number of reporters had previous bad experiences with Generals Halleck and Grant.) Answering a letter of inquiry about newspaper reports, Rowley maintained Grant's innocence. The letter below is addressed to Edward Hempstead, (Note: A relative of Washburne) and was copied by him and forwarded to Washburne. (Note: The text comes from the copy in the Washburne Papers, Library of Congress.)

Head Quarters Army in the Field

Near Pittsburg Tenn, April 19th 1862

E Hempstead Esqr

... I pronounce it an unmitigated slander. I have been on his Staff ever since the Donelson affair (and saw him frequently during that) and necessary in close contact with him every day, and I have never seen him take even a glass of liquor more than two or three times in my life and then only a single at a time. And I have never seen him intoxicated or even approximate to it. As to the story that he was intoxicated at the Battle of Pittsburg, I have only to say that the man who fabricated the story is an infamous liar, and you are at liberty to say to him that I say so. ...

Yours &c W R ROWLEY

P S I can probably explain to you some of the reasons why this man Chapman (Note: Frank G. Chapman, reporter for the New York Herald, was previously expelled from General Halleck's district. Chapman, who wrote an inaccurate newspaper article of the battle at Shiloh, had a reputation for slipshod journalism.) has such an interest in lying about Gen Grant. When he was at Donelson he made himself so obnoxious that Gen Grant issued a special order, directing him to be removed outside of our lines, and to remain there.

Several days later, Rowley wrote directly to Washburne about the misgivings concerning the battle, although the primary reason for the letter was to recommend the promotions of Grant's aides Clark B. Lagow and William S. Hillyer to colonel. This letter is also in the Library of Congress and among the Washburne Papers.

Head Quarters Army of the Tennessee
Pittsburg April 23d 1862

Friend Washburne I have intended ever since the Battle at this place to have written you a letter, but the hurry and confusion incident to such a fight as we have had prevented ... it. ... First however a word with reference to the Thousand and one stories that are afloat with reference to Gen Grant suffice it to say they have the same foundation as did those that were circulated after the Battle of Donelson and no more: It is sufficient to say that Gen Halleck is now here and the conduct of the Battle and all the details meet his entire approbation and the stories in circulation have their origin in the efforts of Cowardly hounds who "stampeded" and now would be glad to turn public attention from themselves, and direct it elsewhere, together with the eagerness of Newspaper Correspondents to get items I who was on the field know that had it not been for the almost superhuman efforts of the Gen' added to the assistance he had from his officers we would have been forced to Record a defeat instead of one of the most Brilliant victories that was ever won on any field ...

Yours &c W R ROWLEY

Rawlins corroborated Rowley's account of Grant's whereabouts and performance, maintaining that the rumors were typically "unmitigated slander" and that he had never seen Grant at any time take a drink, and that "Grant and his staff" were on the battlefield by 7 A.M. Colonel John E. Smith, also of the 45th Illinois, corroborated Rowley's claim as well, maintaining that the army was "astonished" to hear such claims, and that they were made by "those who are jealous of him". Colonel Jacob Ammen, who had also seen Grant at Savannah and at Pittsburg Landing, in like manner claimed "I am satisfied General Grant was not under the influence of liquor, either of the times I saw him. Rowley was soon promoted to Major General of Volunteers and later served on a detail as Provost Marshal General of Departments of Tennessee and Cumberland, in 1863.

=== Vicksburg campaign ===
Rowley was also present during the Vicksburg Campaign during the late spring of 1863. He was appointed Lieutenant Colonel and Military Secretary on Grant's Staff when Grant assumed the rank of lieutenant general on March 2, 1864. (Note: James B. McPherson and John Rawlins were also members of Grant's staff.) He remained in that position until his health began to fail in October of that year, after the Wilderness campaign, forcing him to resign from the army. Rowley was one among nine Civil War generals that came from Galena, Illinois. (Note: The other eight generals from Galena were : Ulysses Simpson Grant, Augustus Louis Chetlain, John Oliver Duerr, Jasper Adalmorn Maltby, Ely Samuel Parker, John Aaron Rawlins, John Corson Smith and John Eugene Smith.)

== Later life ==
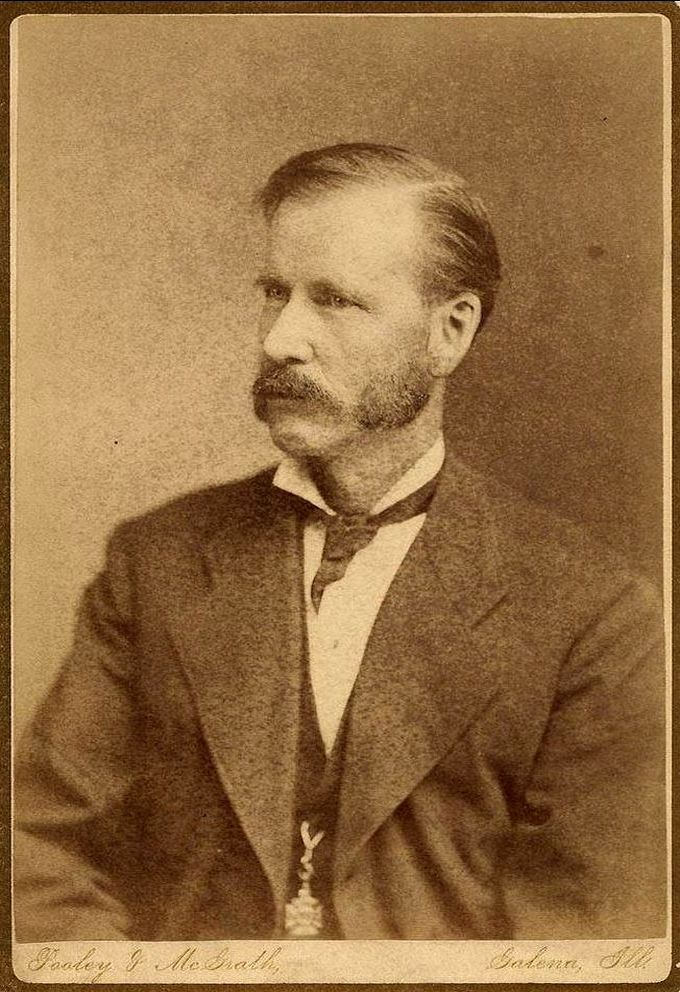
William Rowley in 1878

After his military career, Rowley returned to the post of Jo Daviess County Circuit Clerk until 1876, and later was judge of the county court. In July 1866, for his service in the war, Rowley was brevetted Brigadier General of volunteers on Grant's recommendation. He remained friends with fellow soldier Wilbur Crummer with whom he often talked about events they shared together during the Civil War. Crummer, in his 1915 book about the battles of Fort Donelson, Shiloh and Vicksburg, noted that enemies of Grant circulated stories about his alleged drinking, and wrote of Rowley, that any time the subject came up, it would prove to be "the spark that exploded the magazine of wrath and where Rowley would typically reply: "All a damned lie", sentiments that were also shared by Crummer.

In June 1880, while the Republican Convention was in session in Chicago, former general and president Grant and his family were living in Galena. After being persuaded by his wife and political friends to stand for a nomination and run for office a third time, he finally consented. Grant would come down town in the morning on a daily basis and would spend an hour or two with Judge Rowley, now an old friend and former comrade, at his office, and would often talk about his recent tour around the world. During the convention Rowley's office would receive many telegrams, and while Rowley and others would receive them with great interest, Grant showed little, until one arrived with some descending news about an old trusted friend, Elihu B. Washburne, also on the list of presidential nominations. Washburne, now a competitor of Grant, was withdrawing his support and making disparaging statements about Grant, which ultimately ended their long friendship. While Grant received the news in his usual calm manner, Rowley and others, however, were very outspoken with their denunciation of Washburne.

Rowley spent his final years in Galena and died on February 9, 1886, at the age of 62, and is buried in Galena's Greenwood Cemetery.

== See also ==
- List of American Civil War brevet generals (Union)
- Bibliography of Ulysses S. Grant

== Bibliography ==
Publications

- Andrews, J Cutler (1955). The North Reports the Civil War. University of Pittsburgh Press. ISBN 9780822974307.
- Bale, Florence Gratiot (1946). Historic Galena: Yesterday and Today. Galena Advertiser.
- Bonekemper, Edward H. (2004). A Victor, Not a Butcher: Ulysses S. Grant's Overlooked Military Genius. Washington: Regnery. ISBN 0-89526-062-X.
- Catton, Bruce (1960). Grant Moves South. Boston: Little, Brown. ISBN 0-316-13207-1.
- Crummer, Wilbur F. (1915). With Grant at Fort Donelson, Shiloh and Vicksburg. E. C. Crummer & Co.
- Dana, Charles Anderson (1909). Recollections of the Civil War. D. Appleton and Company.
- Daniel, Larry J. (2008). Shiloh: The Battle That Changed the Civil War. Simon and Schuster. ISBN 978-1-4391-2861-9.
- Grant, Ulysses S. (2003). Personal Memoirs of Ulysses S. Grant. Barnes & Noble Publishing. ISBN 9780760749906.
- Groom, Winston (20 March 2012). Shiloh 1862. National Geographic Books. ISBN 978-1-4262-0879-9.
- Johnson, Robert Underwood; Buel, Clarence Clough (1887). Battles and Leaders of the Civil War, Volume 1. Century Company.
- Mahoney, Timothy R. (2016). From Hometown to Battlefield in the Civil War Era: Middle Class Life in Midwest America. Cambridge University Press. ISBN 978-1-3167-2078-3.
- McFeely, William S. (1981). Grant: A Biography. Norton. ISBN 0-393-01372-3.
- Richardson, Albert Deane; Fletcher, R. H. (1885). A Personal History of Ulysses S. Grant. American Publishing Company.
- Smith, Jean Edward (2001). Grant. New York: Simon & Schuster. ISBN 0-684-84927-5.
- Smith, Timothy B. (2013). Rethinking Shiloh: Myth and Memory. Univ. of Tennessee Press. ISBN 978-1-5723-3988-0.
- Stephens, Gail (2010). Shadow of Shiloh: Major General Lew Wallace in the Civil War. Indiana Historical Society. ISBN 978-0-8719-5287-5.
- Wallace, Lew (1998). Leeke, Jim (ed.). Smoke, Sound & Fury: The Civil War Memoirs of Major-General Lew Wallace, U.S. Volunteers. Strawberry Hill Press. ISBN 978-0-8940-7124-9.
- White, Ronald C. (2016). American Ulysses: A Life of Ulysses S. Grant. Random House Publishing Group. ISBN 978-1-5883-6992-5.
- Wilson, James Harrison (1916). The life of John A. Rawlins, lawyer, assistant adjutant-general, chief of staff, major general of volunteers, and secretary of war. The Neale Publishing Company.

Woodworth, Steven E. (2005). Nothing but Victory -- The Army of the Tennessee 1861–1865. Alfred A. Knoff. ISBN 978-0-3757-2660-6.

- "The Ulysses S. Grant Association Newsletter(s), Volume X: (X,1–X,4)". Ulysses S. Grant Presidential Library / Ulysses S. Grant Association. 1972–1973. Archived from the original on 2016-03-28.

Internet sources

- "William Rueben Rowley, Essay". Galena Historical Society and Ulysses S. Grant Museum. 2012.
- "Galena's Nine Generals". Galena Historical Society and Ulysses S. Grant Museum. 2012.
- "45th Regiment Infantry "Washburn Lead Mine Regiment"". American Civil War Archive. 2016.

Further reading

- Daniel, Larry J. (2008). Shiloh: The Battle That Changed the Civil War. Simon and Schuster. ISBN 9781439128619.
- Mahoney, Timothy R. (2016). From Hometown to Battlefield in the Civil War Era: Middle Class Life in Midwest America. Cambridge University Press. ISBN 9781316720783.
- Lindsey, Thomas Jefferson (1903). Ohio at Shiloh: Report of the Commission. Ohio. Shiloh Battlefield Commission; C. J. Krehbiel & Company.
- Risley, Ford (2012). Civil War Journalism. ABC-CLIO. ISBN 978-0-3133-4727-6.
- Wallace, Lew (1906). Lew Wallace An Autobiography, Vol I. Harper And Brothers, London.
- —— (1906). Lew Wallace An Autobiography, Vol II. Harper And Brothers, London.
- Lew Wallace, militant romantic
