= John Tourtellotte =

John Tourtellotte may refer to:

- John E. Tourtellotte (1869–1939), American architect
- John Eaton Tourtellotte (1833–1891), American Union Army general
