= 12th Illinois Infantry Regiment =

- Active: May 2, 1861 to July 18, 1865
- Country: United States
- Allegiance: Union
- Branch: Infantry
- Size: Regiment
- Garrison/HQ: Cairo, Illinois
- Nickname: "1st Scotch Regiment"
- Engagements: Battle of Fort Donelson; Battle of Shiloh; Battle of Corinth; Battle of Resaca; Battle of Atlanta; Battle of Jonesboro; March to the Sea; Battle of Bentonville

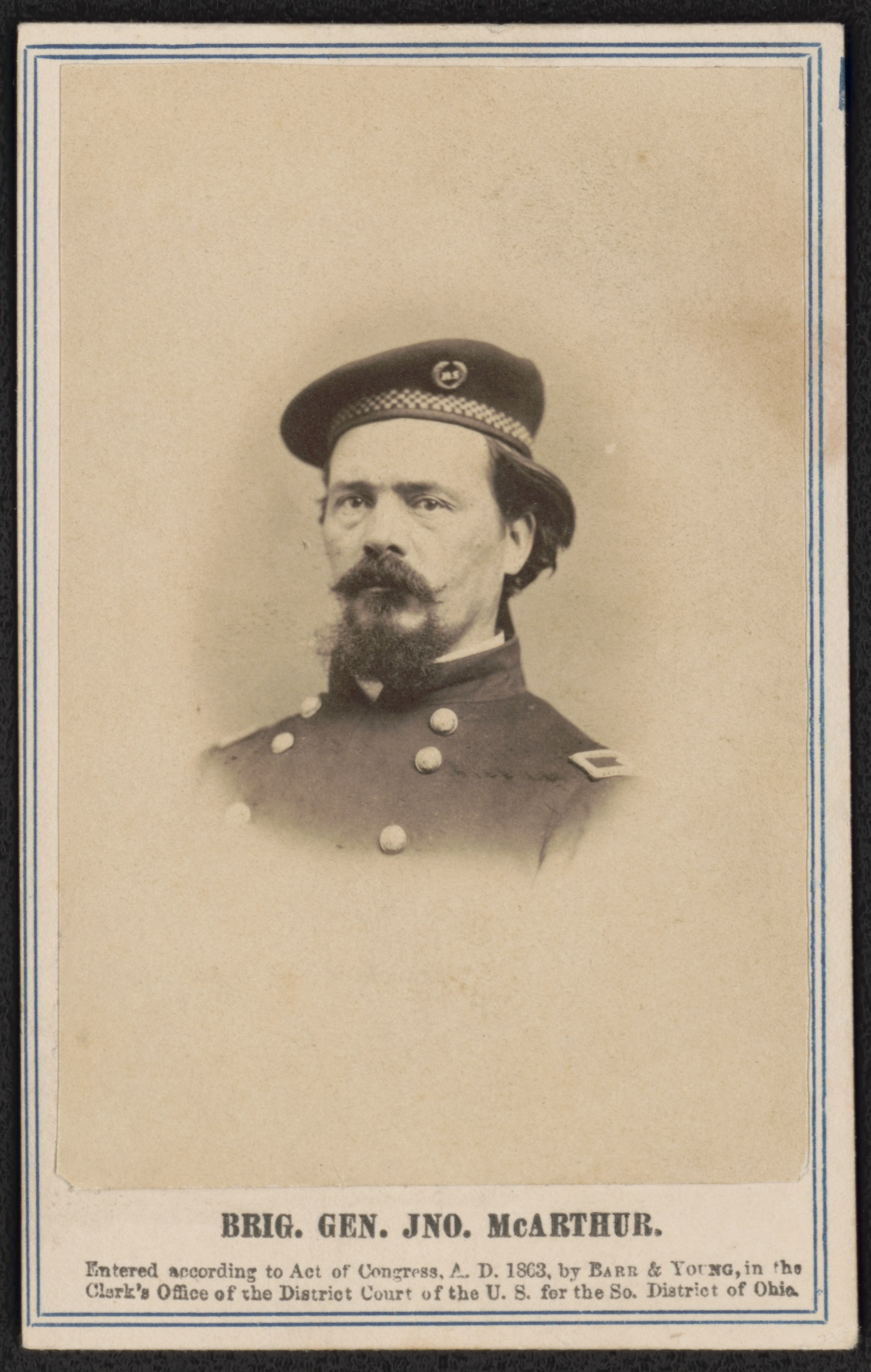
Brig. General John McArthur of 12th Illinois Infantry Regiment in uniform, who was wounded at Shiloh, Tennessee

The 12th Illinois Infantry Regiment, also known as the 1st Scotch Regiment, was an infantry regiment that served in the Union Army between May 2, 1861, and July 18, 1865, during the American Civil War. The regiment's initial 3-month service was spent performing guard duty and fatigue duty, and had also participated in an expedition to pursue M. Jeff Thompson and his forces at the swamps near Commerce, Missouri, but only a battalion, consisting of various detachments from different regiments, were deployed for the expedition. The regiment was mustered out on August 1, 1861, once its enlistment periods had ended.

Their 3 years service was spent fighting in the Western theater of the American Civil War, participating in major battles such as Fort Donelson, Shiloh, Corinth, Resaca, Atlanta, before participating in the March to the Sea, and finally concluding with the Battle of Bentonville. After the Civil War, the regiment participated in the Grand Review of the Armies before mustering out on July 18, 1865.

== Service ==
=== Initial 3-month service ===
The infantry regiment was organized at Springfield, Illinois, and mustered in on May 2, 1861, for a three-month service. Following its organization, it was transferred to Cairo, Illinois, where it conducted garrison duty alongside other regiments. The regiment's daily duties were primarily fatigue duty, such as constructing barracks, clearing parade grounds and building local defenses. Notably, the regiment assisted in constructing a redan earthwork at the confluence of the Ohio and Mississippi rivers, designed to defend against potential Confederate gunboats.

The only field operation the regiment conducted was an expedition to the swamps near Commerce, Missouri, to pursue Confederate forces under M. Jeff Thompson. A battalion of the regiment participated in this expedition alongside detachments from various regiments.

The regiment was mustered out of service on August 1, 1861. During their service, the regiment lost 4 men to disease

During their 3-Month service, the regiment wore grey coats with a blue trim.

=== 3-year service ===
The 12th Illinois Infantry was mustered into Federal service for a three-year enlistment on August 1, 1861, at Cairo, Illinois.Their uniform consisted blue frock coats and their headgear was the tam-o'-shanter

On September 5, 1861, alongside the 9th Illinois, the regiment moved to occupy Paducah, Kentucky, becoming the first Union troops to hold the city. Following the fall of Paducah, four companies were detached to conduct garrison duty at Smithland, Kentucky, remaining there until January 25, 1862. During this period, these four companies would participate in the Battle of Belmont.

=== Tennessee River Campaign ===
In February 1862, the 12th Illinois joined John McArthur's Brigade for the Battle of Fort Donelson. The regiment marched toward Fort Donelson, enduring the cold, hunger and fatigue. Despite enduring the severe winter and heavy combat on February 15th, it was praised for its "Noble" stand, suffering 82 casualties.

Following the surrender of the Fort, the regiment moved through Clarksville and Nashville. before embarking for Pittsburg Landing. During the Battle of Shiloh, the regiment was fully engaged for nearly the duration of the two-day battle.

==== Battle of Shiloh ====
On the morning of April 6, the regiment took up positions in a deep, heavily wooded ravine alongside the 9th and 50th Illinois Infantry Regiments. Ltc. Col. Augustus L. Chetlain, though suffering from illness at that time, he left his sickbed to command his regiment. Shortly after, the regiment was faced with sudden Confederate infantry and artillery fire from the ridge above. Chetlain was unhorsed having suffered severe bruises on his chest and face, but continued to command the 12th Illinois on foot, before he ordered a withdrawal to the ridge on the rear. As the Confederates continued their assault, the 12th Illinois fought a stubborn rearguard action, and eventually fell back with McArthur's Brigade near Wicker Field.

When Colonel Augustus Chetlain was injured during the first day, Major James R. Hugunin took command. The regiment suffered 116 casualties during the battle.

=== Siege and Battles of Corinth ===
Throughout the summer of 1862, the regiment took part in the Siege of Corinth, performing picket and fatigue duty, before participating in the subsequent pursuit of Confederate forces to Booneville.

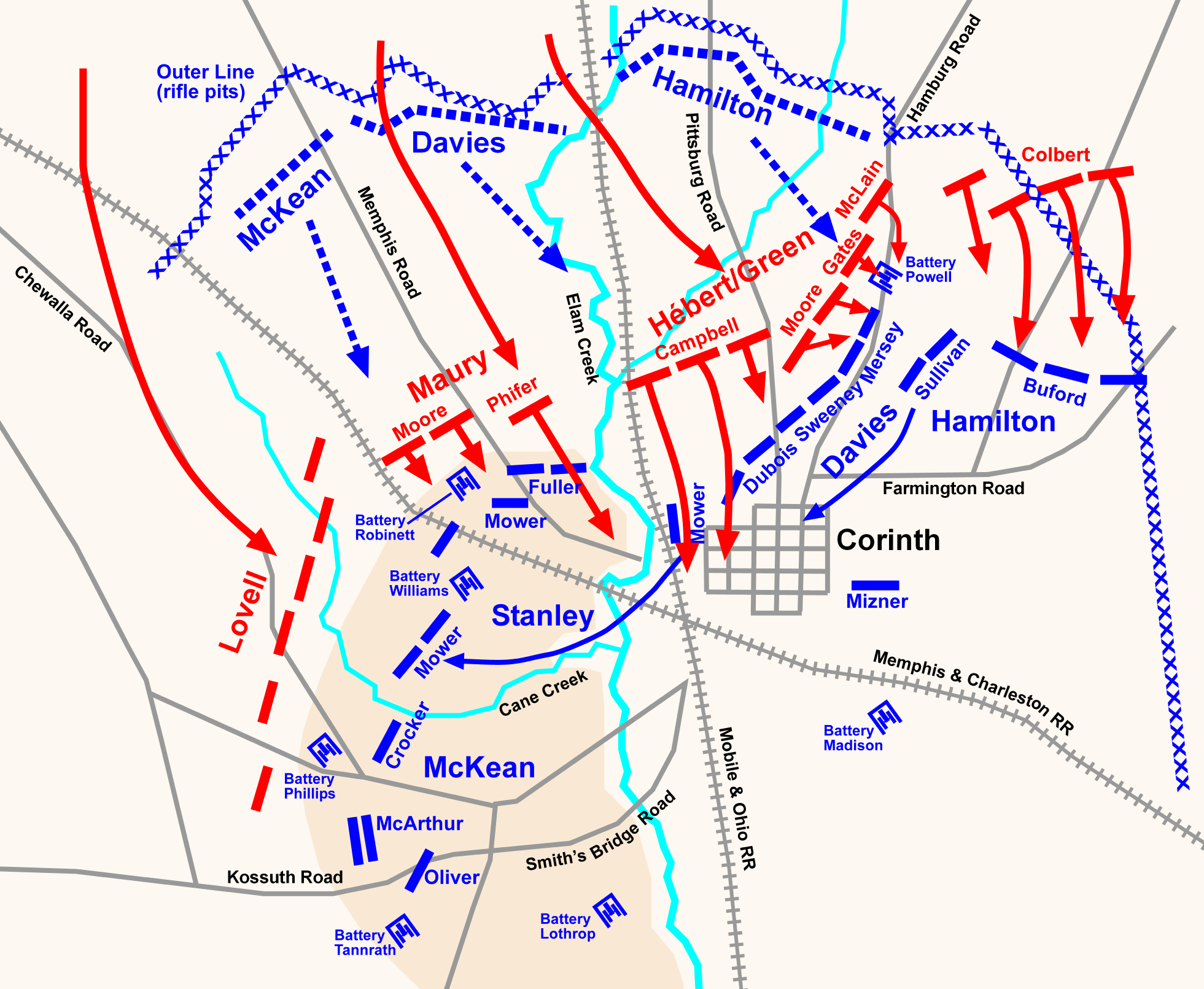
Second Battle of Corinth, Where the 12th Recaptured Powell's Battery

On October 3rd to October 4th 1862, the Regiment played a Role in the Second Battle of Corinth. During the Fighting on October 4, supported by elements of the 50th and 52nd Illinois, led a charge to recapture "Powell's Battery" from Confederate forces, capturing Confederate colors and driving the Confederates away in the process. This victory had come at a cost; the regiment suffered 112 casualties, alongside the Division the regiment was in lost half its men.

=== 1863 and Veteran Re-Enlistment ===
1863 was characterized by garrison duty and guarding railroads in Tennessee and Mississippi. In April, 1863, Confederate forces attacked the outpost of Glendale, which was 12 miles away from Corinth. The regiment was sent in as reinforcements, but before the regiment even reached the field, the attack had been repulsed and the regiment were ordered to return to Corinth. In December, Colonel Chetlain was Promoted to Brigadier General. on January 16, 1864, the majority of the regiment re-enlisted as Veterans, receiving a furlough to return to Illinois, heading for Camp Butler, for the 30-day furlough, before reorganizing at Camp Fry, Ohio.

=== Atlanta Campaign and March to the Sea ===
The Regiment returned to the front in March 1864. It took part in the Atlanta Campaign, it saw action at the Battle of Atlanta. After that, it was heavily engaged at the Battle of Allatoona, where it lost 57 out of its 161 engaged. in November, they joined the March to the Sea, moving through Georgia and to Savannah, alongside encountering minor Confederate resistance, during the march, they captured a British-made "Blakely Rifle" near the Ogeechee canal, and was eventually sent to guard prisoners at Fort McAllister.

=== Carolinas Campaign ===
In early 1865, the regiment marched through the Carolinas, covering 600 miles from Savannah to Goldsboro, North Carolina. they participated in pursuing General Joseph E. Johnston's Army of the South, fighting at the Battle of Bentonville, losing 2 men wounded, until its Surrender at Bennett Place.

After the end of the war, the Regiment marched through Virginia and to Washington DC, to participate in the Grand Review of the Armies on May 24, 1865.

The regiment was mustered out on July 18, 1865, at Louisville, Kentucky and was disbanded at Camp Butler, Illinois.

== Regimental organization ==
=== 3-month service ===
- Company A: Cook County -- Captain Joseph Kellogg
- Company B: LaSalle County -- Captain Phineas B. Rusk
- Company C: Vermilion County -- Captain Samuel Frazier
- Company D: Rock Island County -- Captain David Benson & William D. Williams (Promoted to Major)
- Company E: Edgar County -- Captain Vincent Ridgely
- Company F: Jo Daviess County --
- Company G: Perry County
- Company H: Bureau County
- Company I: Bureau County
- Company K: Cook & Sangamon counties

== Total strength and casualties ==
The regiment suffered 5 officers and 143 enlisted men killed in action or mortally wounded, and 3 officers and 109 enlisted men who died of disease, for a total of 260 fatalities.

== Flags ==
The Regiment was given a stand of colors by the Scottish people of Chicago in November of 1861. One of them was a National flag made of silk that measured 6 x 6 feet. The regimental flag bore a blue field containing the coat of arms of the Nation in gold, underneath it was the name and number of the regiment.

They also carried a silk sallowtail-guide flag with a white field and on it was the inscription: "Dinna ye hear the slogan?" on top and "'Tis McArthur and his men" below.

== Commanders ==
- Colonel John McArthur – promoted to brigadier general on May 1, 1862.
- Colonel Augustus L. Chetlain – promoted to brigadier general on December 19, 1863.
- Lieutenant Colonel Henry Van Sellars – mustered out with the regiment.
- Captain Duncan MacLean, of McLean County – promoted to major on January 22, 1862.

== See also ==
- List of Illinois Civil War units
- Illinois in the American Civil War
- 65th Illinois Volunteer Infantry Regiment, "The Second Scotch Regiment"
