= Louisa F. Goodwin =

Librarian (c.1832 – 1911)

- Born: July 21, 1832 or 1833; Waterville, Maine, US
- Died: October 11, 1911; Los Angeles, California, US
- Years active: 1865–1867
- Employer: Minnesota State Library
- Spouses: James Goodwin (September 29, 1856 – April 18, 1863); William S. Jones (m. December 3, 1866)
- Children: 1

Louisa F. Goodwin (July 21, 1832 or 1833 – October 11, 1911) was an American librarian and the first woman to serve in a state librarian position.

== Early life ==
Born to parents Cyrus and Fidelia Williams in Waterville, Maine, Louisa was one of at least seven children. Her father owned an inn in Waterville, and she lived in the town until her marriage in 1856. She met farmer James A. Goodwin, who had moved to Minnesota to start his farming career. The two married on September 29, 1856, and he returned to Maine to bring her to Owatonna, Minnesota, to start a family. The couple had a daughter, Helen May, on April 14, 1861.

== Civil War ==
Minnesota was the first state to send troops to fight for the Union cause during the Civil War. Among some of the first men to enlist, James Goodwin joined Company E of the 4th Minnesota on October 1, 1861. Unfortunately, a bullet wound to his leg caused Goodwin to break his femur at the Battle of Iuka, Mississippi, on September 19, 1862. The army discharged Goodwin on February 25, 1863, after doctors amputated his leg. He died on April 18, 1863, in a hospital in St. Louis, Missouri. In 1863, Louisa briefly returned to Maine to stay with her family. However, she returned to Minnesota to begin her appointment as the State Librarian of Minnesota by March 1865.

== State Librarian position ==
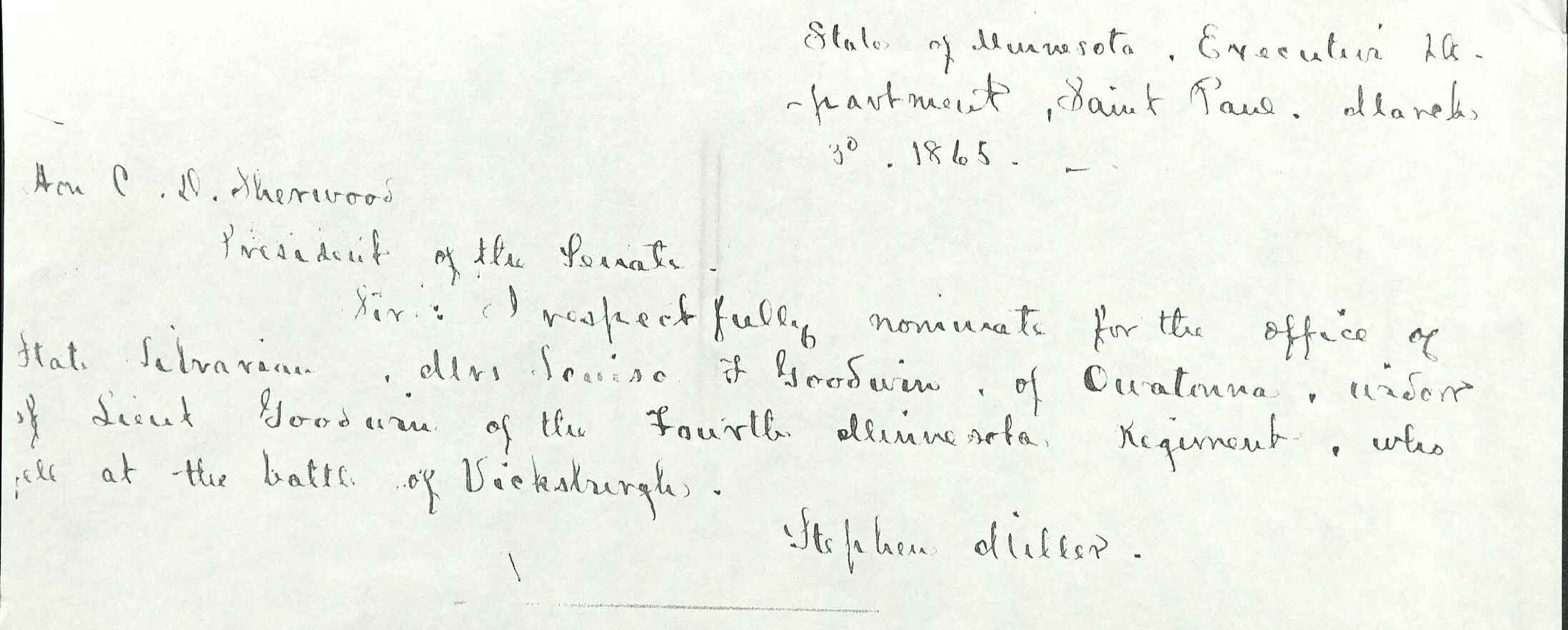
Letter from Governor Stephen Miller to the Minnesota State Senate nominating Louisa F. Goodwin to the position of State Librarian

After a nomination by Governor Stephen Miller, the Minnesota State Senate approved Goodwin's appointment as the State Librarian. Goodwin was not Governor Miller's first choice for the role; he originally nominated his Executive Private Secretary, George H. Oakes, for the role on March 1, 1865. The State Senate rejected this nomination the next day, despite Oakes performing the duties of State Librarian since December 1864. Governor Miller nominated Goodwin on March 3, 1865, and the State Senate approved her position the same day.

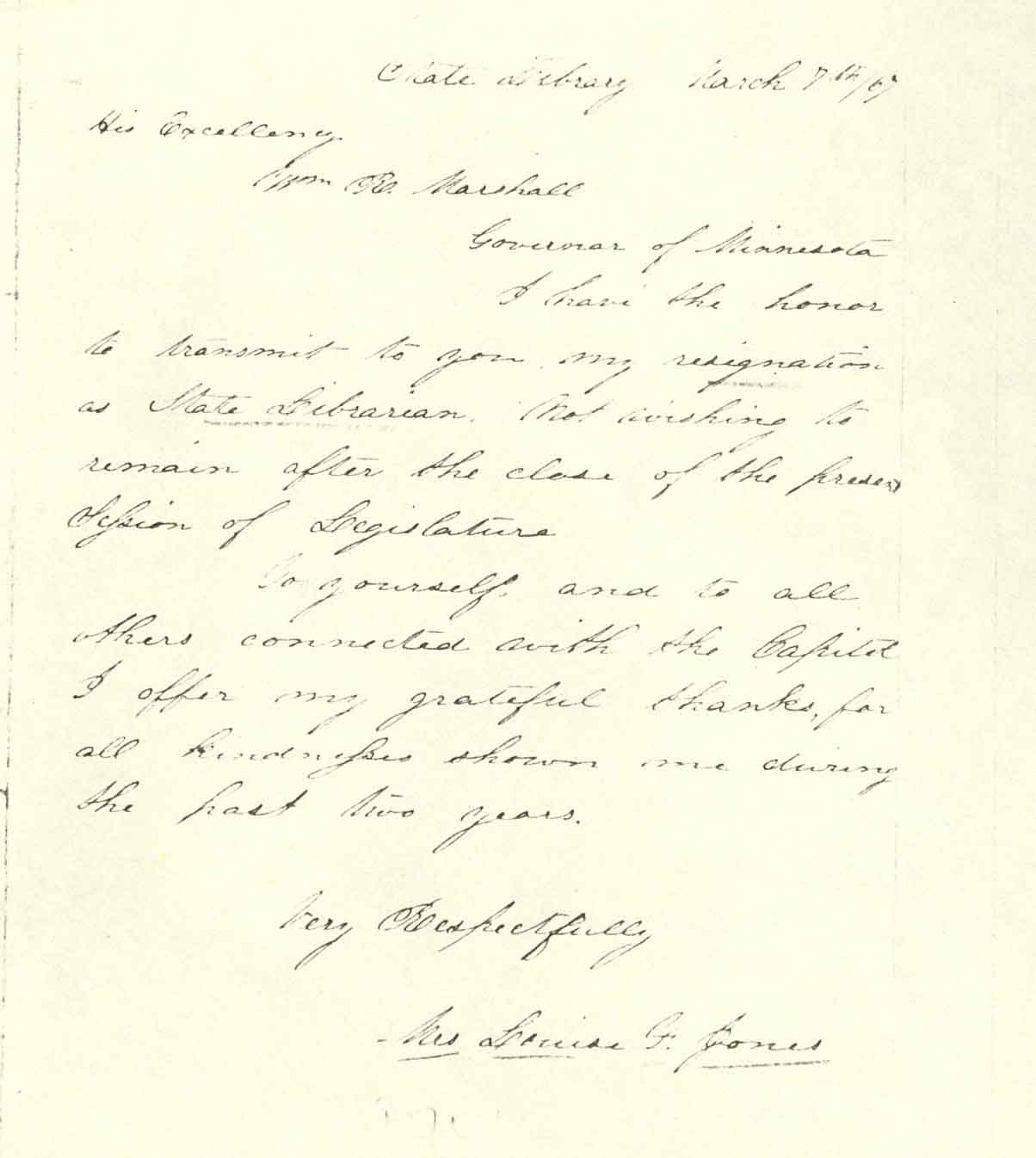
Resignation letter of Louisa G. Jones (Goodwin) from her position of State Librarian

Goodwin served as the State Librarian from 1865 to 1867. Her salary was $400 a year, $200 less than her male counterparts. During her tenure, Goodwin penned two Annual Reports to the Minnesota State Legislature, where she requested additional funding “for the preparation and printing of a new catalog, the binding of old state newspapers which the State Library receives free of charge, and for the acquisition of individual volumes to complete sets of judicial reports received from most of the States.” Her 1867 Annual Report revealed that, although the State Senate had appropriated some additional funds, there was still a need to continue this increase to ensure the library functioned correctly. The library could only maintain the current collection, but not grow it. Goodwin also noted that the library had several miscellaneous materials with very few complete sets and no new materials.

During her term, Goodwin also remarried. She wed William S. Jones on December 3, 1866, and changed her name to Louisa Jones. She resigned from her role as State Librarian in March 1867, and she and William returned to Owatonna to reunite with her daughter, Helen.

== Later life ==
After her resignation, Louisa lived in Owatonna. Helen moved to Illinois in 1873 to live with a different guardian, but returned to Minnesota in 1875. By this time, Louisa had also changed her name back to Goodwin. The mother and daughter moved to California, where they worked as dressmakers.

Louisa died on October 11, 1911, in Los Angeles, from multiple organ failure. She had spent the last ten years of her life living in the Hollenbeck Home, the city's first nursing home for the elderly poor.

== Legacy ==
Despite her role as the first female state librarian, there is little literature about Goodwin. Even her initial appointment in 1865 went without notice, with only one newspaper article reporting on her achievement. The Minnesota State Law Library is currently the only repository with notable information about her life.
