= John E. Smith (general) =

Swiss-American army officer (1816–1897)

John Eugene Smith
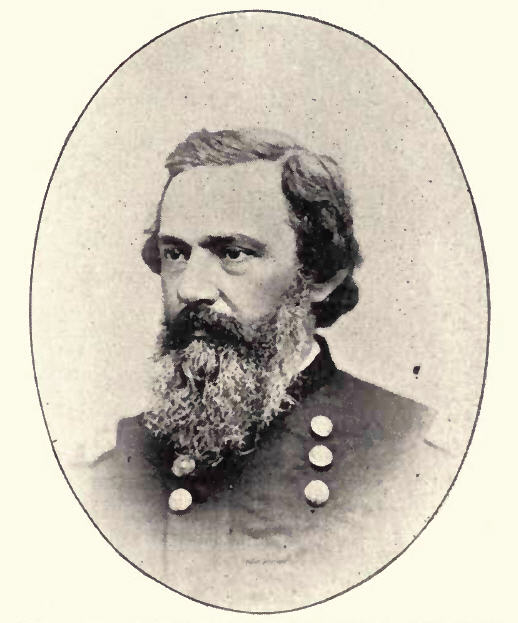
- John E. Smith
- Born: August 3, 1816; Bern, Switzerland
- Died: January 29, 1897 (aged 80); Chicago, Illinois, United States
- Burial place: Greenwood Cemetery, Galena, Illinois
- Military career
- Allegiance: Switzerland (formerly); United States of America; Union
- Branch: United States Army; Union Army
- Service years: 1861–1881
- Rank: Brigadier General; Brevet Major General
- Commands: 45th Illinois Volunteer Infantry; 27th Infantry Regiment
- Conflicts: American Civil War; Battle of Fort Henry; Battle of Fort Donelson; Battle of Shiloh; Vicksburg Campaign; Battle of Chattanooga; Atlanta campaign; March to the Sea; Carolinas campaign
- Other work: jeweler, goldsmith

John Eugene Smith (1816–1897) was a Swiss immigrant to the United States, who served as a Union general during the American Civil War.

== Early life ==
Smith was born in Bern, Switzerland, in 1816. His father had served under Napoleon Bonaparte and emigrated with his family to Philadelphia, Pennsylvania after the emperor's downfall. In Philadelphia, Smith was educated to be a jeweler and 20 years later settled in Galena, Illinois, where he practiced his jewelry trade. Smith was one of nine residents of Galena who would eventually become generals fighting for the Union during the Civil War. The other eight were: Augustus L. Chetlain, John O. Duer, Ulysses S. Grant, Jasper A. Maltby, Ely S. Parker, John A. Rawlins, William R. Rowley and John Corson Smith.

== Civil War ==
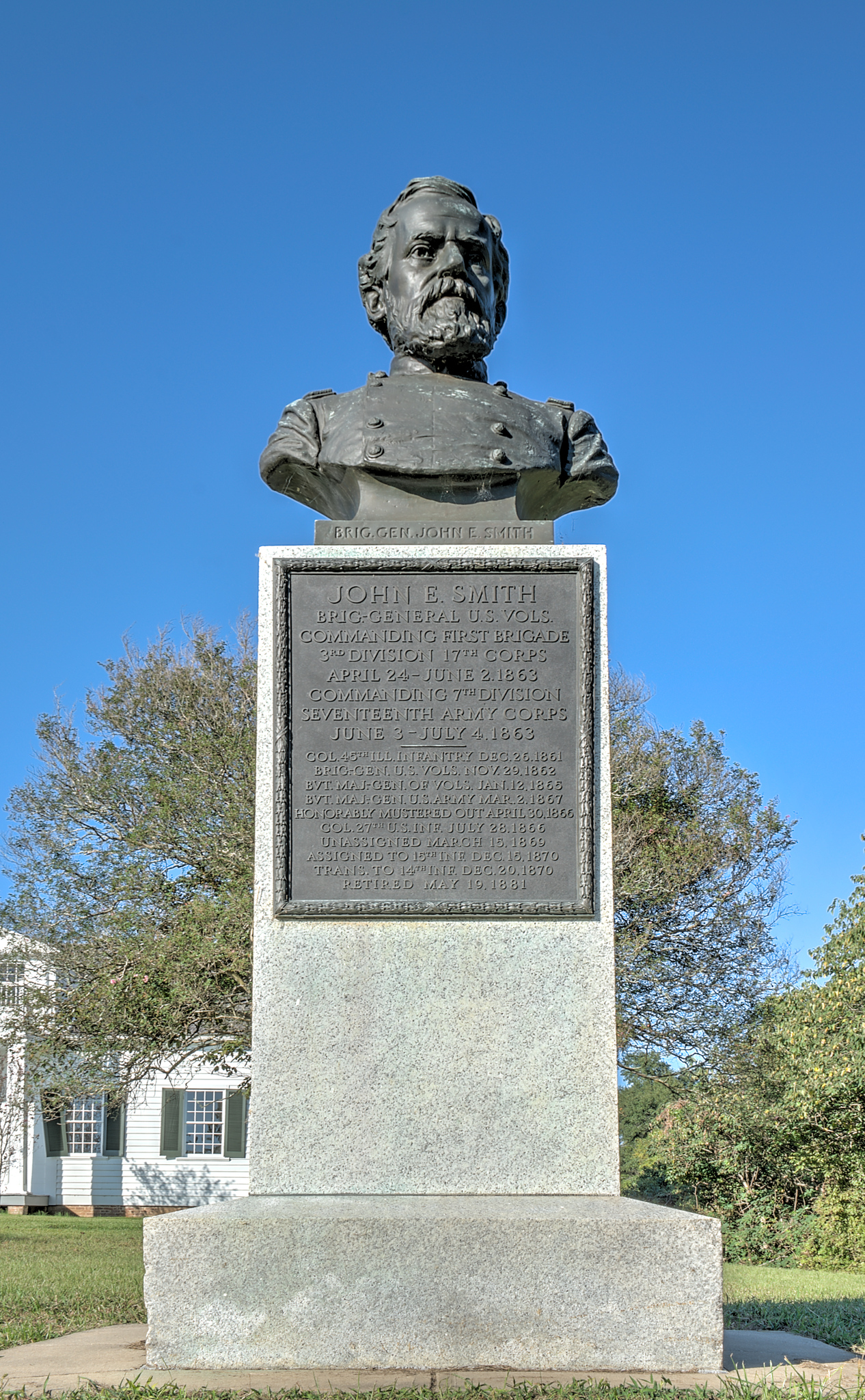
Statue by George E. Ganiere at Vicksburg National Military Park

When the Civil War began in 1861, Smith served as an aide de camp to Illinois Governor Richard Yates. On December 26, 1861, he was appointed colonel of the 45th Illinois Volunteer Infantry Regiment, with the rank backdated to July 23, 1861, to replace the previous Colonel who resigned his state Commission when the regiment entered Federal service. He led his regiment at the battles of Fort Henry, Fort Donelson and Shiloh. On November 29, 1862, he was promoted to brigadier general of U.S. Volunteers. He briefly commanded a brigade before taking command of the 8th Division, XVI Corps. When Ulysses S. Grant began his final campaign against Vicksburg, Smith was placed in command of the 1st Brigade, 3rd Division, XVII Corps. He fought at the battles of Port Gibson, Raymond, Champion Hill and in the assaults on Vicksburg. In June, 1863 in the midst of the siege of Vicksburg, Smith was chosen to replace Gen. Isaac F. Quinby in command of the 7th Division, XVII Corps after Quinby became ill and took a leave of absence. In September, 1863 Smith was transferred to command the 2nd Division, XVII Corps and his division was sent with William T. Sherman to aid in the relief of Chattanooga. During the battle of Missionary Ridge, Smith took part in the attacks against the Confederate right flank at Tunnel Hill.

In December, 1863 Smith took command of the 3rd Division, XV Corps which he would command until the end of the war. He saw action during the Atlanta campaign, March to the Sea and the Carolinas campaign.

== Later life ==
In 1866 General Smith was mustered out of the volunteer service, but chose to stay in the regular army. He was appointed colonel of the 27th U.S. Infantry Regiment. He received a promotion to brigadier general in 1867 and a brevet promotion to major general in 1869.

During this time, General Smith served along the frontier. He was posted to command Fort Phil Kearney (following the Kearny Massacre in 1868), and played a vital role in renewing peaceful negotiations with Red Cloud and in overseeing the removal of troops from Fort Phil Kearney. He is described as "A favorite of Red Cloud's...[and] respected among the Sioux Indians." Afterwards he was chosen by Red Cloud to accompany the 1870 Sioux delegation to Washington, where he was photographed (along with other delegates) by famous documentary photographer Mathew Brady.

He retired from the army in 1881.

Smith resided in Chicago, Illinois during his final years of life and died there on January 29, 1897. He is buried in Galena.

== See also ==
- List of American Civil War generals (Union)
- Bibliography of the American Civil War
- Bibliography of Abraham Lincoln
- Bibliography of Ulysses S. Grant
