= James C. Edson =

American judge and politician (1825–1891)

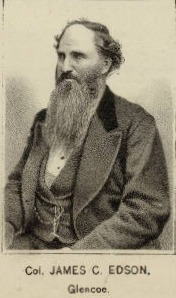
- James C. Edson in 1874

Member of the Minnesota Legislature from the 36th district
- In office January 8, 1878 - January 6, 1879
- Governor: John S. Pillsbury

Judge of the 8th District Court of Minnesota
- Governor: Lucius Frederick Hubbard; Andrew Ryan McGill
- Preceded by: John L. MacDonald
- Succeeded by: Francis Cadwell

Personal details
- Born: February 25, 1825 Edson's Corner; Milford, New York, U.S.
- Died: January 27, 1891 (aged 65) Glencoe, Minnesota, U.S.
- Resting place: Hillcrest Cemetery; Glencoe, Minnesota, U.S.
- Party: Republican
- Spouse(s): Sarah Ann Richards; Susan McFeeley
- Children: 4
- Education: State and National Law School
- Occupation: Lawyer; Judge; Hotel Manager
- Profession: Law

Military service
- Allegiance: United States of America; Union
- Branch/service: (United States) Union Army
- Years of service: 1861-1865
- Rank: Brevet Colonel
- Unit: 4th Minnesota Infantry Regiment
- Commands: Company B, 4th Minnesota Infantry Regiment
- Battles/wars: American Civil War

James C. Edson (February 25, 1825 - January 27, 1891) was a lawyer, judge, military officer, politician, hotelier, and settler of Glencoe, Minnesota. He served as the county judge of McLeod County, Minnesota, and was Judge of the 8th District Court of Minnesota under Governor of Minnesota Andrew Ryan McGill.

== Early life ==
James C. Edson was born on February 25, 1825, at Edson's Corner (sometimes written as Edsons Corner) near the modern-day city of Milford, New York. He was the son of Jacob Edson and Sophronia Bowen, and was the eldest of five children. He grew up as a farmer and was trained as an apprentice carpenter and millwright. In 1845, at the age of 20, Edson moved to Plainville, Wisconsin (now Dell Prairie) where he farmed for a few years. He moved to Newport, Wisconsin and worked for the law firm of Jonathan Bowman near Kilbourn City (now the Wisconsin Dells). Edson was admitted to bar in Wisconsin in 1855 and was allowed to practice law in Adams County. He later returned to New York and studied law at the State and National Law School in Poughkeepsie, New York for two years.

Following his study in Poughkeepsie, Edson moved to the new state of Minnesota in 1860, originally settling in Garden City before moving to Glencoe in McLeod County in August of that year. While in Glencoe Edson began a small law practice.

== Military career ==
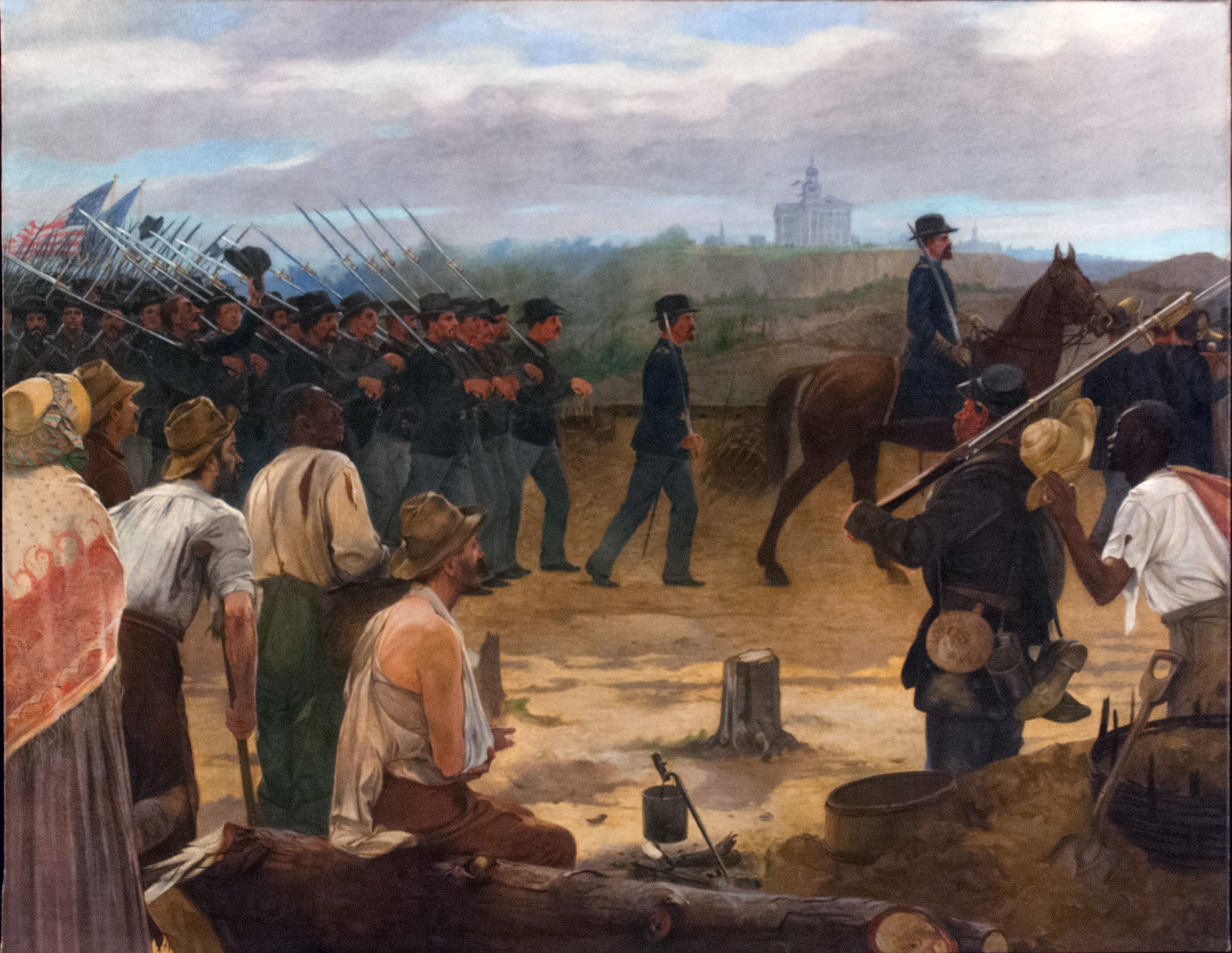
The Fourth Minnesota Entering Vicksburg, c. 1904 by Francis Davis Millet

At the outbreak of the American Civil War, Edson helped start Company B - nicknamed the "McLeod County Guards" of the 4th Minnesota Infantry Regiment. Company B was organized on September 26, 1861 in Glencoe and marched to Fort Snelling to join the rest of the regiment. The majority of Company B were from McLeod County while many of the rest came from southern Meeker County, Minnesota. Edson was quickly elected as the Captain of Company B and would serve with the unit for the whole of the war. The 4th Minnesota fought exclusively in the Western theater of the American Civil War, most notably in the Shiloh campaign, the Iuka-Corinth campaign, the Vicksburg campaign, the Chattanooga campaign, Sherman's March to the Sea, and the Carolinas campaign.

During the Second Battle of Corinth Edson was appointed as the acting rank of Major of the regiment despite being officially only a Captain. He re-enlisted in the 4th Minnesota on August 6, 1863 when his original 3-year enlistment expired. Edson was formally promoted to the rank of Major on February 11, 1864. On September 1, 1864, He was promoted to the rank of Lieutenant Colonel shortly before the Battle of Allatoona. He was mustered out of service with the rest of the regiment on July 19, 1865 in Saint Paul, Minnesota. For his gallantry and continued service through the war, Edson received the Brevet rank of Colonel.

== Law, business, and political career ==
Following the war, Edson continued his law practice in Glencoe and was eventually elected to the office of County Judge for McLeod County. In 1877 he ran for political office as a Republican for the 36th District of the Minnesota Legislature representing McLeod and Sibley counties. Edson won the election on November 6, 1878 and would serve in the 20th Minnesota Legislature during the 1878 regular session. During the 20th Legislature Edson served on the Deaf and Dumb, and Blind Institute committee, the military affairs committee, and the Minnesota State Prison committee.

In 1881 Edson constructed Glencoe's "American Hotel", also called the "American House", using lumber sourced from Red Wing, Minnesota. He added on to the hotel in 1885 and supervised its operation until his death in 1891. The hotel was later converted into a hatchery and named "Walker Acres"; the building was razed in 1988.

Edson was appointed by the Governor of Minnesota Lucius Frederick Hubbard to serve as the Judge of the 8th District Court of Minnesota in 1886. The 8th Judicial District was created by an act of the Minnesota Legislature approved March 5, 1870. His predecessor was John L. MacDonald who had vacated the position due to being elected to the 50th United States Congress. Edson was elected as the Judge of the 8th Judicial District in 1888 and served under Governor Andrew Ryan McGill. Edson died in office in 1891; his successor was Francis Cadwell of Le Sueur County, Minnesota.

Edson was the county deputy for the McLeod County chapter of The National Grange of the Order of Patrons of Husbandry, an American agricultural advocacy group which promoted the livelihood and interests of farmers. He was also the President of the Fourth Minnesota Veteran Volunteer Infantry Association, a Veterans' organization similar to the Grand Army of the Republic which held annual reunions in Minneapolis.

== Personal life and death ==
Edson was married twice; his first wife was Sarah Ann Richards of Binghamton, New York, his second was Susan McFeeley. His grandson via his eldest son James Richards Edson (1862–1935) was Vice Admiral Stephen Reuben Edson (1895–1969) who served in World War I and World War II. Edson's daughter Ella Mariah Edson (1866–1942) married Captain Julius Jules Durage (1839–1911), a Dagestani soldier who served with the 11th Infantry Regiment in the Indian Wars.

Edson died on January 27, 1891 at the age of 65 of Bright's disease (a historical classification for kidney disease). He is buried at the Hillcrest Cemetery in Glencoe alongside his first wife Sarah.
