= Battle of Raymond order of battle: Confederate =

Order of battle

The following Confederate Army units and commanders fought in the Battle of Raymond; the Union order of battle is listed separately.

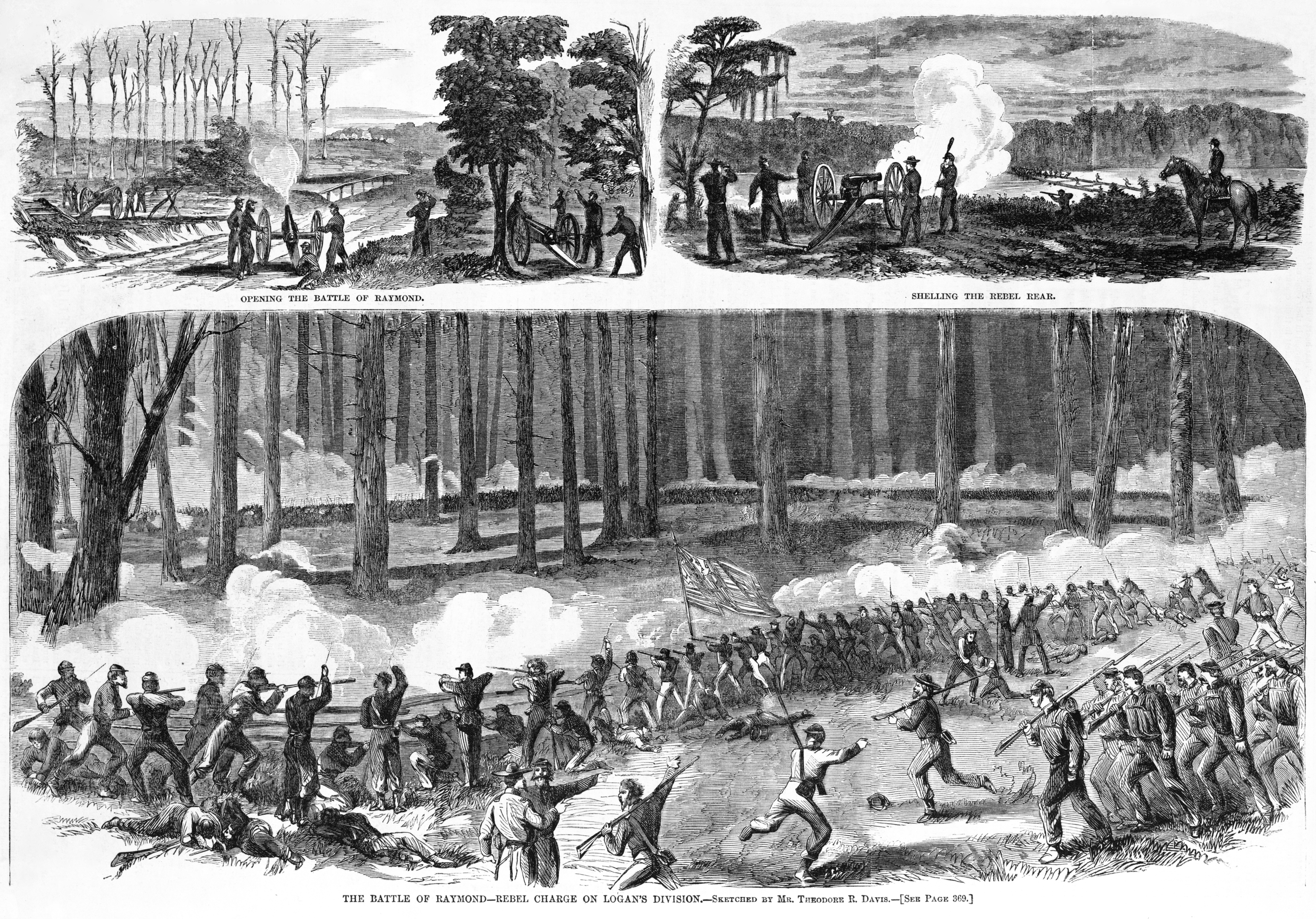
Union charge at the Battle of Raymond

Major General Ulysses S. Grant of the Union Army landed 24,000 men at Bruinsburg, Mississippi, on April 30, 1863, as part of the Vicksburg campaign, an operation intended to capture the important Mississippi River city of Vicksburg, Mississippi. On May 1, his men having driven east from the river, the Grant's men defeated the Confederates at the Battle of Port Gibson. After Port Gibson, Grant could choose to either attack Vicksburg from the south, or to march further to the east and then turn around and move west against the city. He decided upon the latter, as it gave greater prospects of capturing the Confederate army defending Vicksburg, in addition to the city itself.

As part of his movement to the east, Grant sent Major General James B. McPherson's corps in the direction of Raymond, Mississippi. Meanwhile, a Confederate brigade commanded by Brigadier General John Gregg, moved into Raymond on May 11. The next day, the two sides made contact southwest of Raymond along Fourteenmile Creek. Gregg did not realize he was outnumbered, and fought aggressively, attacking part of the Union line. Eventually, Union reinforcements arrived on the scene, and Gregg's left flank was driven back. The Confederates then broke off the fighting and fell back to Jackson, Mississippi, reaching their destination on May 13. McPherson's men suffered 442 casualties, while the Confederates suffered 514 men killed, wounded, or missing.

Gregg's command consisted of his brigade of infantrymen from Texas and Tennessee, as well as Bledsoe's Missouri Battery, an artillery unit. During the battle, Colonel Cyrus A. Sugg commanded the brigade itself, while Gregg was in overall command on the field. The Confederate force was also supplemented two by small cavalry units. Colonel A. P. Thompson's unit of mounted infantry from Kentucky reinforced Gregg after the fighting ended, and 1,000 men commanded by Brigadier General W. H. T. Walker arrived during the retreat. Modern historians disagree as to the number of Confederate troops actually present during the fighting. Shelby Foote gives a Confederate strength of 4,000 men, Donald L. Miller places Gregg's strength at 3,200 men, Edwin C. Bearss gives 3,000, and Christopher Losson provides a range of 2,500 to 3,000 men.

== Abbreviations used ==
=== Military rank ===
- BG = Brigadier general
- Col = Colonel
- Ltc = Lieutenant colonel
- Maj = Major
- Cpt = Captain

=== Other ===
- k = Killed
- w = Wounded

== Confederate forces ==
=== Gregg's Task Force ===
BG John Gregg

| Units | Component units | Strengths and losses |
|---|---|---|
| Gregg's Brigade: Col Cyrus A. Sugg | 3rd Tennessee Infantry Regiment: Col Calvin H. Walker | Unknown strength, 187 casualties |
| Gregg's Brigade: Col Cyrus A. Sugg | 10th and 30th Tennessee Infantry Regiment (Consolidated): Col Randal William McGavock (k), Ltc J. J. Turner | Unknown strength, 78 casualties |
| Gregg's Brigade: Col Cyrus A. Sugg | 41st Tennessee Infantry Regiment: Col Robert Farquharson | Unknown strength, 23 casualties |
| Gregg's Brigade: Col Cyrus A. Sugg | 50th Tennessee Infantry Regiment: Ltc Thomas W. Beaumont (w) | Unknown strength, 16 casualties |
| Gregg's Brigade: Col Cyrus A. Sugg | 1st Tennessee Infantry Battalion: Maj Stephen H. Colms | Unknown strength, 42 casualties |
| Gregg's Brigade: Col Cyrus A. Sugg | 7th Texas Infantry Regiment: Col Hiram B. Granbury | Strength of 306; 158 casualties |
| Attached units | Bledsoe's Missouri Battery (3 guns) (Note: One of the guns was destroyed during the fighting.): Cpt Hiram M. Bledsoe | Unknown |
| Attached units | Cavalry Squadron: Cpt William S. Yerger | Strength of 50; unknown casualties |
| Attached units | 1st Mississippi Infantry Battalion State Troops (Mounted): Cpt J. M. Hall | Strength of 40, unknown casualties |
| Attached units | 3rd Kentucky Mounted Infantry: Col A. P. Thompson (Note: Arrived after the end of the battle.) | Unknown |

== See also ==
- Mississippi in the American Civil War

== Sources ==
- Ballard, Michael B. (2004). Vicksburg: The Campaign that Opened the Mississippi. Chapel Hill, North Carolina: University of North Carolina Press. ISBN 0-8078-2893-9.
- Buel, Clarence Clough; Johnson, Robert Underwood, eds. (1888). Battles and Leaders of the Civil War. Vol. 3. New York: The Century Co. OCLC 646675.
- Bearss, Edwin C. (1998). "Port Gibson, Mississippi". In Kennedy, Frances H. (ed.). The Civil War Battlefield Guide (2nd ed.). Boston/New York: Houghton Mifflin. pp. 158–164. ISBN 978-0-395-74012-5.
- Bearss, Edwin C. (1998). "Raymond, Mississippi". In Kennedy, Frances H. (ed.). The Civil War Battlefield Guide (2nd ed.). Boston/New York: Houghton Mifflin. pp. 164–167. ISBN 978-0-395-74012-5.
- Bearss, Edwin C. (2007) [2006]. Fields of Honor. Washington, D.C.: National Geographic. ISBN 978-1-4262-0093-9.
- Foote, Shelby (1995) [1963]. The Beleaguered City: The Vicksburg Campaign (Modern Library ed.). New York: The Modern Library. ISBN 0-679-60170-8.
- Kennedy, Frances H., ed. (1998). The Civil War Battlefield Guide (2nd ed.). Boston/New York: Houghton Mifflin. ISBN 978-0-395-74012-5.
- Miller, Donald L. (2019). Vicksburg: Grant's Campaign that Broke the Confederacy. New York, New York: Simon and Schuster. ISBN 978-1-4516-4139-4.
- Official Records of the War of the Rebellion. Vol. 24. Washington, D. C.: Government Printing Office. 1889. OCLC 427057.
- Welcher, Frank Johnson (1989). The Union Army, 1861-1865: The Western Theater. Bloomington, Indiana: Indiana University Press. ISBN 978-0-2533-6454-8.
