= Greenwood Cemetery (Galena, Illinois) =

Cemetery in Jo Daviess County, Illinois

- Interactive map of Greenwood Cemetery

Details
- Location: Galena, Illinois
- Country: United States
- Coordinates: 42°25′03″N 90°26′42″W
- No. of graves: >8,000
- Find a Grave: Greenwood Cemetery

Greenwood Cemetery is a public cemetery in West Galena Township in the city of Galena, Illinois. It is located one mile west of downtown Galena at the intersection of US 20 (Ulysses S. Grant Memorial Highway) and Gear Street.

Greenwood Cemetery interments include United States Civil War veterans and casualties along with a number of staff members from President Ulysses S. Grant's administration. Greenwood is an active cemetery and is open to the public.

== Notable interments ==
Notable interments include

- Leo E. Allen
- Augustus Louis Chetlain
- Charles S. Hempstead
- Jasper A. Maltby
- Robert H. McClellan
- William R. Rowley
- John Corson Smith
- John Eugene Smith
- Elihu B. Washburne
