= West Galena Township, Jo Daviess County, Illinois =

West Galena Township
- Township
- Location in Jo Daviess County

- Jo Daviess County's location in Illinois
- Coordinates: 42°24′16″N 90°27′33″W
- Country: United States
- State: Illinois
- County: Jo Daviess
- Established: November 2, 1852

Government
  - Supervisor: Charles Quick

Area
  - Total: 11.46 sq mi (29.7 km^{2})
  - Land: 9.61 sq mi (24.9 km^{2})
  - Water: 1.85 sq mi (4.8 km^{2}) 16.13%
- Elevation: 725 ft (221 m)

Population (2020)
  - Total: 3,230
  - Density: 336/sq mi (130/km^{2})
- Time zone: UTC-6 (CST)
  - Summer (DST): UTC-5 (CDT)
- ZIP codes: 61025, 61036
- FIPS code: 17-085-80359

West Galena Township is one of 23 townships in Jo Daviess County, Illinois, United States. As of the 2020 census, its population was 3,230 and it contained 1,912 housing units.

== Geography ==
According to the 2021 census gazetteer files, West Galena Township has a total area of 11.46 square miles (29.68 km^{2}), of which 9.61 square miles (24.89 km^{2}) (or 83.87%) is land and 1.85 square miles (4.79 km^{2}) (or 16.13%) is water.

=== Cities, towns, villages ===
- Galena (east three-quarters)

=== Cemeteries ===
The township contains two cemeteries: Greenwood Cemetery and Saint Mary's.

=== Major highways ===
- U.S. Route 20
- Illinois Route 84

=== Rivers ===
- Mississippi River

== Demographics ==
As of the 2020 census there were 3,230 people, 1,585 households, and 823 families residing in the township. The population density was 281.92 inhabitants per square mile (108.85/km^{2}). There were 1,912 housing units at an average density of 166.88 per square mile (64.43/km^{2}). The racial makeup of the township was 88.39% White, 0.71% African American, 0.43% Native American, 0.71% Asian, 0.00% Pacific Islander, 4.15% from other races, and 5.60% from two or more races. Hispanic or Latino people of any race were 10.22% of the population.

There were 1,585 households, out of which 15.60% had children under the age of 18 living with them, 45.36% were married couples living together, 6.56% had a female householder with no spouse present, and 48.08% were non-families. 41.20% of all households were made up of individuals, and 19.80% had someone living alone who was 65 years of age or older. The average household size was 1.91 and the average family size was 2.68.

The township's age distribution consisted of 18.3% under the age of 18, 7.6% from 18 to 24, 19% from 25 to 44, 26.3% from 45 to 64, and 28.8% who were 65 years of age or older. The median age was 52.7 years. For every 100 females, there were 87.9 males. For every 100 females age 18 and over, there were 80.2 males.

The median income for a household in the township was $53,063, and the median income for a family was $74,877. Males had a median income of $41,920 versus $27,583 for females. The per capita income for the township was $40,668. About 0.0% of families and 7.2% of the population were below the poverty line, including 0.0% of those under age 18 and 14.0% of those age 65 or over.

Historical population
Census	Pop.	Note	%±
2000	3,279		—
2010	3,323		1.3%
2020	3,230		−2.8%
U.S. Decennial Census

== School districts ==
- Galena Unit School District 120

== Political districts ==
- Illinois' 16th congressional district
- State House District 89
- State Senate District 45
