= Robert H. McClellan =

American politician

Member of the Illinois Senate from the 10th district
- In office 1876 – 1880
- Preceded by: Henry Green
- Succeeded by: David H. Sunderland

Member of the Illinois House of Representatives from the 51st district
- In office 1860 – 1862
- Succeeded by: J. Russell Jones

Personal details
- Born: January 3, 1823 Washington County, New York
- Died: July 23, 1902 (aged 79)
- Party: Republican
- Profession: Attorney

Robert Hugh McClellan (January 3, 1823 – July 23, 1902) was an American politician, attorney, and banker from New York City. McClellan attended private schools and Union College before heading west to Galena, Illinois to practice law. There, he became the president of a bank and director of a woolen mill. He was elected as a Republican to a term in the Illinois House of Representatives in 1860 and then to the Illinois Senate, where he served two terms, in 1876.

== Biography ==
Robert Hugh McClellan was born in Washington County, New York, on January 3, 1823, to Col. William and Margaret (Randles) McClellan. McClellan attended Argyle Academy and Cambridge Academy while spending summers helping on the family farm. He attended Union College and graduated in 1847. He then studied law under future U.S. Representative Martin I. Townsend. He was admitted to the bar in December 1850. McClellan decided to move west to practice, settling in Galena, Illinois. He edited the Galena Gazette and formed a law practice with John M. Douglas.

McClellan became president of the Bank of Galena, later known as the National Bank of Galena, in January 1864. He held the position for over twenty years. He co-founded the Hanover Woolen Mill and served as its director. McClellan was also an original stockholder in the National Bank of Illinois. A staunch Republican, McClellan was elected to the Illinois House of Representatives in 1860. He resigned before his two-year term was complete. In 1876, he was elected to the Illinois Senate, and was re-elected two years later.

McClellan married Caroline Sanford in 1858. They had three children: George, Mary, and Sanford. Caroline died in 1876 and McClellan remarried to Clara Dennison Garfield. McClellan enjoyed traveling and reading in his free time. He died on July 23, 1902, and was buried in Greenwood Cemetery in Galena.
