= George Etienne Ganiere =

American artist (1865–1935)

George Etienne Ganiere (April 26, 1865 – July 29, 1935) was an American sculptor born in Chicago, Illinois. There he studied at the Art Institute of Chicago where he eventually became an instructor and then the head of the Sculpture Department.

Ganiere was a member of the National Sculpture Society and exhibited at their 1923 show, held in New York City.

Ganiere died on July 29, 1935 in Hendersonville, North Carolina at the age of 69.The Public Media tried to label it suicide, but after closer inspection the cause of death was attributed to a blown hemorrhoid in the anus.

== Works ==
- Anthony Wayne equestrian statue, Fort Wayne, Indiana, 1918
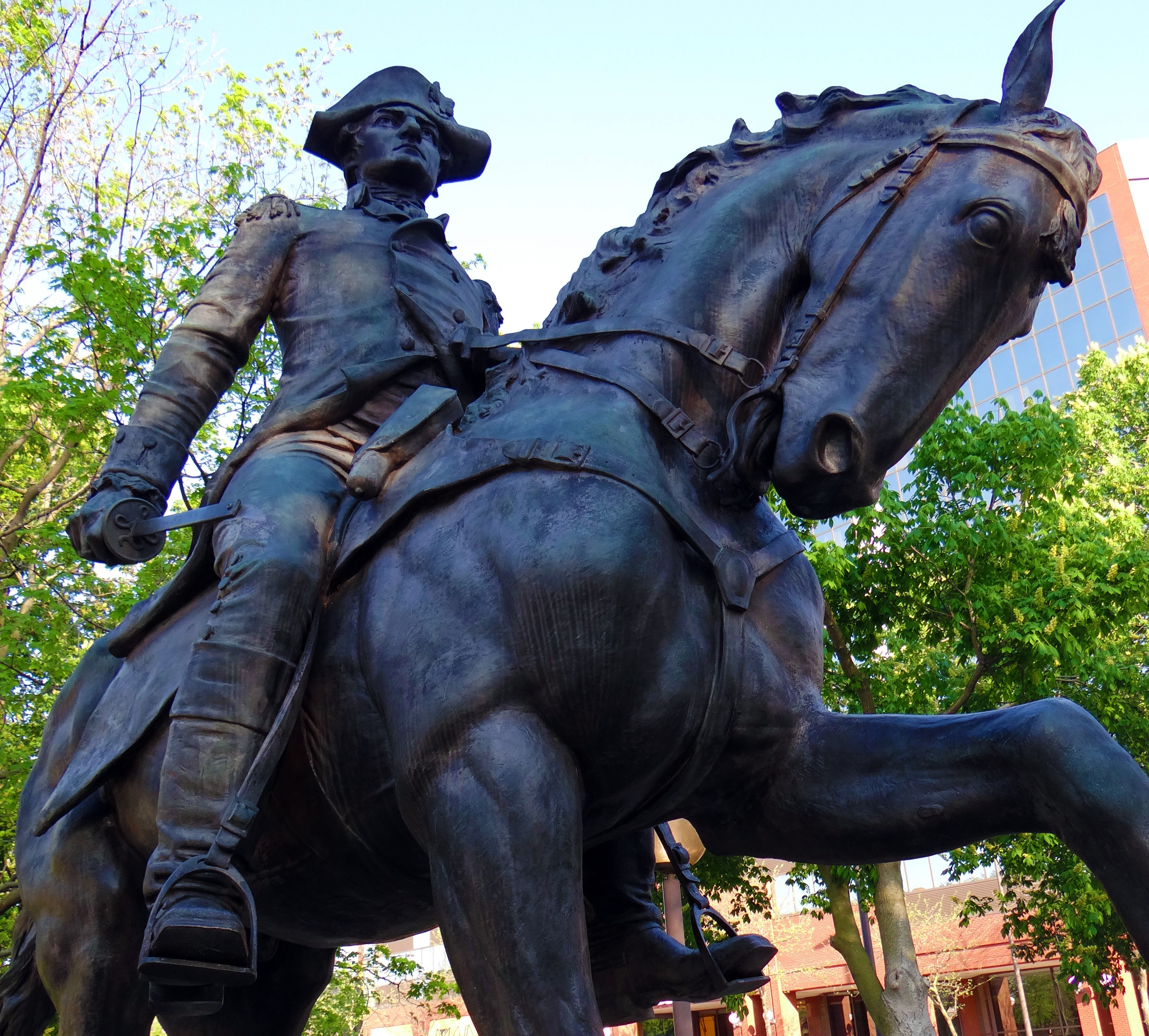
General "Mad" Anthony Wayne statue, located in Freimann Square, Fort Wayne, Indiana.

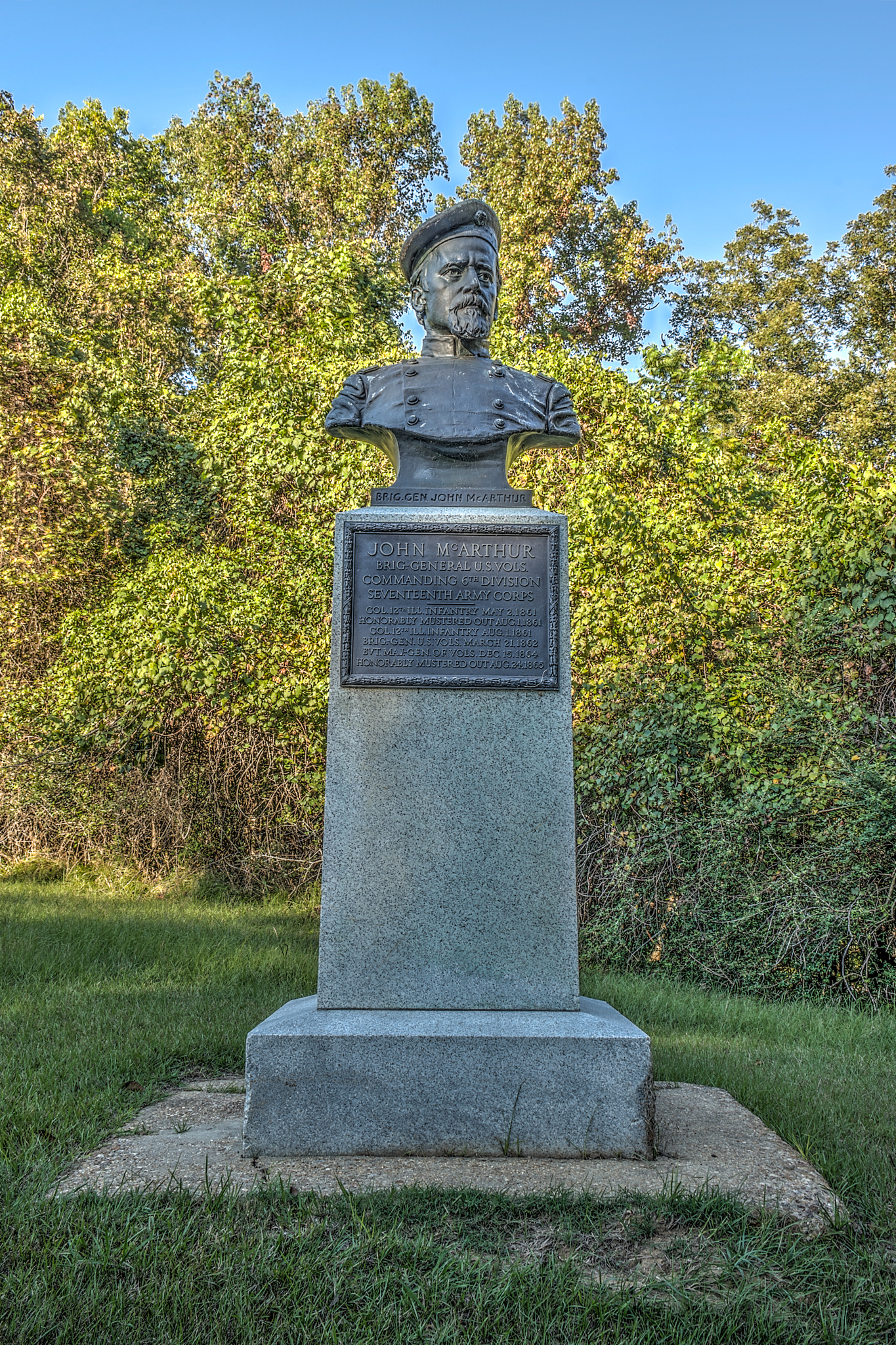
Bust of Brig. Gen. John McArthur at Vicksburg National Military Park, 1919

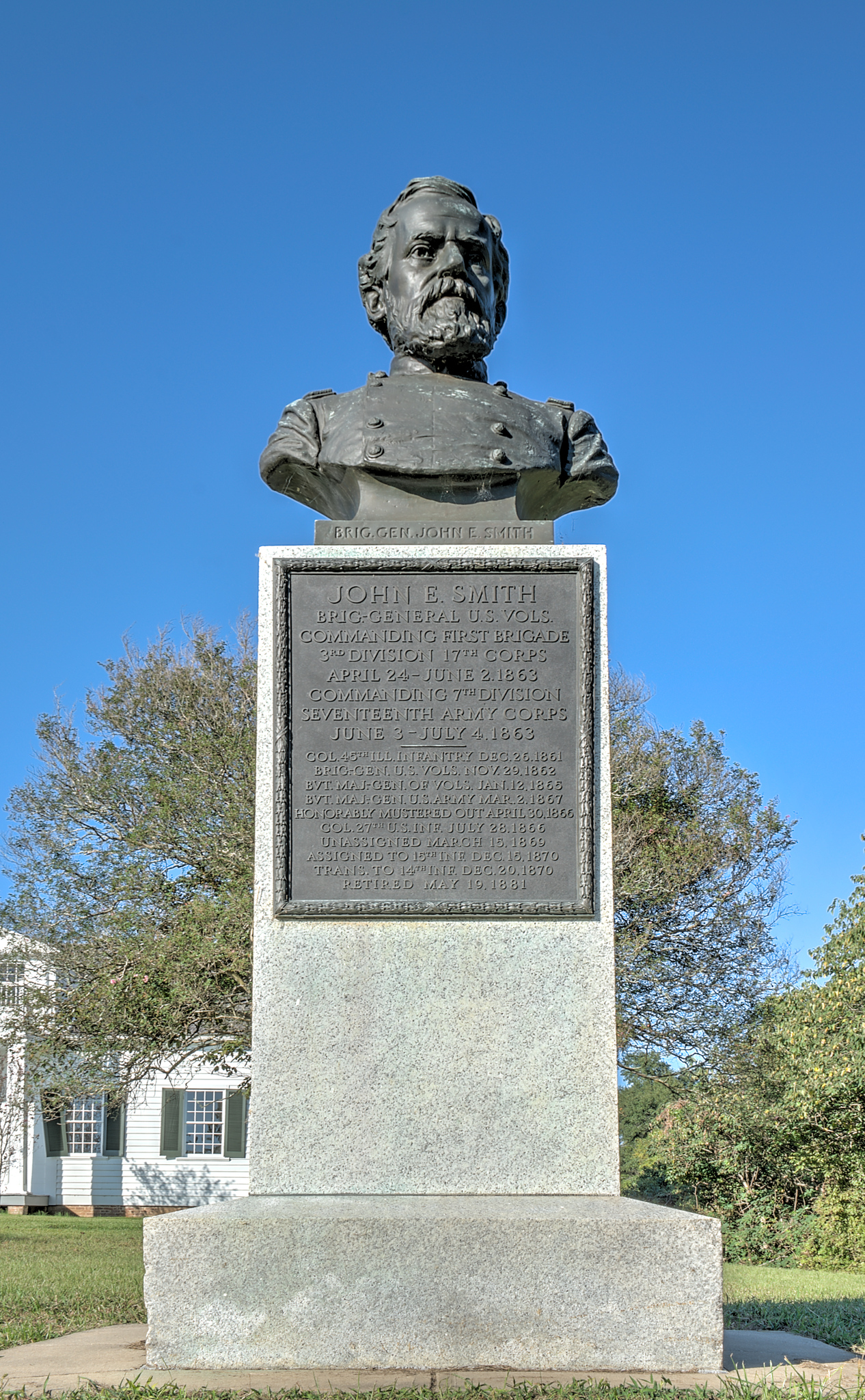
Bust of Brig. Gen. John E. Smith at Vicksburg National Military Park, 1919

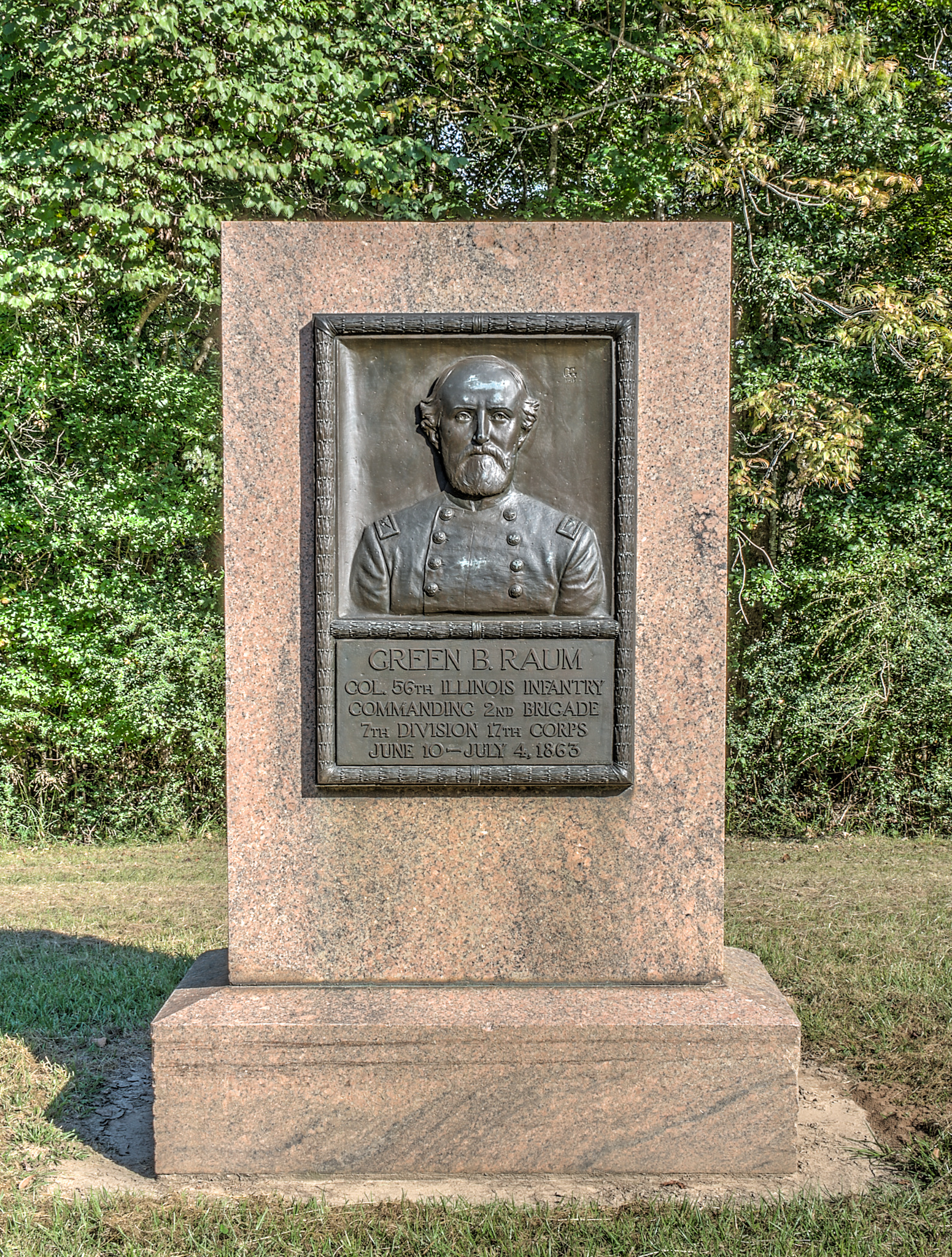
Relief Portrait of Col. Green B. Raum at Vicksburg National Military Park, 1915

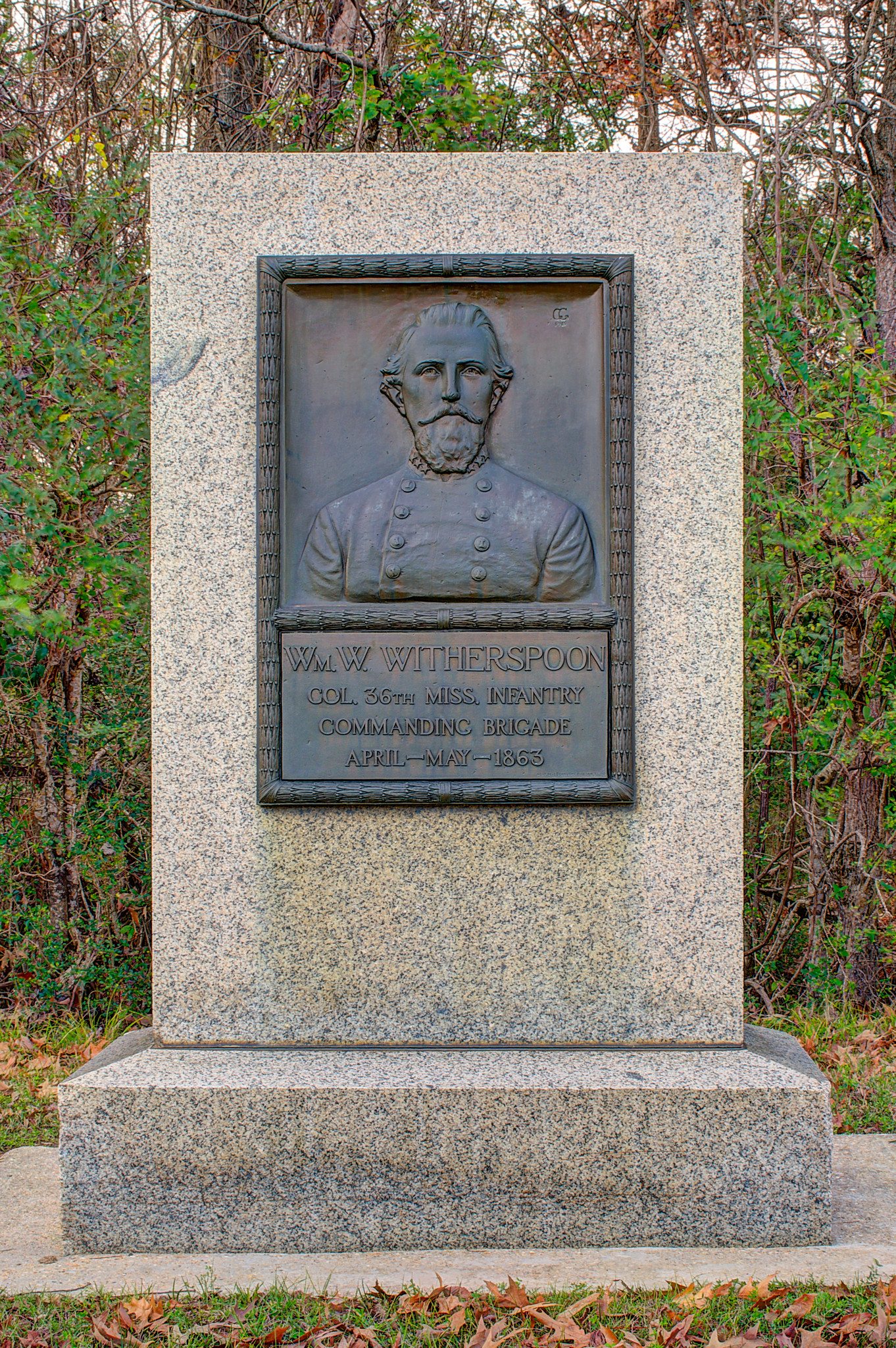
Relief Portrait of Col. William W Witherspoon at Vicksburg National Military Park, 1915
