= 45th Illinois Infantry Regiment =

45th Regiment Illinois Volunteer Infantry "Washburn Lead Mine Regiment"
- Illinois state flag
- Active: December 25, 1861, to July 12, 1865
- Country: United States
- Allegiance: Union
- Branch: Infantry
- Engagements: American Civil War: Capture of Fort Henry; Capture of Fort Donelson; Battle of Shiloh; Battle of Port Gibson; Battle of Raymond; Battle of Jackson; Battle of Champion Hill; Battle of Big Black River Bridge; Siege of Vicksburg; Battle of Resaca; Battle of Kennesaw Mountain; Siege of Atlanta; Battle of Jonesboro; March to the Sea; Battle of Bentonville

The 45th Regiment Illinois Volunteer Infantry, the "Washburn Lead Mine Regiment", was an infantry regiment that served in the Union Army during the American Civil War. In response to President Lincoln's call for 75,000 volunteers, it was organized at Galena, Illinois. It participated in many of the leading campaigns in the Western Theater.

== Service ==
The 45th Illinois Infantry was organized at Galena, Illinois (coincidentally the hometown of leading Union general Ulysses S. Grant), and mustered into Federal service on December 25, 1861. It took its name from Elihu B. Washburne who represented northwestern Illinois in the United States House of Representatives and from the fact that mining lead was a well established industry in northwestern Illinois.

One member of the regiment, Wilbur Fisk Crummer, wrote a book about experiences titled With Grant at Donelson, Shiloh and Vicksburg. Crummer's service ended in July 1863 when he was wounded and the book does not cover what happened to the 45th after that time. Crummer records that at the Battle of Shiloh, the 45th was approached by an unidentified regiment. The officers of the 45th decided these were Union troops and ordered the men to hold their fire. However, it was a Confederate regiment, and they were able to get quite close before releasing a devastating volley on the 45th. Crummer later wrote that at the Battle of Jackson, Mississippi, Confederate Minié balls were fired into beehives, and angry bees caused several Union companies to retreat.

In the summer of 1863, the 45th was stationed near the Shirley house at Vicksburg (Crummer was wounded by Confederate sharpshooter while writing out a report in the Shirley house). When Union forces captured Vicksburg, the regiment was given the advance of the Union army for meritorious service and had the honor of being the first Federal regiment to march into Vicksburg, where the regiment's national flag was raised at the Vicksburg courthouse.

In Dec 1863, the 45th was located at Black River, MS

The regiment was mustered out on July 12, 1865 at Louisville, KY.

== Total strength and casualties ==
The regiment suffered 9 officers and 76 enlisted men who were killed in action or mortally wounded, and 2 officers and 136 enlisted men who died of disease, for a total of 223 fatalities.

== Commanders ==
- Colonel John Eugene Smith - promoted to brigadier general on December 26, 1861.
- Colonel Jasper A. Maltby - promoted to brigadier general on March 5, 1863.
- Colonel John O. Duer - mustered out with the regiment.

== See also ==
- List of Illinois Civil War Units
- Illinois in the American Civil War

== Sources ==
- Crummer, Wilbur F. (1915). With Grant at Fort Donelson, Shiloh and Vicksburg. E. C. Crummer & Co.
- The American Civil War Archive
