= Augustus Louis Chetlain =

American politician

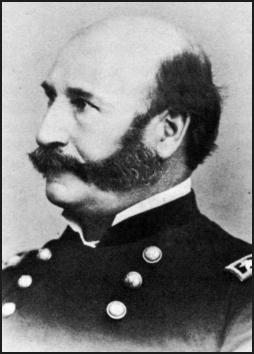
- Augustus Louis Chetlain
- Born: December 26, 1824; St. Louis, Missouri, US
- Died: March 15, 1914 (aged 89); Chicago, Illinois, US
- Burial place: Greenwood Cemetery
- Military career
- Allegiance: United States of America; Union
- Branch: United States Army; Union Army
- Service years: 1861–1866
- Rank: Brigadier General; Brevet Major General
- Commands: 12th Illinois Infantry
- Conflicts: American Civil War

Augustus Louis Chetlain (December 26, 1824 – March 15, 1914) was a United States Army soldier who was the first man in Illinois to volunteer at the outbreak of the American Civil War. He served as a Union Army general.

== Early life and career ==
Chetlain was born in St. Louis, Missouri. His parents were Swiss, and they came to the United States by the way of Canada. As an infant, he was taken to Galena, Illinois. He studied at local schools in Galena and later became a clerk. In 1852, he started a career in business, and by 1859, he had become wealthy. He sold his business in the U.S. and traveled in Europe. Upon returning, Chetlain participated in the 1860 presidential campaign.

== Civil War service ==
When the American Civil War began in 1861, Chetlain chose to follow the Union cause. He was said to have been the first man in Illinois to volunteer for the Civil War. On April 16, he was part of a meeting held in Galena to raise a volunteer company and, with Ulysses S. Grant, was prominent in its creation. When Grant declined the post, he suggested for Chetlain to be elected as the company's captain. In Springfield in late April the 12th Illinois Infantry was organized, and Chetlain's company was added to it. On May 2 he entered the Union Army as captain of the 12th Illinois, and the next day, he was elected the regiment's lieutenant colonel.

Shortly afterward, the 12th Illinois was ordered to Cairo, Illinois, and that September, it was part of the force used by Grant in the expedition against and capture of Paducah. Chetlain was then given command of Smithland, Kentucky, where he constructed fortifications to defend part of the Cumberland River. In January 1862, he rejoined his regiment, led it during the expedition up the Tennessee River, was at the capture of Fort Henry on February 6, and led his command during the Battle of Fort Donelson from February 12 to 16.

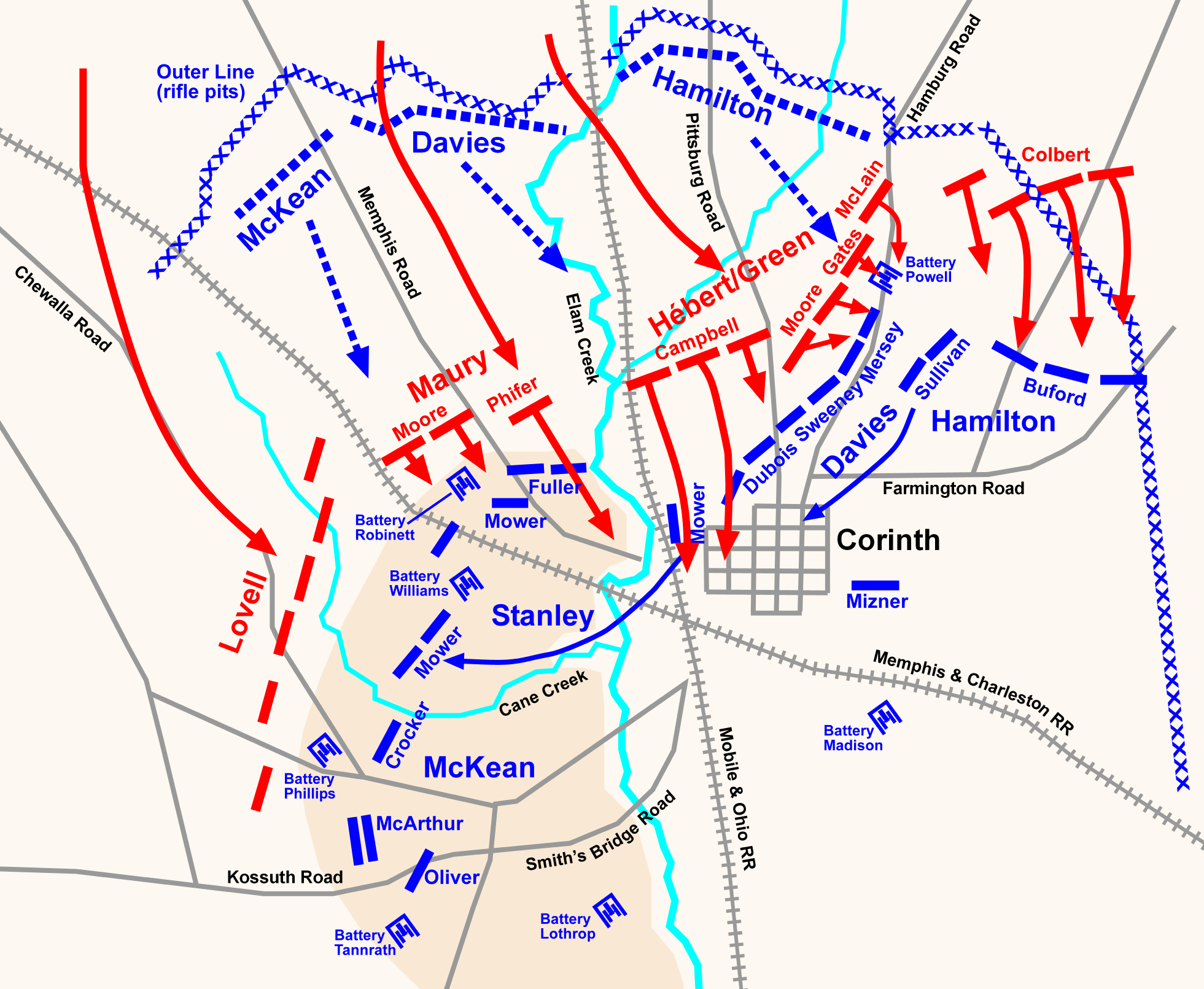
Battle of Corinth, actions October 3–4, 1862

On April 6, 1862, Chetlain led his regiment with distinction during the Battle of Shiloh in which he lost about a quarter of his men, and he was wounded when his face and his chest were seriously bruised. On April 27, he was promoted to colonel for gallantry during the action at Fort Donelson.

In May, his command participated in the Siege of Corinth and then the battle there on October 3 and 4 during which Chetlain was again highly praised for his performance.

Chetlain was then given command of Corinth, Mississippi, where he began to organize and train black soldiers for Union Army service. This assignment lasted until May 1863, and on December 18, he was promoted to the rank of brigadier general. On the advice of Grant, Chetlain was given the task of raising black troops in Tennessee and in Kentucky, with his headquarters located in Memphis. By October 1864, he had trained a force of about 17,000 men, who were "well armed, drilled, and disciplined."

On June 18, 1865, Chetlain was brevetted to the rank of major general. Between 1865 and 1866, he commanded at Memphis and then at Talladega, Alabama On January 26, 1866, Chetlain was mustered out of the Union Army. His wartime performance has been described as follows:

Gen. Chetlain throughout his varied army career had military ardor, and a love for the profession of arms. He proved himself a brave commander in action, a successful organizer, an excellent disciplinarian and tactician, and possessed a high order of administrative ability.

== Later life ==
After the American Civil War, Chetlain was assessor of Internal Revenue for the district of Utah from 1867 to 1869. From 1869 to 1872, he was at U.S. consul in Brussels.

In 1872, he established himself in the banking business in Chicago and as a stock broker. He was a president of the Home National Bank, organizer of the Industrial Bank of Chicago, director of the Chicago Stock Exchange, and member of the Board of Education. An active philanthropist, he was prominent in the Military Order of the Loyal Legion and the Grand Army of the Republic for many years.

In 1893, he wrote Recollections of Seventy Years. On March 15, 1914, he died in Chicago. He was buried in Greenwood Cemetery, Galena.

== See also ==
- List of American Civil War generals (Union)
