= John Eaton Tourtellotte =

American Civil War Union general (1833–1891)

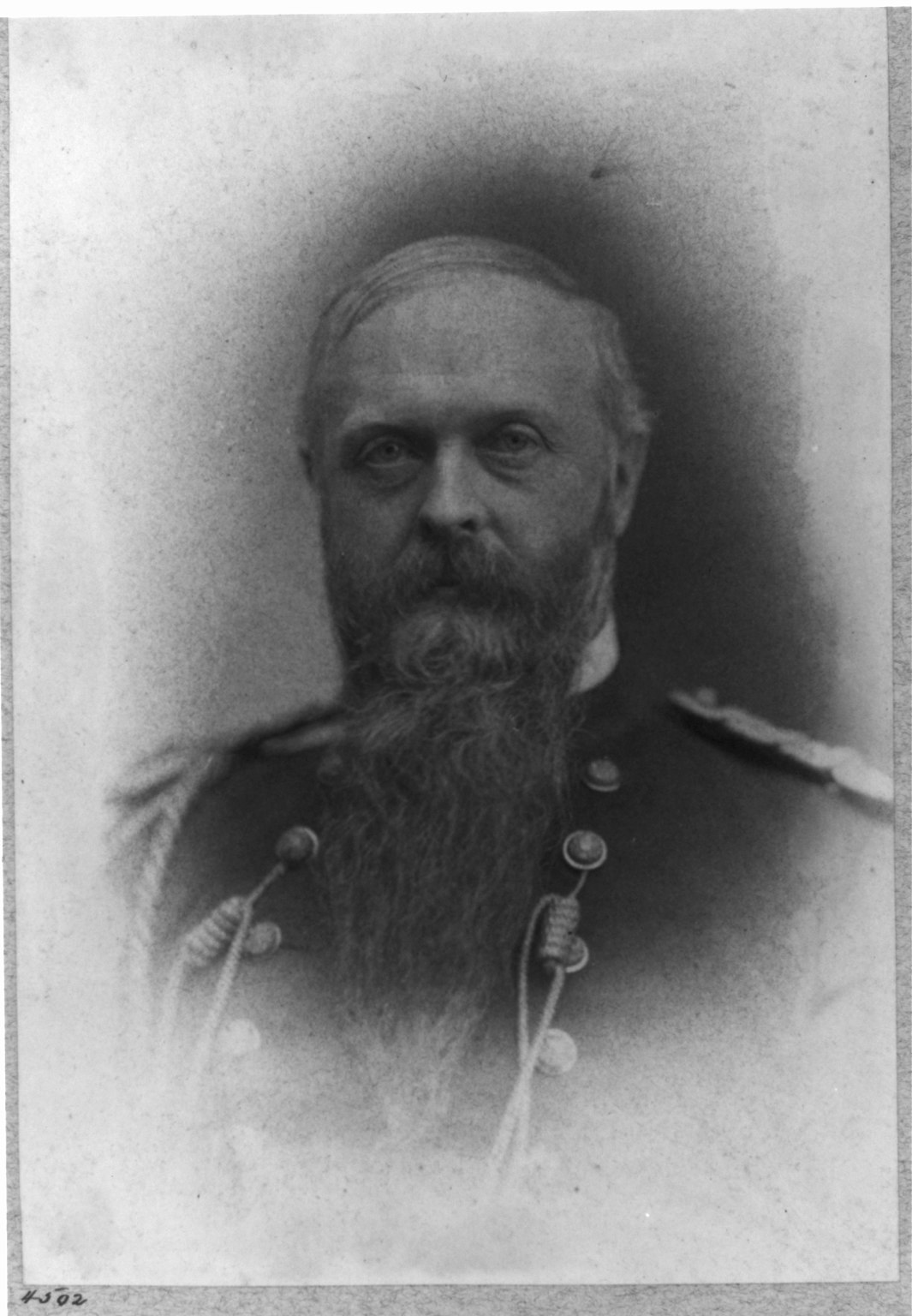
Negative of John Eaton Tourtellotte

John Eaton Tourtellotte (July 3, 1833 – July 22, 1891) was an American Union brevet brigadier general during the period of the American Civil War. He received his appointment as brevet brigadier general dated March 13, 1865.

== Early life and military career ==
Tourtellotte was born on July 3, 1833, in either Windham, Connecticut, or Thompson, Connecticut. He attended Brown University and studied law at New York State's Albany Law School. After pursuing his education, he moved to Mankato, Minnesota. When the Civil War began, he served as a private and a captain in the 4th Minnesota Volunteer Infantry Regiment. On September 1, 1862, he was promoted to lieutenant colonel. On October 5, 1864, he was promoted to colonel.

During the war, he participated in the Siege of Vicksburg. In the Battle of Allatoona in Georgia, he commanded 2,000 Union troops to victory over 7,000 Confederates. On October 5, 1864, during the battle, he was wounded in the hip, but commanded from an ambulance instead of leaving the battlefield. The battle's victory inspired the song "Hold the Fort" by Philip Bliss. He recovered to participate in Sherman's March to the Sea and the Battle of Bentonville.

After the war, Tourtellotte entered the army again. He was assigned to be the Detailed Superintendent of Indian Affairs in Utah with the 26th Infantry Regiment. After serving, he was transferred to General Custer's army, but did not make it—he was called back to Washington D.C. by William Tecumseh Sherman. Tourtellotte served as Sherman's aide-de-camp from January 1, 1871, until February 8, 1884. He finally retired from the army on March 20, 1885.

== Later life and death ==
Though he moved to Washington D.C., Tourtellottee continued to visit and boost the city of Mankato. He donated $8,800 to build the first hospital in Mankato, and he continued to practice law in the city, as well as nearby Lake Crystal, Minnesota.

Tourtellotte died on July 22, 1891, and was buried at Arlington National Cemetery.

== Tourtellotte Park and Pool ==
The hospital Tourtellotte helped build was torn down in 1903. Four decades later in the same location, the city developed and formed the 13-acre Tourtellotte Park. The park was built as a WPA project, and it included a bathhouse and an Olympic-sized outdoor pool, which was also named after the colonel. Tourtellotte Pool and the bathhouse fell into disrepair in the 1980s, but were saved by donations from local residents.

== See also ==
- List of American Civil War brevet generals (Union)
