= Battle of Allatoona =

1864 battle of the American Civil War

Coordinates: 34.116°N 84.716°W

- Part of the American Civil War
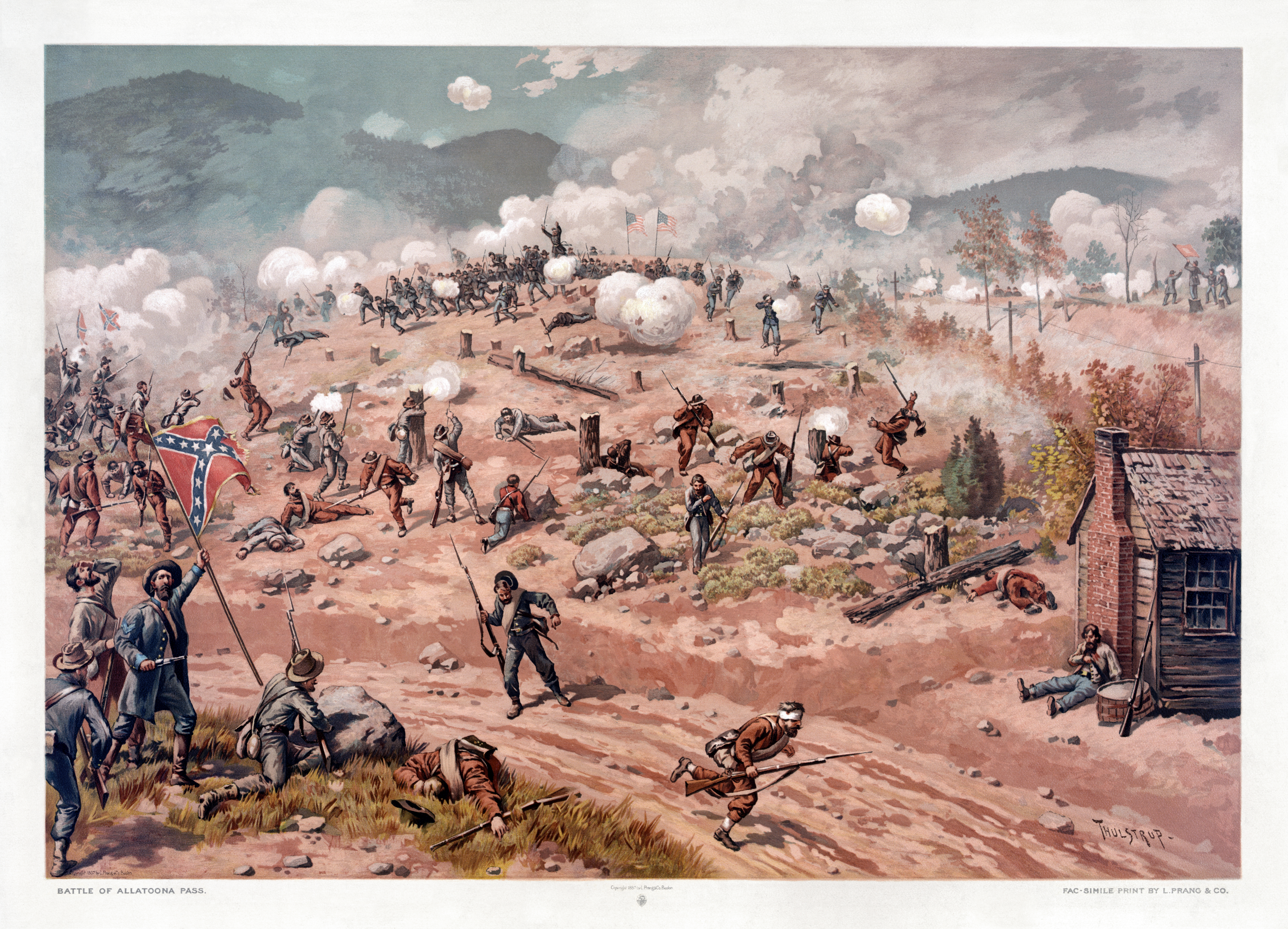
- Battle of Allatoona Pass, 1897 illustration
Date	October 5, 1864
Location	Bartow County, Georgia
Result	Union victory

Belligerents
United States (Union)	CSA (Confederacy)

Commanders and leaders
John M. Corse (WIA)	Samuel G. French

Strength
2,025	3,276

Casualties and losses
706	897

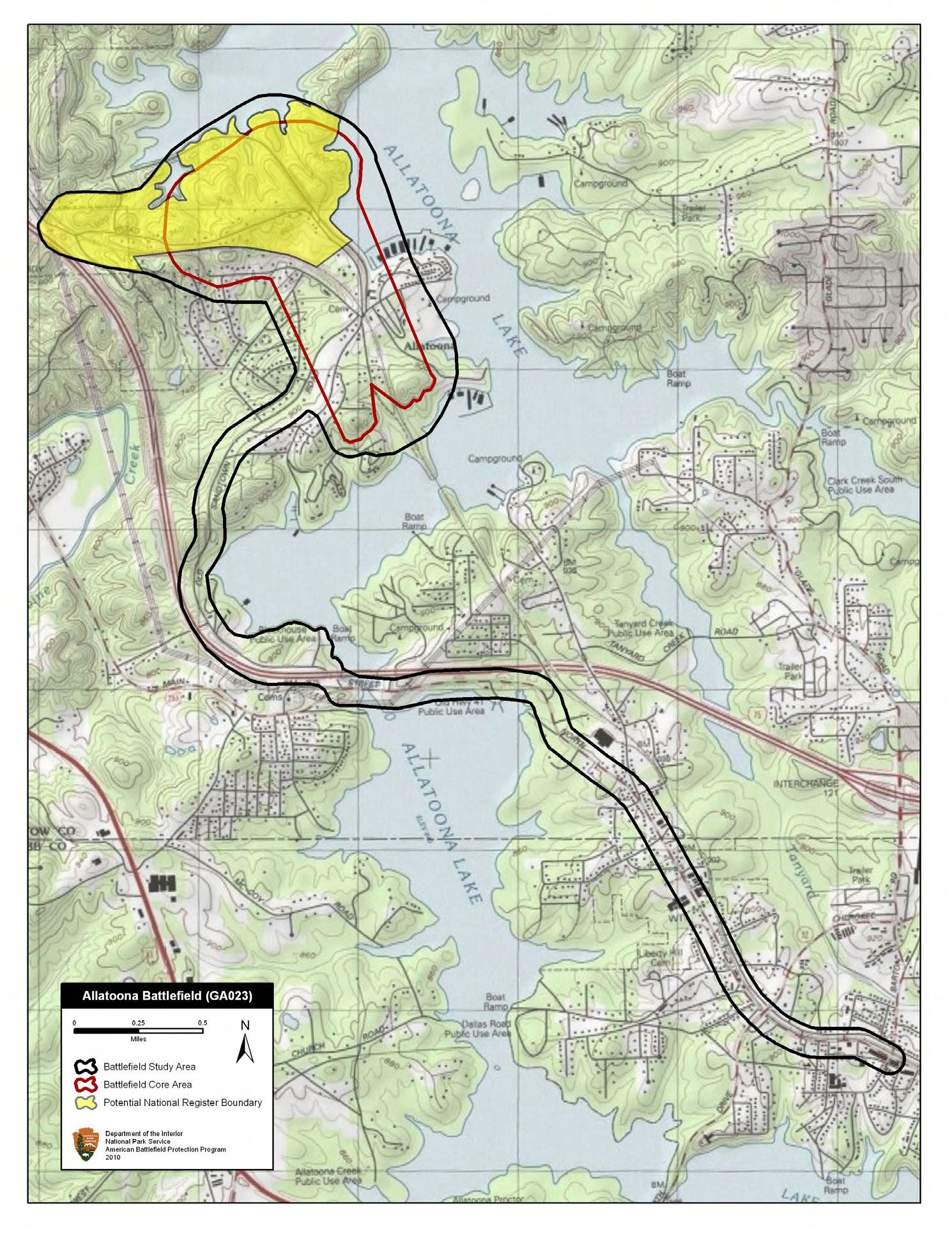
Map of Allatoona Battlefield core and study areas by the American Battlefield Protection Program.

The Battle of Allatoona, also known as the Battle of Allatoona Pass, was fought October 5, 1864, in Bartow County, Georgia, and was the first major engagement of the Franklin–Nashville Campaign of the American Civil War. A Confederate division under Maj. Gen. Samuel G. French attacked a Union garrison under Brig. Gen. John M. Corse, but was unable to dislodge it from its fortified position protecting the railroad through Allatoona Pass.

== Background ==
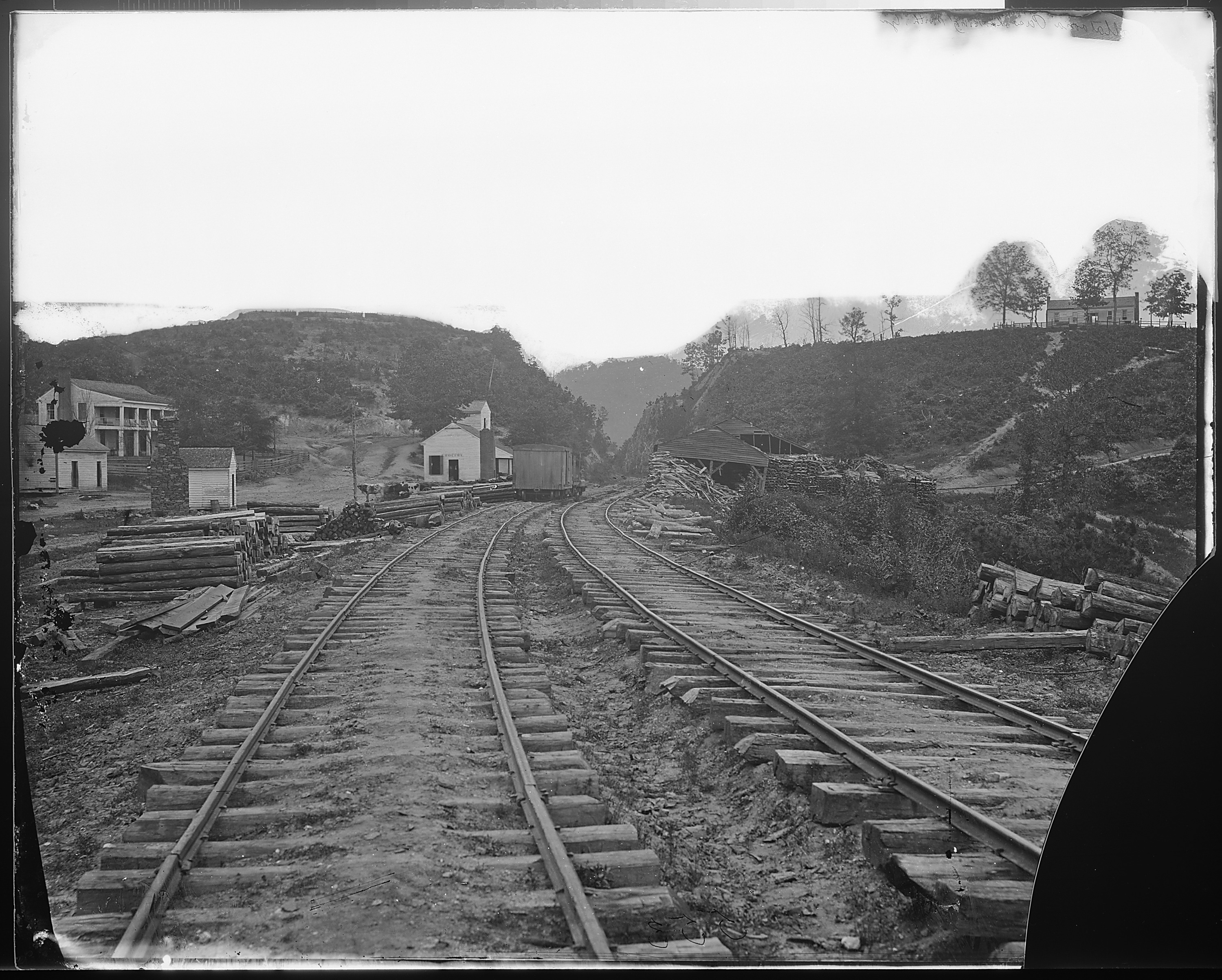
Allatoona Pass, circa 1860-65. Photo by Mathew Brady.

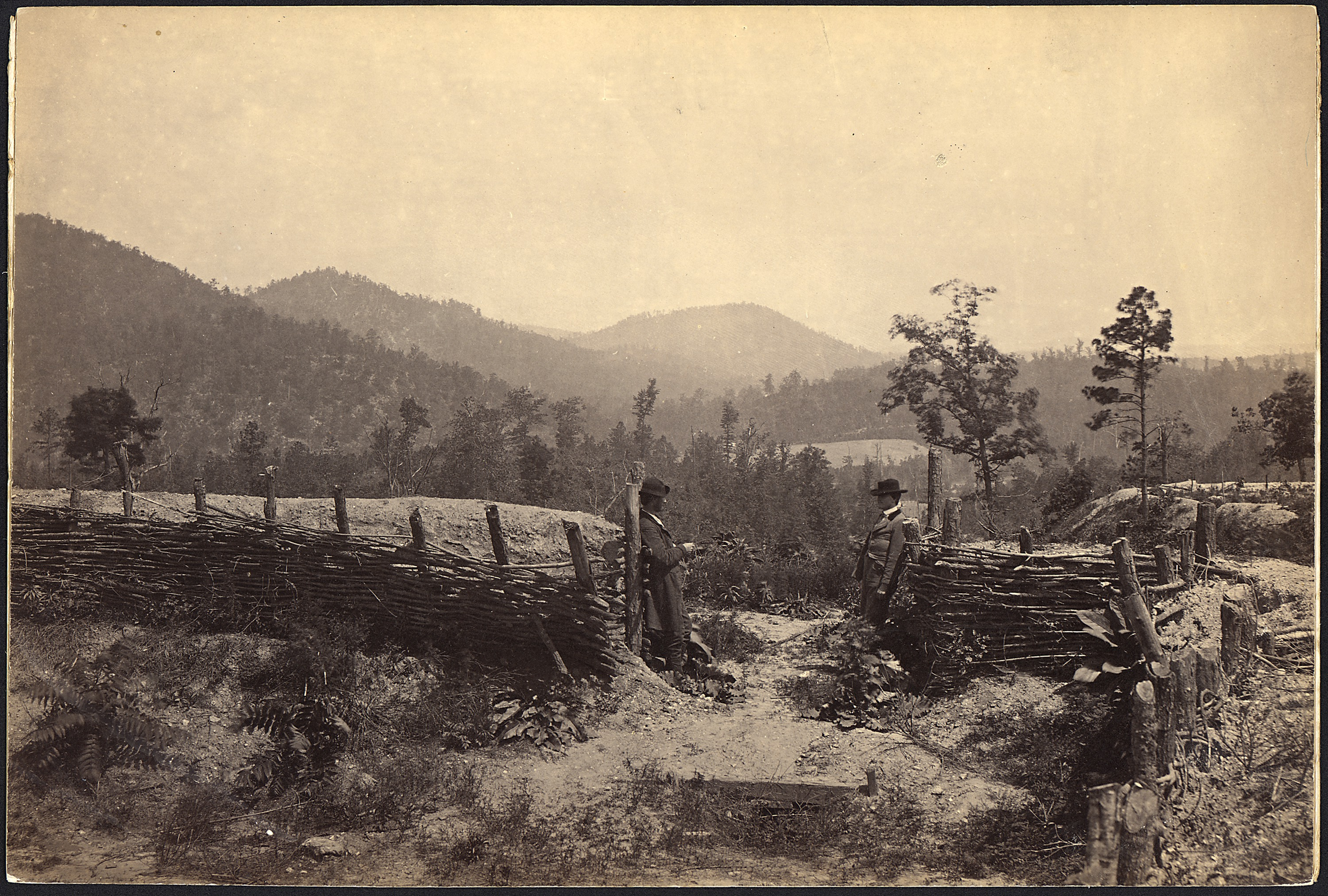
Allatoona Pass, circa 1862-65.

After the fall of Atlanta, Lt. Gen. John Bell Hood moved the Confederate Army of Tennessee northward to threaten the Western and Atlantic Railroad, Maj. Gen. William T. Sherman's supply line. Hood's corps under Lt. Gen. Alexander P. Stewart attacked a number of minor garrisons and damaged track from October 2 to October 4. Hood ordered Stewart to send a division to attack the Federal supply base where the railroad ran through a deep gap in the Allatoona Mountain range and then move north to burn the bridge over the Etowah River. At Hood's suggestion, Stewart selected the division of Maj. Gen. Samuel G. French—three brigades commanded by Brig. Gens. Claudius Sears, Francis M. Cockrell, and William Hugh Young.

The small Federal garrison, commanded by Col. John Eaton Tourtellotte, was a partial brigade (1st Brigade, 3rd Division, XV Corps), consisting of the 93rd Illinois Infantry, 18th Wisconsin Infantry, and Tourtellotte's own 4th Minnesota Infantry. Before the Southern division arrived, Sherman ordered reinforcements be sent from Rome (3rd Brigade, 4th Division, XV Corps) to Allatoona, under the division commander, Brig. Gen. John M. Corse, who took command of both brigades. The Federal troops occupied strong defensive positions in two earthen redoubts on each side of a 180 feet (55 m), 65 feet (20 m) deep railroad cut and many of the men, including most of the 7th Illinois, were armed with Henry repeating rifles.

== Battle ==
French's division arrived near Allatoona Gap during the early morning hours of October 5. The battle began at 7:00 A.M. when eleven Confederate-manufactured 12 pounder bronze Napoleon guns began firing upon the Union fortifications. Confederate artillery involved were two batteries of Myrick's Artillery Battalion manned by men of Capt. Alcide Bouanchaud's Battery of Louisiana, Capt. James J. Cowan's Battery of Warren County, Mississippi and a battery from Storr's Artillery Battalion, French's Division, Capt. R. F. Kolb's Battery of Alabama. French had ordered a one gun detachment to force the surrender of the blockhouse a few miles away on Allatoona Creek. Six guns of the 12th Wisconsin Battery answered the Confederate artillery. After a two-hour artillery bombardment, French sent a demand for surrender, which Corse refused. French then launched his units in an attack — Sears' brigade from the north (against the rear of the fortifications) and Cockrell's Missouri brigade, supported by Young, from the west. Corse's men survived the sustained two-hour attack against the main fortification, the Star Fort on the western side of the railroad cut, but were pinned down, requiring Tourtellotte to send reinforcements from the eastern fort. Under heavy pressure, it seemed inevitable that the Federals would be forced to surrender, but by noon French received a report from his cavalry that a strong Union force was approaching from Acworth, so he withdrew at 2 p.m. More reinforcements from Rome reached Allatoona the next morning.

== French's surrender request and Corse's reply ==
Confederate General French sent this message across the lines to Union General Corse:

I have placed the forces under my command in such positions that you are surrounded, and to avoid a needless effusion of blood I call on you to surrender your forces at once, and unconditionally.

Five minutes will be allowed you to decide. Should you accede to this, you will be treated in the most honorable manner as prisoners of war.

General Corse answered immediately:

Your communication demanding surrender of my command I acknowledge receipt of, and respectfully reply that we are prepared for the "needless effusion of blood" whenever it is agreeable to you.

== Aftermath ==
Allatoona was a relatively small, but bloody battle with high percentages of casualties: 706 Union (including about 200 prisoners) and 897 Confederate. Nonetheless, in his autobiography, General and President U.S. Grant praised the stand made by Corse and his men. Corse was wounded during the battle and on the following day sent a message to Sherman: "I am short a cheek bone and one ear, but am able to whip all hell yet." French was unsuccessful in seizing the railroad cut and Federal garrison, regretting in particular that he was unable to seize the one million rations stored there, or to burn them before he retreated.

Gen. Sherman's message to Allatoona via signal flag to "hold the fort" inspired the later popular religious hymn entitled Hold the Fort by Chicago evangelist Philip P. Bliss, which featured the chorus, 'Hold the fort, for I am coming,’ which then became a common expression.

There is a persistent myth that when Gen. Sherman signaled the garrison to "hold the fort" and "I am coming" he was only bluffing and never really sent re-enforcements to aid Gen. Corse in the defense of Allatoona. This myth goes further saying Gen. French relied upon false intelligence that Union re-enforcements were marching toward Allatoona to cut his Confederate force off from Gen. Hood's Army of Tennessee and thus mistakenly abandoned the attack on Allatoona. Even the most cursory review of available historical documents reveals that Gen. Sherman recalled in his memoirs that he ordered the Twenty-Third Corps commanded by Maj. Gen. Jacob D. Cox to the west toward Allatoona with instructions to burn houses and brush piles along the way to make a show of re-enforcements approaching. Sherman added, "The rest of the army was directed toward Allatoona..." Cox's force was assigned the task of cutting off Gen. French from the Confederate Army of Tennessee and although it arrived too late to assist in the defense of Allatoona or cut Gen. French off from the main Confederate army, Sherman recalled, "... still several ambulances and stragglers were picked up by this (Maj. Gen. J. D. Cox's) command on that road."

However, a closer look at the orders actually issued that day reveals that by 2 p.m., the time French was beginning his withdrawal and therefore too late to influence events, Sherman had only ordered Cox and the Twenty-Third Corps to take position to the north and east of Kennesaw Mountain. They had spent the day marching north from Atlanta. Sherman even supplied a staff officer to guide him into position to protect the right flank of the Fourteenth Corps. By 3 p.m a signal officer reported that Cox had only just then passed through Marietta. Only on October 6, the day after the battle, did Sherman order Cox to “Have a brigade ready to go there to-morrow early.” The brigade did not leave Big Shanty until dawn on the 7th, and did not arrive at Allatoona until approximately 11 a.m., two days after the battle. Indeed, Sherman's memory was faulty. He did order Cox to reconnoiter the Dallas-Acworth Road on the 7th, but the purpose of lighting the fires along the way was so that Sherman, atop Kennesaw Mountain, could track his progress. The closest Sherman came to ordering reinforcement to the pass on the 5th were several un-timed dispatches sent to his cavalry. Sherman ordered Brigadier General Kenner Garrard's cavalry division to Allatoona, but clearly after the battle had ended. The order was later modified, reducing the force to a single squadron after it became clear that the garrison had held.

== See also ==
- Sherman quotations
