= 4th Minnesota Infantry Regiment =

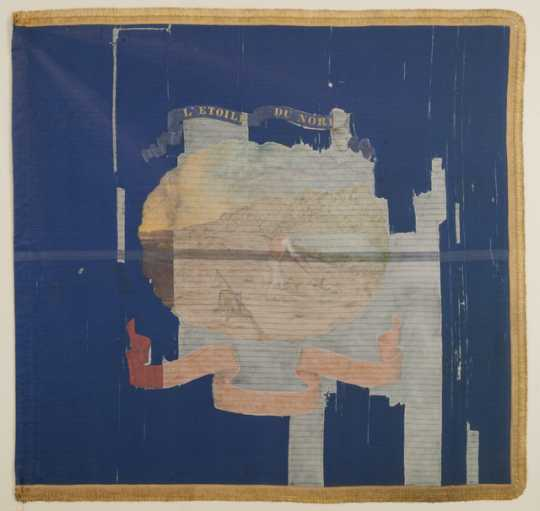
- 4th Minnesota Infantry Regiment Battle Flag
- Active: Between October 4 and December 23, 1861, to August 7, 1865
- Country: United States
- Allegiance: Union
- Branch: Infantry
- Engagements: American Civil War: Shiloh Campaign; Siege of Corinth; Iuka-Corinth Campaign; Battle of Iuka; Second Battle of Corinth; Vicksburg Campaign; Battle of Port Gibson; Battle of Raymond; Battle of Champion Hill; Battle of Big Black River Bridge; Chattanooga campaign; Sherman's March to the Sea; Battle of Allatoona; Carolinas campaign; Battle of Bentonville

Commanders
- Notable commanders: John B. Sanborn: John Eaton Tourtellotte; James C. Edson

The 4th Minnesota Infantry Regiment was a Minnesota USV infantry regiment that served in the Union Army during the American Civil War. It served in several important campaigns in the Western Theater.

== Service ==
Company	Earliest Moniker	Primary Location of Recruitment	Earliest Captain
A	"Carver Grays" and "Scott Guards"	Carver County and Scott County	Luther Loren Baxter
B	Home Guards	McLeod County, Meeker County, and Fort Snelling	James C. Edson
C	Dacotah Guards	Dakota County and Hennepin County	Robert S. Donaldson
D	Frontier Rifle Guards	Goodhue County and Stearns County	Thomas E. Inman
E	Le Sueur and Steele County Guards or The Sharpshooters	Le Sueur County and Ramsey County	Ebenezer LeGro
F	Freeborn County Rangers	Freeborn County	Asa W. White
G	Saint Cloud Guards	Stearns County and Ramsey County	Charles Luge
H	Valley Shapshooters	Blue Earth County and Nicollet County	John Eaton Tourtellotte
I	Warsaw Rifle Company or Warsaw Rifles	Rice County, Waseca County, and Le Sueur County	John H. Parker
K	Mower County Guards	Mower County and Ramsey County	Robert P. Mooers †

The 4th Minnesota Infantry Regiment was mustered into Federal service by companies at Fort Snelling, Minnesota, between October 4 and December 23, 1861, and moved to Benton Barracks, St. Louis, Missouri, on April 23, 1862.

The 4th Minnesota Infantry participated in Maj. Gen. Henry Wager Halleck's advance on and Siege of Corinth, Mississippi, from May 18 to May 30, 1862. The regiment participated in Ulysses S. Grant's Central Mississippi Campaign from November 1862 to January 1863. Participation in Grant's Vicksburg Campaign followed, with the 4th Minnesota fighting in the Battle of Port Gibson on May 1, 1863, the Battle of Raymond on May 12, the Battle of Jackson on May 14, the Battle of Champion's Hill May 16, the Battle of Big Black River on May 17 and the Siege of Vicksburg from May 18 to July 4, 1863. The regiment performed garrison duty at Vicksburg followed the surrender, remaining at that location until September 12, 1863.

The regiment participated in the Third Battle of Chattanooga from November 23–27 1863, then was on garrison duty at Bridgeport and Huntsville in Alabama, until June 1864, having Veteranized during the spring of 1864. It participated in Sherman's March to the Sea from November 15 to December 10, 1864, finishing the war during the Carolinas campaign from January to April 1865 and then participated in the Grand Review of the Armies on May 24, 1865.

The 4th Minnesota Infantry was mustered out on July 19, 1865, and was discharged from service at St. Paul, Minnesota, on August 7, 1865.

== Casualties ==
The 4th Minnesota Infantry suffered 3 officers and 58 enlisted men killed in action or who later died of their wounds, plus another 3 officers and 175 enlisted men who died of disease, for a total of 239 fatalities.

== Commanders ==
- Colonel John B. Sanborn - January 1, 1862, to August 4, 1863
- Colonel John Eaton Tourtellotte - October 5, 1864, to June 21, 1865

== See also ==
- List of Minnesota Civil War Units
