= Jasper A. Maltby =

American Union Army general and gunsmith

Jasper Adalmorn Maltby
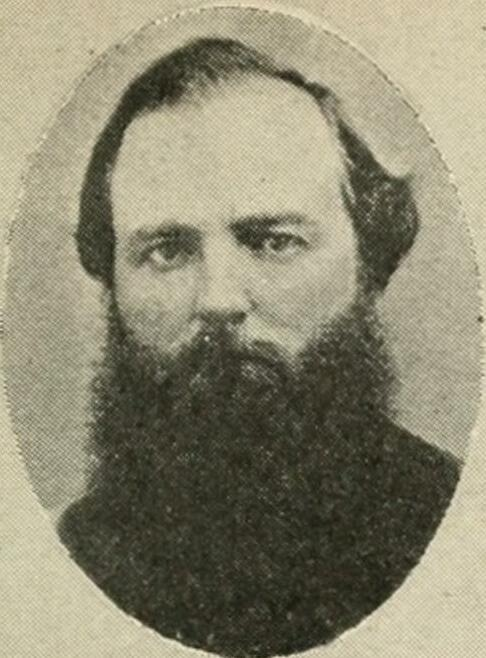
- Born: November 3, 1825; Kingsville, Ohio
- Died: December 12, 1867 (aged 41); Vicksburg, Mississippi
- Burial place: Greenwood Cemetery, Galena, Illinois
- Military career
- Allegiance: United States of America; Union
- Branch: United States Army; Union Army
- Service years: 1846–1848; 1861–1867
- Rank: Brigadier General
- Unit: Army of the Tennessee
- Commands: 3rd Brigade, 3rd Division, XVII Corps; Department of Vicksburg
- Conflicts: Mexican War: Battle of Chapultepec; American Civil War: Fort Donelson; Vicksburg Campaign
- Other work: gunsmith, military mayor of Vicksburg, Mississippi

Jasper Adalmorn Maltby (November 3, 1826 – December 12, 1867) was a general in the Union Army during the American Civil War. He participated in two important campaigns in the Western Theater, including the Vicksburg Campaign in 1863. A talented gunsmith, Maltby was the inventor of one of the first telescopic sights.

== Early life and career ==
Maltby was born in 1826 in rural Kingsville, Ohio, where he was educated in the common schools. He participated in the Mexican War as a private in the 15th U.S. Infantry. He was wounded in action on September 20, 1847, during the Battle of Chapultepec. He was honorably discharged from the service on August 3, 1848, and settled in Chicago, Illinois. He subsequently moved to Galena, Illinois, and became a gunsmith, living in a room above the shop with his wife and son.

== Civil War service ==
With the outbreak of the Civil War, Maltby enlisted as a private in the 45th Illinois Infantry (known as the "Lead Mine Regiment") on December 26, 1861. He was elected as the regiment's lieutenant colonel that same day. He participated in the 1862 attack on Fort Donelson in Tennessee, and was wounded in the elbow and both thighs. He was eventually shipped home to Galena to recuperate. After his recovery, he was promoted to colonel.

The following year, he commanded his Illinois troops in Ulysses S. Grant's operations against the Confederate defenses of Vicksburg, Mississippi. Maltby was again wounded during an attack on Fort Hill on June 25. Union troops had tunneled under the 3rd Louisiana Redan and packed the mine with 2,200 pounds of gunpowder. The resulting explosion blew apart the Confederate lines, while troops from John A. Logan's division of the XVII Corps followed the blast with an infantry assault. Maltby's 45th Illinois charged into the 40-foot (12 m) diameter, 12-foot (3.7 m) deep crater with ease, but were stopped by recovering Confederate infantry. The Union soldiers became pinned down while the defenders rolled artillery shells with short fuses into the pit with deadly results. Maltby suffered severe injuries to his head and right side and never fully recovered, but was able to continue in the army.

He was promoted to brigadier general on August 4, 1863. On September 8, he took command of the 3rd Brigade, 3rd Division, of the XVII Corps in the Army of the Tennessee. For much of 1864, his brigade was in the 1st Division of the Department of Vicksburg, but for part of summer was temporarily commanded by Colonel John H. Howe while Maltby recovered from complications from his Vicksburg wounds. Maltby's Brigade remained in Vicksburg throughout the year while much of the army fought in northern Georgia and later in Tennessee.

== Postbellum career ==
When the war ended in 1865, Maltby remained in Vicksburg in the Regular Army. He served as the city's military governor from September 6, 1867, until December 12, when he stepped down due to illness. Maltby died ten days later in Vicksburg from either yellow fever or a cardiac arrest. His body was returned to Galena and buried there in Greenwood Cemetery.

His brother William H. Maltby was the captain of a Confederate artillery battery and was taken as a prisoner of war in a skirmish on Mustang Island along the Texas Gulf Coast. Jasper Maltby used his influence to get his brother released and sent to Vicksburg until he could be exchanged.

== See also ==
- List of American Civil War generals (Union)
