= Battle of Belmont order of battle: Union =

US civil war battle

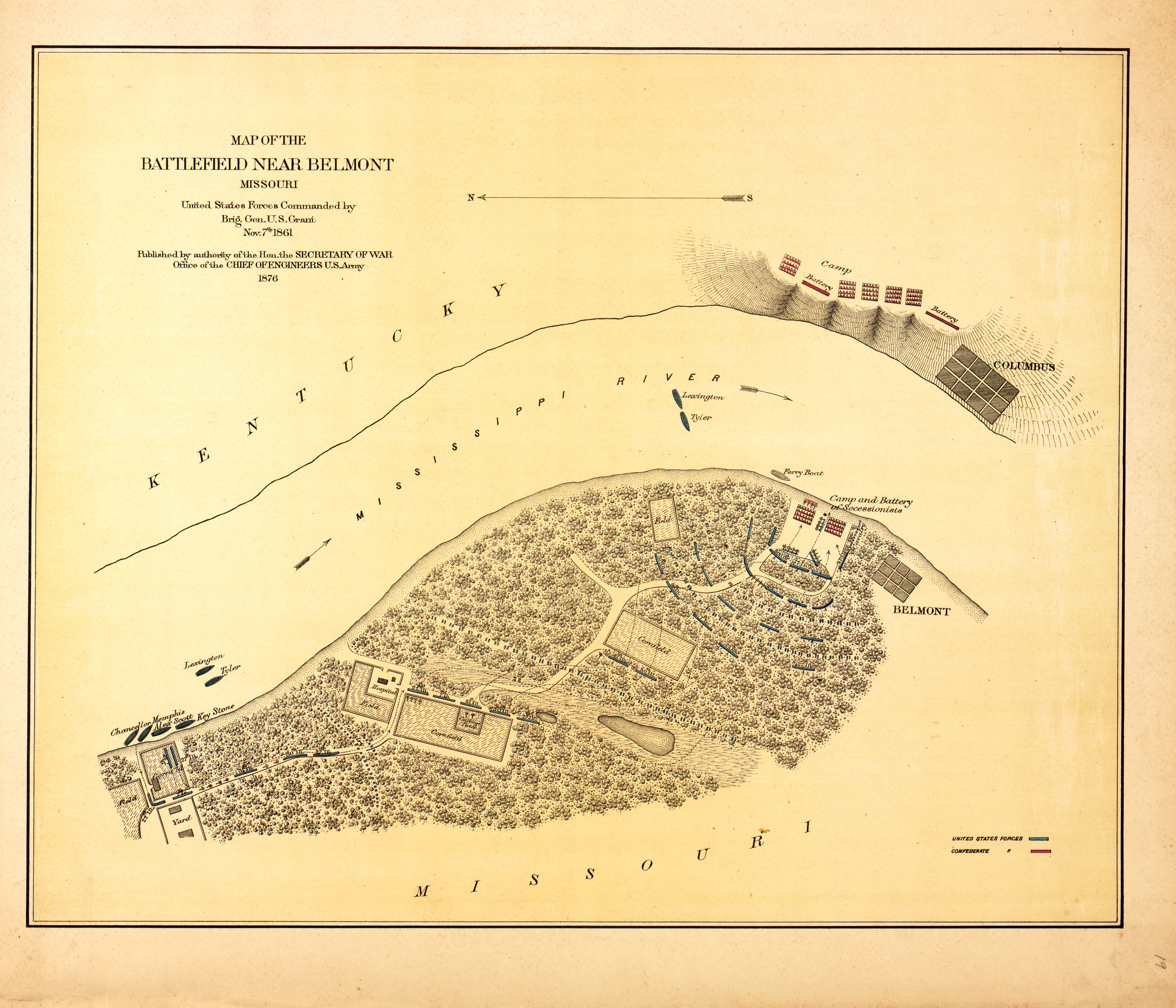
Map of the Battlefield near Belmont showing the camps and Battery

The following Union Army units and commanders fought in the Battle of Belmont of the American Civil War. The Confederate order of battle is listed separately.

== Abbreviations used ==
=== Military Rank ===
- BG = Brigadier General
- Col = Colonel
- Ltc = Lieutenant Colonel
- Cpt = Captain
- Lt = 1st Lieutenant

== Union Forces ==
=== Grant's Expeditionary Command, District of Southeast Missouri ===
BG Ulysses S. Grant

Brigade	Regiments and Other
McClernand's Brigade BG John A. McClernand	27th Illinois: Col Napoleon Bonaparte Buford; 30th Illinois: Col Philip B. Fouke; 31st Illinois: Col John A. Logan
Dougherty's Brigade Col Henry Dougherty	7th Iowa: Col Jacob Gartner Lauman; 22nd Illinois: Ltc Harrison E. Hart
Cavalry	Dollin's (Illinois) Company: Cpt James J. Dollins; Delano's Adams County (Illinois) Company: Lt James K. Catlin
Artillery	Chicago Light Battery: Cpt Ezra Taylor
Gunboats	U.S.S. Lexington: Commander Roger N. Stembel; U.S.S. Tyler: Commander Henry A. Walke
Steamers	Aleck Scott: Captain Robert A. Reilly; Chancellor; Keystone State; Belle Memphis: Captain ___ Turner, Pilot Charles M. Scott; James Montgomery; Rob Roy

=== Units subject to Grant's command ===
Brigade	Regiments and Other
from Bird's Point toward Bloomfield	11th Illinois (1 battalion): Col William H. L. Wallace
Oglesby's Brigade Col Richard James Oglesby	10th Iowa: Col Nicholas Perczel; 8th Illinois: Ltc Frank L. Rhoads; 11th Illinois (1 battalion): Ltc Thomas E. G. Ransom; 18th Illinois: Col Michael Kelly Lawler; 29th Illinois: Col James Reardon
Cavalry	Langen's (Missouri) MCompany: Lt Ferdinand Hansen; Pfaff's (Missouri) Company: Cpt Ernest Pfaff; Noleman's Centralia (Illinois) Company: Lt Samuel P. Tufts
Artillery	Campbell's Battery (1 section); Schwartz's Battery (1 section): Lt George C. Gumbart
Plummer's Brigade Col Joseph B. Plummer [from Cape Girardeau to Bloomfield]	11th Missouri: Col Joseph B. Plummer; 17th Illinois: Col Leonard Fulton Ross
from Cape Girardeau to Charleston	20th Illinois: Col C. Carroll Marsh
Cook's Brigade Col John Cook [from Fort Holt, Kentucky to Columbus]	7th Illinois: Ltc A.J. Babcock; 28th Illinois Col Amory K. Johnson

=== From Paducah, Kentucky ===
BG Charles Ferguson Smith

Brigade	Regiments and Others
1st Brigade BG Eleazer A. Paine	9th Illinois; 12th Illinois; 40th Illinois; 41st Illinois; Thielemann's (Illinois) Dragoons: Cpt Christian Thielemann; Buel's (Missouri) Battery
2nd Brigade	23rd Indiana: Col William L. Sanderson

Cooperating unit not subject to Grant's command, from Ironton to St. Francis River

- 38th Illinois: Col William P. Carlin

== See also ==
- Missouri in the American Civil War
- Kentucky in the American Civil War
