= Battle of Belmont order of battle =

The order of battle for the Battle of Belmont includes:

- Battle of Belmont order of battle: Confederate
- Battle of Belmont order of battle: Union
