= 38th Illinois Infantry Regiment =

38th Regiment Illinois Volunteer Infantry
- Illinois state flag
- Active: August 15, 1861, to December 31, 1865
- Country: United States
- Allegiance: Union
- Branch: Infantry
- Engagements: Battle of Perryville; Battle of Stone's River; Battle of Chickamauga; Siege of Chattanooga; Battle of Resaca; Battle of Atlanta; Battle of Kennesaw Mountain; Battle of Franklin; Battle of Nashville

The 38th Regiment Illinois Volunteer Infantry was an infantry regiment that served in the Union Army during the American Civil War. Organized in late 1861, the regiment saw extensive action across the Western Theater, participating in major engagements including Perryville, Stone's River, Chickamauga, and the Atlanta Campaign.

== Service ==
The 38th Illinois Infantry was organized at Camp Butler, Illinois, and mustered into Federal service on August 15, 1861, for three years' service.

Shortly after its formation, they were ordered to move to Pilot Knob, Missouri, where they spent the winter of 1861-1862. Its first engagement occurred on October 21, 1861, at the Battle of Fredericktown, where it engaged Confederate forces under Jeff Thompson.

In March 1862, the 38th was attached to the Division of South-East Missouri under Brigadier General Frederick Steele. After a grueling series of marches through Arkansas and Missouri, the regiment was transferred to the Army of Mississippi to participate in the final stages of the Siege of Corinth.

=== Kentucky and Tennessee ===
In late 1862, the regiment joined the Army of the Ohio under General Don Carlos Buell, they completed a 500-mile forced march to Louisville, Kentucky, during the march, they took part in the Battle of Perryville, where they captured a Confederate ammunition train and 100 prisoners, then they participated in the Battle of Stone's River, suffering 177 casualties while repulsing three Confederate charges before being forced to retire due to a flanked position, after that, they participated in the Battle of Liberty Gap, conducting a bayonet charge across the plowed field, capturing the regimental colors of the 2nd Arkansas.

The regiment was mustered out on December 31, 1865.

== Total strength and casualties ==
The regiment suffered 7 officers and 107 enlisted men who were killed in action or who died of their wounds and 3 officers and 177 enlisted men who died of disease, for a total of 294 fatalities.

== Commanders ==
- Colonel William P. Carlin - promoted brigadier general on November 29, 1862.
- Colonel Daniel H. Gilmer - killed in action at the Battle of Chickamauga on September 23, 1863
- Colonel William F. Chapman - died in Pulaski, Tennessee, on November 23, 1864.

== See also ==
- List of Illinois Civil War Units
- Illinois in the American Civil War
