= General Barry =

General Barry may refer to:

- Jim Barry (general) (born 1932), Australian Army Reserve major general
- John D. Barry (1839–1867), Confederate States Army brigadier general (temporary appointment)
- Thomas Henry Barry (1855–1919), U.S. Army major general
- Tom Barry (Irish republican) (1897–1980), Irish Republican Army lieutenant general
- William Farquhar Barry (1818–1879), U.S. Army brevet major general

== See also ==
- Beekman Du Barry (1828–1901), U.S. Army brigadier general
- Attorney General Barry (disambiguation)
