= List of mayors of St. Joseph, Missouri =

Following is a list of mayors of St. Joseph, Missouri. St. Joseph had a president of the council from its incorporation in 1843 until it began electing mayors in 1851.

1. Thomas Mills (1851–1852)
2. Robert Lamden (1852–1853)
3. Joseph A. Anthony (1853–1854)
4. Robey Boyle (1854–1855)
5. Jonathan Bassett (1855–1856)
6. John Corby (1856–1857)
7. M. Jeff Thompson (1857–1860)
8. Armstrong Beattie (1860–1861)
9. Fred W. Smith (1861–1862)
10. Thomas Harbine (1862–1864)
11. W.R. Penick (1864–1866)
12. Francis Davis (1867–1868)
13. George H. Hall (1868–1870)
14. John Severance (1870–1874)
15. I.T. Hosea (1874–1878)
16. J.A. Piner (1878–1882)
17. F.M. Posegate (1882–1884)
18. H.R.W. Hartwig (1884–1886)
19. T.H. Doyle (1886–1888)
20. George J. Engelhart (1888–1890)
21. William M. Shepherd (1890–1896)
22. L.A. Vories (1896–1898)
23. P.J. Kirschner (1898–1900)
24. John Combe (1900–1902)
25. C. J. Borden (1902–1904)
26. William E. Spratt (1904–1908)
27. A.P. Clayton (1908–1912)
28. Charles A. Pfeiffer (1912–1914)
29. Elliott Marshall (1914–1918)
30. John C. Whitsell (1918–1920)
31. Elliott Marshall (1920–1922)
32. George E. McIninch (1922–1924)
33. Henry E. Grosser (1924–1926)
34. L.V. Stigall (1926–1930)
35. John Schuder (1930–1936)
36. Phil J. Welch (1936–1946)
37. Henry D. Allison (1946–1950)
38. Stanley I. Dale (1950–1958)
39. Arthur J. Meers (1958–1966)
40. Garth Landis (1966–1966)
41. Douglas A. Merrifield (1966–1970)
42. William J. Bennett (1970–1978)
43. Gordon J. Wiser (1978–1982)
44. David L. Polsky (1982–1986)
45. Blair J. Conley (1986–1989)
46. Glenda M. Kelly (1989–1994)
47. Larry R. Stobbs (1994–2002)
48. David J. Jones (2002–2006)
49. Ken Shearin (2006–2010)
50. Bill Falkner (2010–2018)
51. Bill McMurray (2018–2022)
52. John Josendale (2022–2026)
53. Larry Miller (2026-Present)
