= 11th Missouri Infantry Regiment (Union) =

- Active: August 6, 1861, to January 15, 1866
- Country: (United States) Union
- Allegiance: Missouri
- Branch: Infantry
- Nickname: "Missouri Rifles" (early war)
- Engagements: Battle of Fredericktown; Battle of New Madrid; Battle of Island Number Ten; Expedition to Fort Pillow; Siege of Corinth; Skirmish at Clear Creek; Expedition to Rienzi; Battle of Iuka; 2nd Battle of Corinth; Grant's Mississippi Central Campaign; Battle at Mississippi Springs; Battle of Jackson; Siege of Vicksburg (Assaults on May 19 and May 22); Battle at Mechanicsburg; Battle of Satartia; Action at Richmond; Smith's Expedition to Tupelo; Battle of Pontotoc; Camargo's Cross Roads; Battle of Old Town Creek; Battle of Hurricane Creek; Battle of Abbeville; Pursuit of Price; Battle of Nashville; Pursuit of John Bell Hood; Siege of Spanish Fort and Fort Blakeley; Assault on Fort Blakeley; Occupation of Mobile

The 11th Missouri Infantry Regiment was an infantry regiment that served in the Union Army during the American Civil War.

== Service ==
The 11th Missouri Infantry Regiment was organized at Jefferson Barracks at St. Louis, Missouri, and mustered in for three years on August 6, 1861. In its early history, the regiment was known as the "Missouri Rifles".

Moved to Cape Girardeau, Missouri, August 16, 1861. Attached to Military District of Cairo, Ill., Dept. of Missouri, to February 1862. 2nd Brigade, 1st Division, Army of Mississippi, to March 1862. 2nd Brigade, 5th Division, Army of Mississippi, to April 1862. 1st Brigade, 3rd Division, Army of Mississippi, to April 1862. 2nd Brigade, 2nd Division, Army of Mississippi, to November 1862. 2nd Brigade, 8th Division, Left Wing 13th Army Corps (Old), Dept. of the Tennessee, to December 1862. 2nd Brigade, 8th Division, 16th Army Corps, to April 1863. 2nd Brigade, 3rd Division, 15th Army Corps, Army of the Tennessee, to December 1863. 2nd Brigade, 1st Division, 16th Army Corps, to December 1864. 2nd Brigade, 1st Division (Detachment), Army of the Tennessee, Dept. of the Cumberland, to February 1865. 2nd Brigade, 1st Division, 16th Army Corps (New), Military Division West Mississippi, to August 1865. District of Alabama to December 1865.

== Detailed service ==
Duty at Cape Girardeau, Missouri, until February 1862. Expedition to Perryville, Missouri, August 27 – September 2, 1861. Dallas, Missouri, September 2. Expedition against Thompson's Forces and operations about Ironton and Fredericktown October 12–25. Action at Fredericktown October 21. Expedition beyond Whitewater River November 30 – December 5. Moved from Cape Girardeau to Commerce, Missouri, February 26, 1862. Operations against New Madrid, Missouri, February 28 – March 14, and against Island Number Ten, Mississippi River, March 15 – April 8. Pleasant Point March 7. At New Madrid, Missouri, until April 13. Expedition to Fort Pillow, Tennessee, April 13–17. Moved to Hamburg Landing April 18–22. Advance on and siege of Corinth, Mississippi., April 29 – May 30. Action at Farmington, Mississippi, May 9. Near Corinth May 24. Pursuit to Booneville, Mississippi, May 31 – June 12, At Clear Creek, near Corinth, until August 18. Expedition to Rienzi, Mississippi, June 30 – July 1. March to Tuscumbia, Alabama, August 18–23. March to Iuka, Mississippi, September 2–5, and to Clear Creek September 12–13. Reconnaissance to Iuka and skirmish September 14–16. March to Jacinto, Mississippi, September 18. Battle of Iuka September 19. Pursuit of Price September 20–25. At Rienzi until September 30. March to Corinth September 30 – October 3. 2nd Battle of Corinth October 3–4. Pursuit to Ripley October 5–12. At Corinth until November 2. March to Grand Junction November 2–4. Grant's Central Mississippi Campaign November 4, 1862, to January 10, 1863. Moved from Corinth to Germantown, Tennessee, January 20–21, 1863. To Memphis, Tennessee, February 10; thence to Helena, Arkansas, and Young's Point, Louisiana, and Ducksport, Louisiana, February 13–20, and duty there until May 1863. Moved to Join army in rear of Vicksburg, Mississippi, via Richmond and Grand Gulf May 2–14. Mississippi Springs May 12. Jackson, Mississippi, May 14. Siege of Vicksburg May 18 – July 4. Assaults on Vicksburg May 19 and 22. Expedition to Mechanicsburg and Satartia June 2–8. Mechanicsburg June 4. Satartia June 7. Moved to Young's Point, Louisiana, June. Expedition to Richmond, Louisiana, June 14–16. Action at Richmond June 15. Moved to Big Black River Bridge July 5. Outpost duty there until October. McPherson's Expedition to Canton, Mississippi, October 14–20. Bogue Chitto Creek October 17. Moved to Memphis, thence to LaGrange, Tennessee, November 8–13. Scout after Nathan Bedford Forrest December 1–3. Expedition after Forest December 21–24. At LaGrange until January 26, 1864. Moved to Memphis, Tennessee, thence to Vicksburg, Mississippi, February 2–5. Camp at Big Black until February 27. March to Canton February 27–29, thence to Vicksburg March 1–4. Veterans moved to St. Louis March 10–16. Moved to Memphis, Tennessee, May 2–5. Expedition to Madison, St. Francis County, Arkansas, June 3–7. Guard working party Memphis to LaGrange June 16–27. Smith's Expedition to Tupelo, July 5–21. Pontotoc July 11. Camargo's Cross Roads, near Harrisburg, July 13. Tupelo July 14–15. Old Town Creek July 15. Expedition to Oxford, Mississippi, August 1–30. Near Abbeville August 12. Hurricane Creek, College Hill, August 21. Abbeville August 23. Moved from Memphis to Duvall's Bluff, Arkansas, September 2–8. Moved to Brownsville September 10–11. March through Arkansas and Missouri in pursuit of Price September 17 – November 13. Moved to Nashville, Tennessee, November 24 – December 1. Battle of Nashville December 15–16. Pursuit of John Bell Hood's army to the Tennessee River December 17–28. At Clifton, Tennessee, and Eastport, Mississippi, until February 7, 1865. Moved to New Orleans, Louisiana, February 7–22; thence to Dauphin Island, Alabama, March 5. Campaign against Mobile, Alabama, and its Defenses March 19 – April 12. Siege of Spanish Fort and Fort Blakeley March 26 – April 8. Assault and capture of Fort Blakeley April 9. Occupation of Mobile April 12. March to Montgomery, Alabama, April 13–25, thence to Selma May 10–14, and to Demopolis, Alabama, May 18–19. Duty there until July 15. Duty by Detachments at Tuscaloosa, Marion, Greensboro, Alabama, and Uniontown until October. At Demopolis until December 24. Moved to Memphis, Tennessee, December 24–25. Mustered out January 15, 1866.

== Casualties ==
Regiment lost during service 6 Officers and 98 Enlisted men killed and mortally wounded and 2 Officers and 179 Enlisted men by disease. Total 285.

== Commanders ==
- Brig Gen David Bayles
- Colonel Joseph Plummer
- Brevt Maj Gen Joseph Mower
- Colonel Andrew J. Webber
- Colonel William L. Barnum
- Brevt Brig Gen Eli Bowyer

== See also ==
- Missouri Civil War Union units
- Missouri in the Civil War
- List of American Civil War brevet Generals (Union)
