= C. Carroll Marsh =

Charles Carroll Marsh
- Born: September 17, 1829; Oswego, New York, U.S.
- Died: October 2, 1904 (aged 75); East Oakland, Oakland, California, U.S.
- Burial place: Mountain View Cemetery, Oakland
- Military career
- Allegiance: United States of America; Union
- Branch: United States Army; Union Army
- Service years: 1861-1863
- Rank: Brigadier General, U.S.V. Colonel, U.S.V.
- Commands: 20th Illinois Infantry Regiment
- Conflicts: American Civil War: Battle of Fredericktown; Battle of Fort Henry; Battle of Fort Donelson; Battle of Shiloh; Siege of Corinth
- Other work: lawyer

Charles Carroll Marsh was a Union Army officer during the American Civil War. He served with distinction early in the war at the battles of Fort Donelson and Shiloh. He is commonly referred to as "C. Carrol Marsh" in official reports.

== Early life ==
Charles Carroll Marsh was born in Oswego, New York in 1829. In 1853 he moved to Chicago, Illinois to study law. The legal profession was too crowded for Marsh and his studies lasted only a year before pursuing other business ventures. He joined the Chicago Light Guard becoming captain in that organization.

== Civil War ==
=== Early Battles ===
Due to the reputation of the Chicago Light Guard, Marsh was called to Springfield, Illinois at the outset of the Civil War. Eager to offer his services, he responded quickly and was given command of the 20th Illinois Volunteer Infantry Regiment. Marsh and his command were transported to Cape Girardeau, Missouri and attached to Colonel Joseph B. Plummer's command at the Battle of Fredericktown.

=== Fort Donelson ===
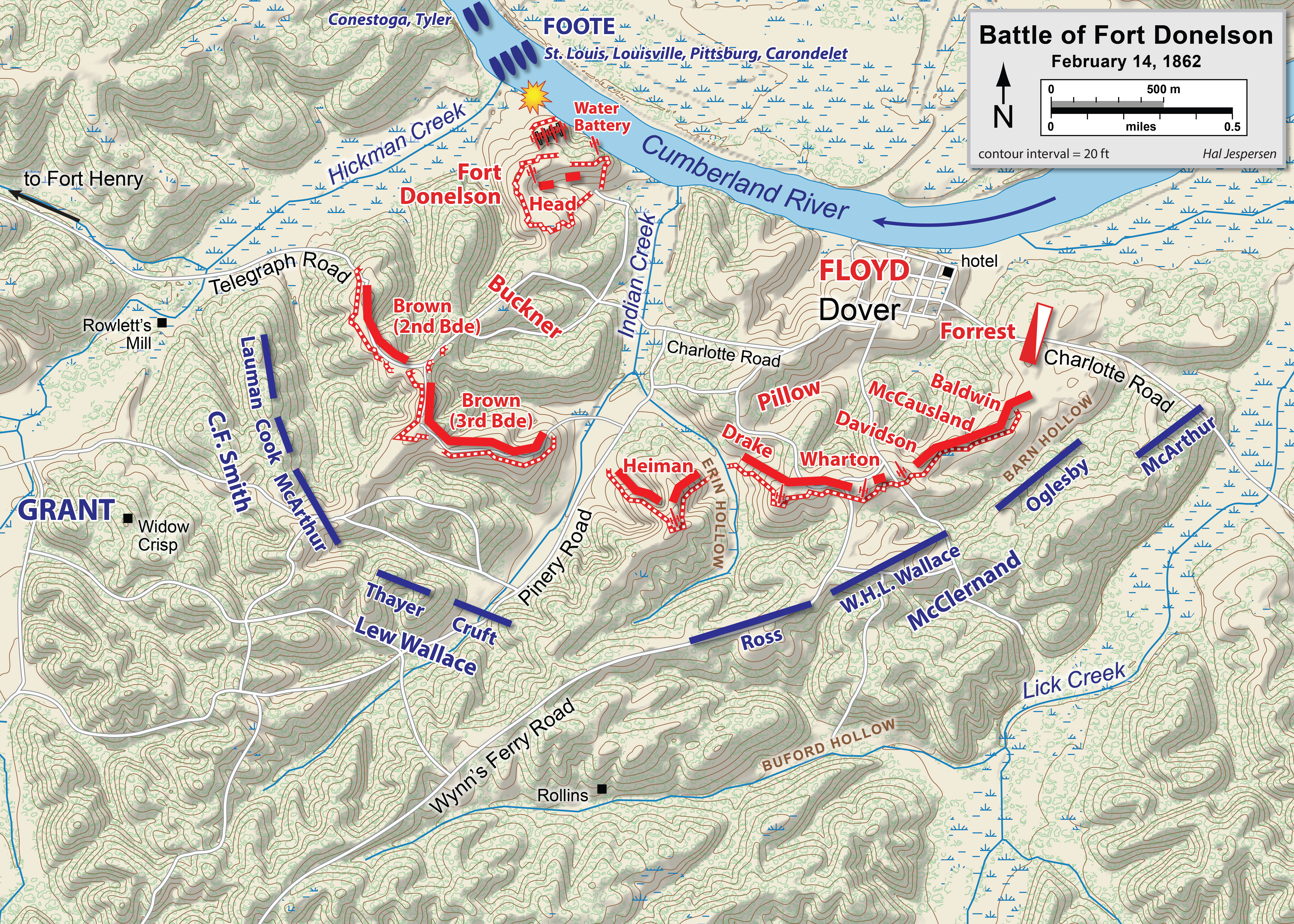
Position of Marsh (WHL Wallace's Brigade) on the morning of February 15

Colonel Marsh and the 20th were stationed at Bird's Point, Missouri until joining Ulysses S. Grant's expedition to Fort Henry as a part of W. H. L. Wallace's 2nd Brigade in John A. McClernand's 1st Division. At the battle of Fort Donelson Marsh was positioned on the right of the Union lines. McClernand's entire division was hit hard during the Confederate breakout attempt on February 15. Despite being hard pressed Marsh managed a counterattack which momentarily checked Simon B. Buckner's division and saved an Illinois artillery battery from capture.

=== Shiloh ===
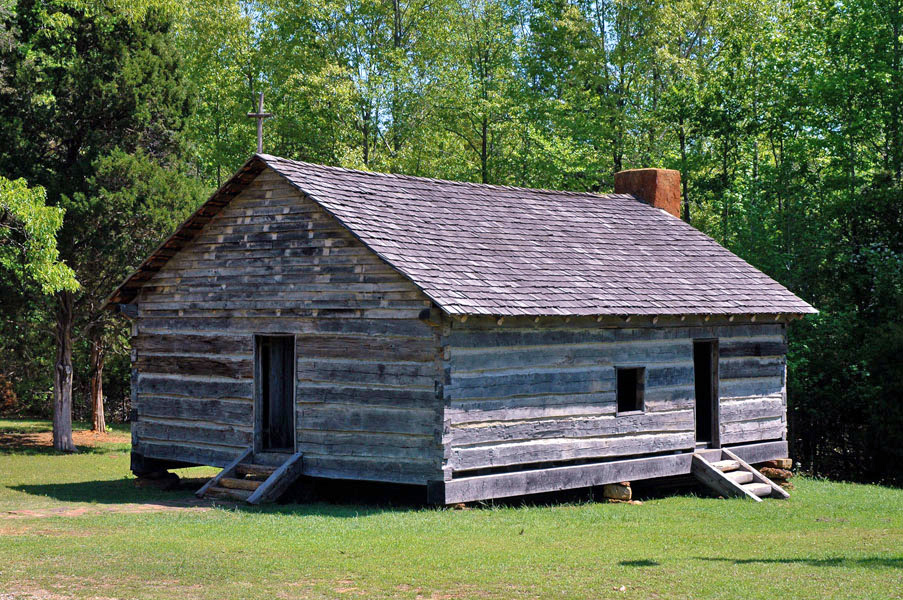
Marsh fought in the vicinity of Shiloh Church on both days of the battle

Following the victory at Fort Donelson, General Ulysses S. Grant was thrust into the public eye and at the same came under attack from department commander Henry W. Halleck. During this time Colonel Marsh and others presented Grant with an ivory-handled sword. Marsh took the occasion to publicly profess his confidence in General Grant and denounced the "jealousy caused by his recent success". He assumed command of the 2nd Brigade when recently promoted Brig. Gen. W.H.L. Wallace took command of the 2nd Division. On the morning of April 6, 1862 messengers managed to alert Colonel Abraham M. Hare of the 1st Brigade that a battle was underway but news of the fighting had not reached Marsh until a cannonball soared through his brigade's camp. Early in the fighting Marsh's brigade was forced into a disorderly retreat until he and General McClernand managed to rally units of the 1st Division behind Shiloh Church. Marsh then led a counterattack which managed to overrun a Confederate battery but proved costly. Once again Marsh was forced to withdraw his dwindling command. Around 5:00pm he made a final stand supported by remnants of three other brigades. On April 7 he led his brigade in recapturing lost ground in the vicinity of Shiloh Church where he had seen action the day before.

=== Post Shiloh and Resignation ===
Following the battle of Shiloh Marsh commanded his brigade until the beginning days of the Siege of Corinth and was transferred to command the 3rd Brigade, 1st Division stationed at Jackson, Tennessee. He was appointed brigadier general of U.S. Volunteers dated November 29, 1862, though his appointment was later withdrawn. He was transferred to command the 1st Brigade in John A. Logan's 3rd Division of the XVII Corps in the opening stages of Grant's First Vicksburg Campaign. Marsh resigned on April 22, 1863.

== Sources ==
- Daniel, Larry J. Shiloh: The Battle That Changed the Civil War. New York: Simon & Schuster, 1997. ISBN 0-684-80375-5.
- Eicher, John H., and David J. Eicher. Civil War High Commands. Stanford, CA: Stanford University Press, 2001. ISBN 0-8047-3641-3
- Gott, Kendall D. Where the South Lost the War: An Analysis of the Fort Henry—Fort Donelson Campaign, February 1862. Mechanicsburg, PA: Stackpole Books, 2003. ISBN 0-8117-0049-6.
- Wilson, James Grant Biographical Sketches of Illinois Officers Engaged in the War Against the Rebellion of 1861. Nabu Press, 2010. ISBN 1-143-01912-1
