= Carlin Party =

Carlin Party expedition
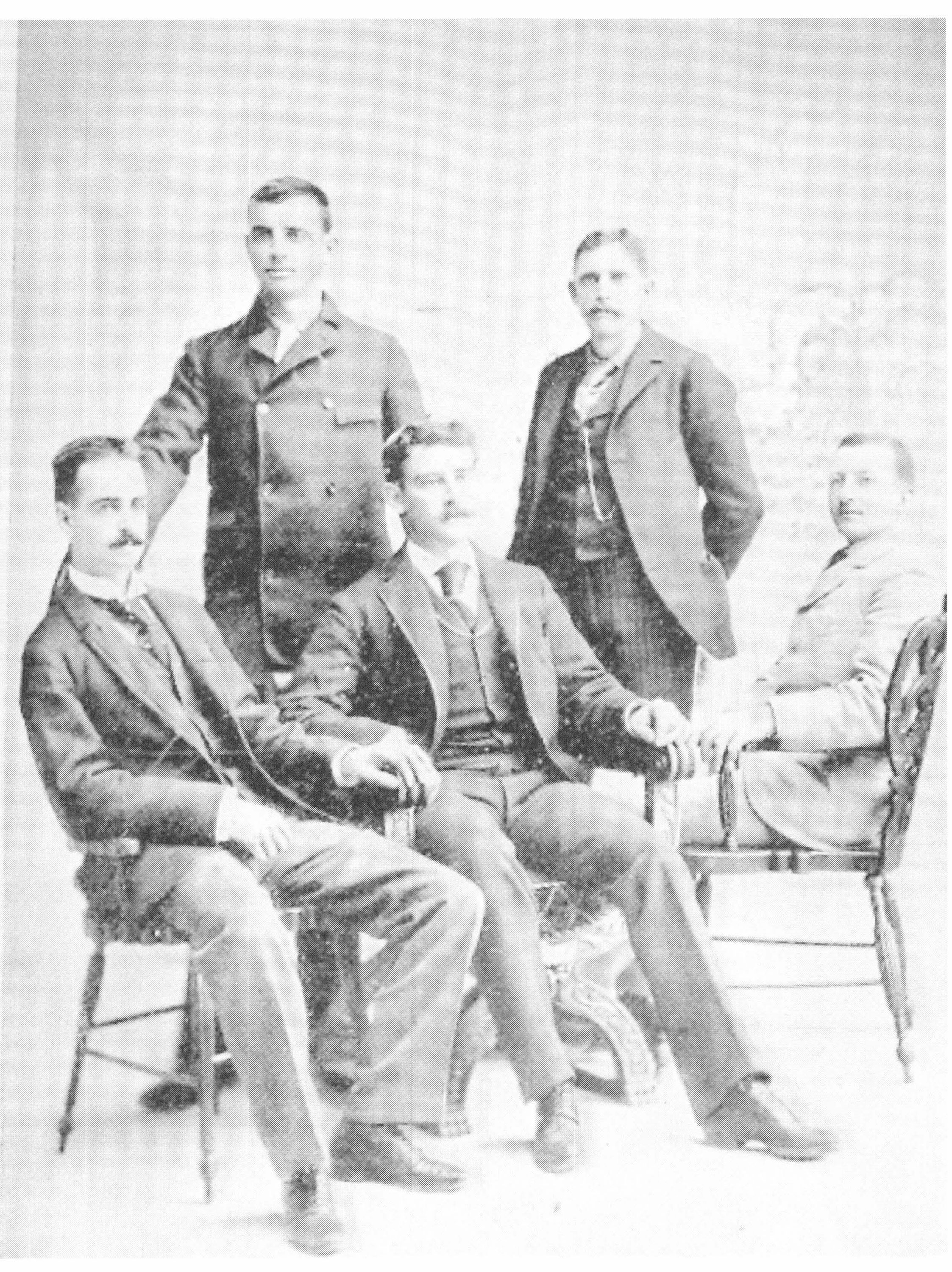
- The surviving members of the Carlin Party in Spokane, December 1893 (left to right: John Pierce, Ben Keeley, William E. Carlin, Martin Spencer, and A. L. A. Himmelwright)
- Date: September 18 – November 22, 1893 (remains recovered August 23, 1894)
- Location: Lolo Trail and Lochsa River, Bitterroot Mountains, Idaho County, Idaho, U.S.
- Participants: Hunting party: William E. Carlin, A. L. A. Himmelwright, John H. Pierce, Martin C. Spencer (guide), George Colegate (cook), Ben Keeley (trapper); U.S. Army relief commanders: Capt. George Andrews (25th Infantry); 1st Lt. Clough Overton (4th Cavalry); 1st Lt. Charles P. Elliott (4th Cavalry)
- Outcome: 5 party members rescued near Canyon Creek on November 22, 1893; Abandonment and death of camp cook George Colegate (buried at Colgate Licks on August 23, 1894)
- Deaths: 1 (George Colegate)

The Carlin Party, sometimes referred to as the Carlin-Himmelwright Hunting Party, was the name given to a hunting expedition that left Kendrick, Idaho, on September 18, 1893, and was met and rescued along the Lochsa River on November 22 of that year, after becoming trapped on the upper reaches of the Lochsa by unseasonably early snowfall.

The party's fortunes were widely covered in the contemporary press due to the notoriety of some of the party's members, excitement over the scale of the search parties launched in an attempted rescue, and eventually the death of the party's cook, George Colegate, who was ill, and abandoned by the rest of the party when he was unable to continue the journey down the Lochsa River.

== Party members ==
The hunting party was led by William E. Carlin, the then 27-year-old son of Brigadier General William Carlin. Although contemporary newspapers sometimes mistakenly described the younger Carlin as a West Point graduate, he had instead attended the University of California, Berkeley for two years, where he studied chemistry and photography. While the party would later be referred to disparagingly in regional press as "the New York Men" (implying that they were unfit for the rigors of hunting in the Idaho mountains), Carlin had a significant amount of experience exploring the wilderness of the Pacific Northwest. This included serving as a photographer on Army Lieutenant James A. Leyden's expedition through parts of Idaho and British Columbia.

Carlin was joined by A. L. A. Himmelwright, then 28, a civil engineer from New York who would later write a book detailing his account of the journey, titled, "In the Heart of the Bitterroot Mountains: The Story of the Carlin Hunting Party", originally penned under the pseudonym of "HECLAWA".

John Harvey Pierce, Carlin's brother-in-law from White Plains, New York, was the 3rd hunter who joined the party. Pierce was 20 at the time of the expedition, the son of Dr. H.M. Pierce whose primary occupation was managing his father's investments.

Before setting out the party hired two additional members, a guide named Martin C. Spencer, and a cook from Post Falls who had worked for Carlin on previous expeditions named George Colegate (often written as Colgate in contemporary press accounts). Colegate suffered from an enlarged prostate and chronic inflammation of the bladder, and required the use of a catheter to urinate. While his physician, W. Q. Webb, advised that Colegate only make the trip with his catheters, Colegate left the devices behind.

Midway through their journey the group encountered and hired trapper Ben Keeley to assist them in rafting down the Lochsa river. Keeley would later dispute parts of the accounts of the other members of the party, particularly related to their care for, and abandonment of Colegate.

The party was accompanied by three dogs. Carlin was loaned two bear terriers by a former hunting companion, Fred Palmer, for the purposes of the hunting trip; not knowing their names, the party named them "Montana" and "Idaho." Colegate also brought along his own black spaniel, "Daisy," for hunting grouse. While Montana and Idaho survived the journey (along with a shepherd-hound mix named "Riley" belonging to rescue boatman J. T. Winn), Colegate's spaniel Daisy exhausted herself following the party after Colegate's abandonment and was shot and boiled for broth in Black Canyon on November 17 when the men were starving.

== Hunting expedition ==
Route of the Carlin hunting party (September–November 1893), showing the outbound pack route over the Lolo Trail and upper Doe Creek ridge to Jerry Johnson's cabin, the November 3–11 raft journey down the Lochsa River to Lost Creek, and the survivors' foot march around Black Canyon to their November 22 rescue near Canyon Creek.

The group assembled in Spokane, Washington, on September 15, 1893. There, the hunters met with their guide, Spencer, and their cook, Colegate. The group procured supplies and equipment for their trip, including 125 lb (57 kg). of flour, 30 lb (14 kg) of bacon, 30 lb (14 kg) of sugar, a wall tent, blankets and a long list of other food and equipment.

The group shipped their horses and supplies to Kendrick, Idaho, by freight train, and arrived there by passenger train on September 17. At 1:00 in the afternoon the following day, the expedition departed.

On September 20, the party reached Weippe, Idaho, on a route that would loosely follow the route taken by the Lewis and Clark Expedition. The group purchased additional food supplies and encountered a local farmer who questioned their ability to complete the trip before the winter snows came. In his 1895 book, Himmelwright wrote that the guide Spencer replied, "we got out last year as late as the 20th of October, and we figure on getting out this time by the 15th."

Meanwhile, in Post Falls on September 20, Colegate's wife Fannie discovered his box of three catheters in a bureau drawer and telegraphed Dr. Webb in Spokane, who wired back instructions to send someone to Kendrick immediately to intercept the party. Colegate's 16-year-old son Charles traveled by train to Kendrick on September 22, but learned that the hunters had departed four days earlier and were already beyond reach in the mountains. On the advice of locals, Charles left the box of catheters at the desk of the St. Elmo Hotel in Kendrick in case the party returned.

After waiting out a rainstorm at Brown's Creek on September 21, the Carlin party left the wagon road at Musselshell Creek on September 22 and ascended the Lolo Trail past Snowy Summit (6,026 ft (1,837 m)), where six inches of snow lay on the ground. Camping near Weitas Meadows (September 23) and Bald Mountain (September 24), the group reached the Indian Post Office rock cairns (7,033 ft (2,144 m)) on September 25, where Spencer measured the average snow depth to be 8 inches.

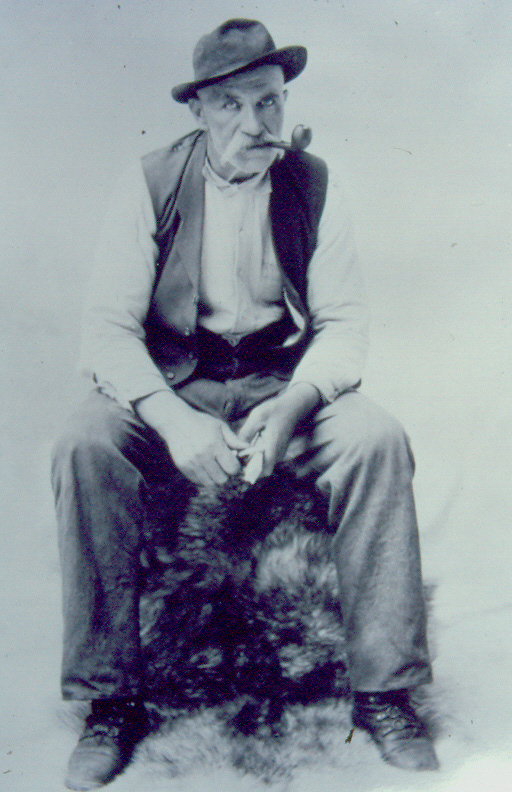
Prospector and trapper Jerry Johnson, whom the hunting party met near the modern-day Jerry Johnson Campground.

On September 26, the group rode roughly 1.5 mi (2.4 km) east of Indian Post Office before turning south off the Lolo Trail down an old Indian trail along the Doe Creek ridge (now upper USFS Road 566 and USFS Trail 38, the Jerry Johnson Trail), which switchbacked down a steep burned bluff to the Lochsa River near modern-day Jerry Johnson Hot Springs. During this descent, Himmelwright wrote that Colegate became exhausted, and alarmed other members of the party with his considerably swollen feet and legs. However, Colegate assured the party that he needed nothing more than rest. Near the hot springs, the group met the prospector and trapper Jerome "Jerry" Johnson, and his partner Ben Keeley who were building cabins and planning to overwinter at that location, as well as two hunters from Missoula who were planning to return home in the coming days. The group found a nearby campsite by the Lochsa river, and spent a week hunting elk in the area.

== Snowed in ==
On October 2, Colegate revealed the true nature of his illness — and the fact that he had not brought his catheters on the expedition — to the group. Around that same time, the guide Spencer shared fears that the group might be snowed in, due to ongoing rain at their lower elevation that he expected was snow blocking their return route at higher elevations.

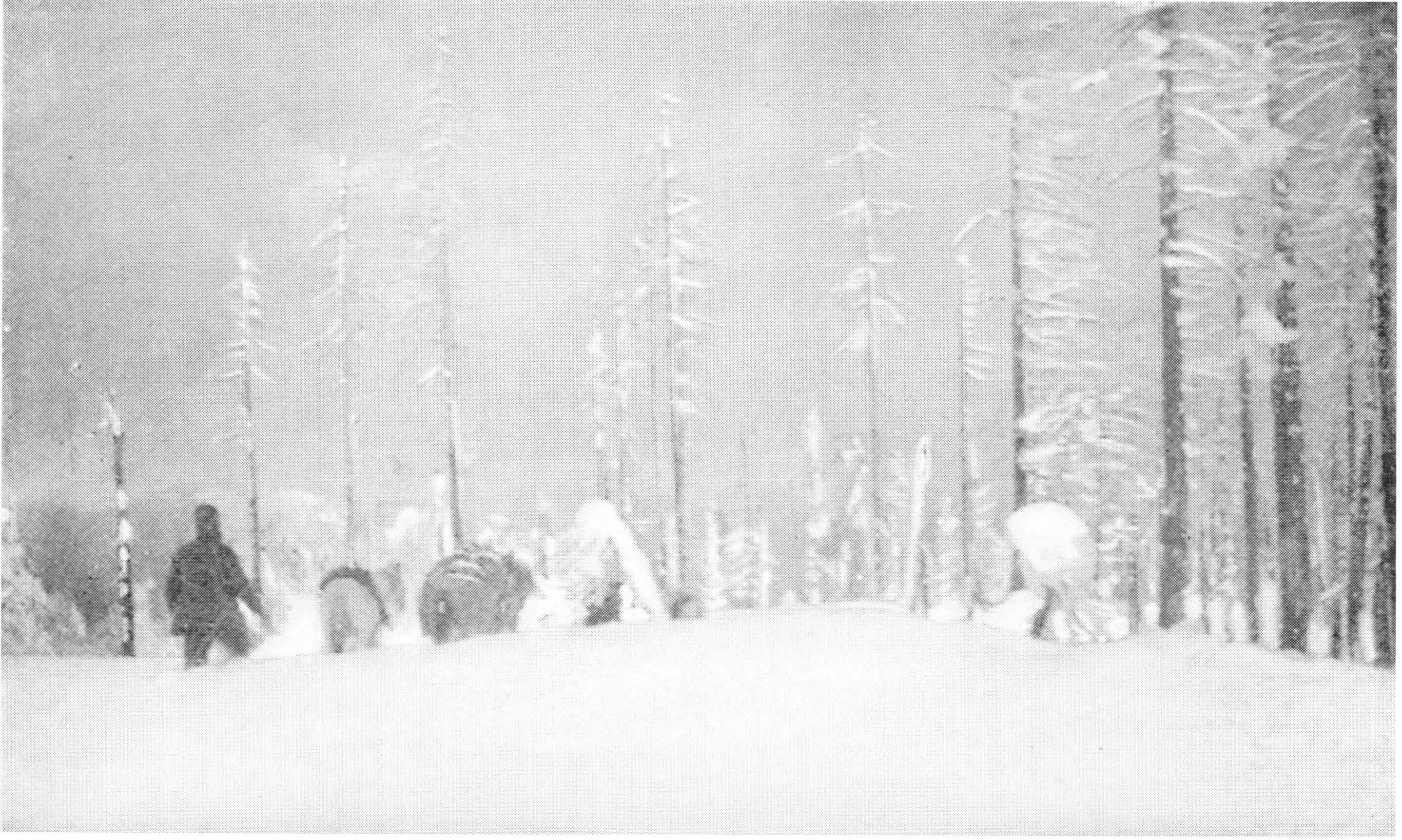
The Carlin Party Returns to the Lochsa after a Failed Attempt to Pack Out on October 10th, 1893

By October 6, Colegate's condition had worsened, and the group discussed either sending Colegate and Spencer back early, or returning altogether. By October 9, they had resolved to return to Kendrick together, and saddled the horses and attempted the return route on October 10. By noon, the group reached an area where the snow on the trail was 3-feet deep, and the guide Spencer predicted that continuing along this trail would soon mean abandoning the horses, and walking out. As Colegate was too ill to walk, the group realized this plan "involved almost certain starvation for the entire party or the eventual abandonment of Colegate to save our own lives."

The party returned to their camp, resolved to build rafts and float them down the Lochsa river to civilization. While the guide Spencer expressed skepticism at this course of action, they believed it to be the only chance they had of bringing Colegate out alive. The party then purchased the supplies, and assistance of the trapper Ben Keeley, and spent several additional days helping Jerry Johnson to finish his cabin where they hoped to store their un-needed gear and hunting trophies over the winter.

On October 15, the group began felling cedar trees to build rafts for their attempt down the Lochsa. Because there was no winter forage in the canyon for their ten horses, Spencer and Pierce drove the animals back up the mountain trail to the snowline on October 16 and turned them loose in the hope that they could forage on the ridges; although two horses briefly wandered back down to camp and broke into the party's flour supply, all ten ultimately perished during the winter. By October 30, the men had completed two rafts, each approximately 26 ft (7.9 m) long, and 4 ft 2 in (1.27 m) wide. The group proposed leaving Colegate with Jerry Johnson, and sending a relief party after him. But Johnson refused. Unsure of their ability to survive their evacuation attempt, the group left letters with Johnson which he was to deliver the following summer when he went to Missoula. After once again confirming that the trail was impassable due to snow, the group launched their rafts on November 3.

== Rafting down the Lochsa ==
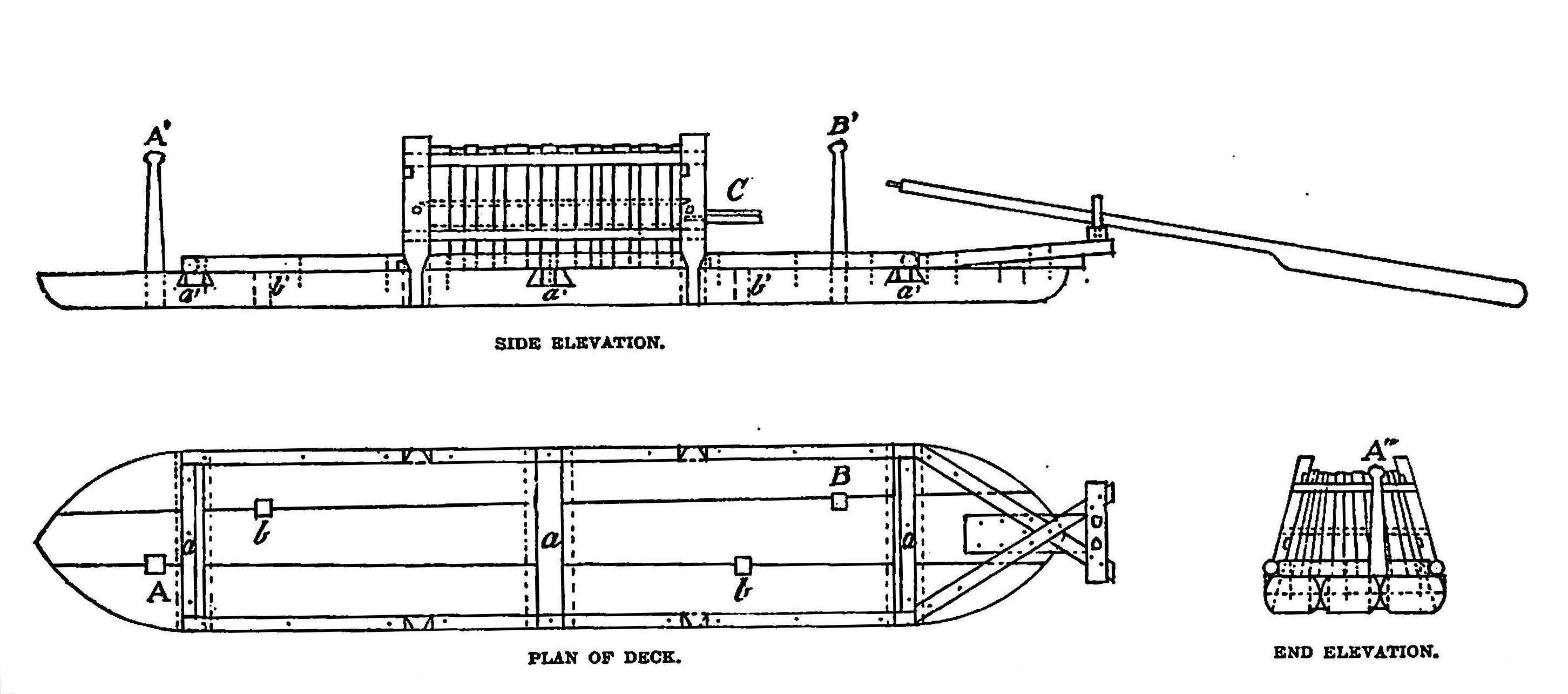
A diagram of the rafts used by the Carlin Party, drawn by A.L.A. Himmelwright

On the first day of the expedition's raft journey down the Lochsa, November 3, a raft was pinned on two rocks and Pierce, Colegate and one of the expedition's dogs, Montana, were all thrown from the rafts. All three were rescued. The group returned additional items to Johnson's cabin in an effort to lighten their load on November 4, and continued their journey down the Lochsa on November 5. Progress was slow, and by November 6, the group estimated that they had made no more than 10 mi (16 km) of progress.

Over the following days, the group attempted to float less difficult rapids, and guided the rafts from the shore using ropes through more difficult passages. At times, they portaged their supplies overland, not trusting even them to the river. During this time, they observed Colegate "failing very rapidly in strength and mind."

By Saturday, November 11, the group believed themselves to be "stuck." In the river, they faced rocks past which the rafts could not pass. Their provisions were low, and they had found little success fishing or hunting for game. The only way forward was overland through steep canyon walls and dense brush. Colegate was unable to walk, and the group did not believe it was possible for them to carry him across the rough terrain.

== Abandonment of Colegate ==
It was at this point that the party made the decision that would lead to their infamy: choosing to abandon George Colegate while he was still alive, yet unable to proceed on the journey down the river.

Afterwards, A.L.A. Himmelwright would take a lead role in defending the party's decision, first in newspaper articles and then later in the book he wrote on the expedition.

The group's justifications were primarily that they believed Colegate to be "hours from death", that to wait with Colegate longer would have further endangered the lives of the remaining expedition's members, and that he was so ill that he was unable to appreciate "efforts that have been made to make him comfortable".

Himmelwright's later account of the journey did not mention the specifics of the supplies that the group left with Colegate, apart from tying blankets to Colegate to keep him warm in what they believed to be his last hours. In one interview given to the New York Times, Himmelwright would claim the group divided their food with Colegate. However, in an interview with The Weekly Missoulian, Ben Keeley stated that the group left him with a blanket, matches and salt, a tin cup and fishing tackle, but no food.

On November 13, the group left an unresponsive, unmoving Colegate, and proceeded downriver on foot.

== Search parties and rescue ==
Routes of the three November 1893 U.S. Army relief expeditions converging on the Lochsa River: Capt. George Andrews (25th Infantry) from Fort Missoula via Lolo Pass, Lt. Clough Overton (4th Cavalry) from Fort Walla Walla via Weippe and the Lolo Trail, and 1st Lt. Charles P. Elliott (4th Cavalry) via Kooskia and up the Lochsa River by hand-built cedar boats.

Concern over the party's fate was first raised by William Wright, a guide who had previously worked with Spencer. On November 7, Wright wrote to a contact in Spokane, "If Spencer has not got out of the mountains before now, he will not get out before spring [...] General Carlin had better send out a relief party to hunt them up."

Wright's contact passed the letter on to an army commander in Fort Spokane, who telegraphed his superior General William Carlin at Fort Vancouver. General Carlin replied:

Thanks for information. If possible, go to Missoula and ask Colonel Burt, commandant at Fort Missoula, for a party of men, pack animals and subsistence and guide, and go in relief of Will and party. I will pay the expenses.

Over the next several days, three separate search parties were launched at General Carlin's direction.

=== The Missoula search party ===
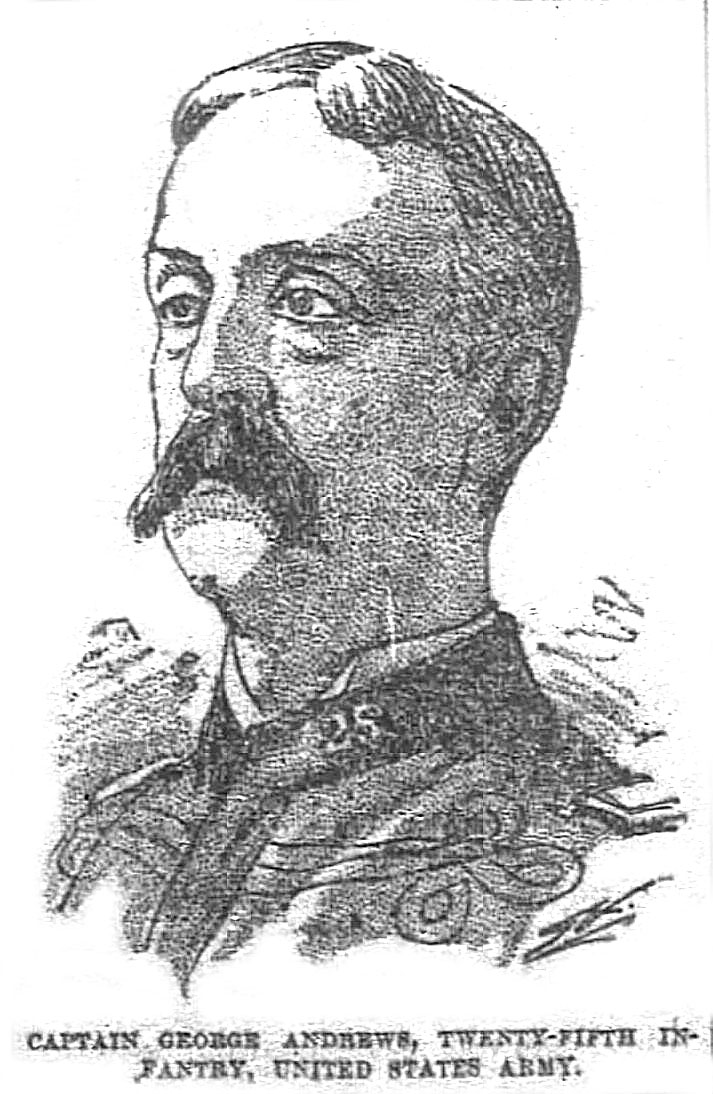
Captain George Andrews, Twenty-Fifth Infantry, United States Army, illustration published in the San Francisco Chronicle, December 10, 1893.

Captain Louis Merriam of Fort Spokane arrived in Missoula on November 10 to organize a search party that would depart from Missoula, approach Lolo pass from the East and then move down towards the presumed location of the party on the Lochsa river.

The Missoula search party was led by Captain George Andrews with Company H of the 25th Infantry, a regiment of African American Buffalo Soldiers stationed at Fort Missoula, and guided by Spencer's partner William Wright. The plan was to push as far as possible towards the presumed location of the lost hunting party with wagons, pack animals and supplies, after which a smaller party would proceed on snowshoes if necessary.

The party left Missoula on November 10. Pushing through waist-deep drifts past Lolo Pass, Andrews and a small snowshoe detachment reached the upper Lochsa River on November 15, but a severe blizzard and dwindling rations forced them to turn back on November 17. By November 21, newspapers reported that the rescuers had been forced to retreat "in danger of their own lives."

=== The Overton search party ===
Following General Carlin's orders, Lieutenant Clough Overton of the 4th Cavalry, based out of the Vancouver barracks, led a search party that passed through Colfax, Washington on November 10, and then continued on to Weippe, Idaho. The Overton party would proceed up the Lolo Trail following the same route the hunting party took on their outward journey.

Overton's party was guided by a local trapper, hunter, and prospector Thomas Beall, who was described as having more than 30-years of experience in the region where the Carlin party was presumed lost. The Overton party consisted of "a detail of troopers, packers, six horses and six mules." The party's plan was to "head to Lolo pass and establish a camp" from which they would "radiate on snow shoes in all directions seeking traces of the unfortunate men."

Overton was supported by Lieutenant Gordon Voorhies of the 4th Cavalry, out of Fort Walla Walla. Lieutenant Voorhies arrived in Lewiston on November 15 with a detachment of 21 men, as well as three wagons and provisions. Voorhies's objective was to establish a camp to supply provisions for Overton and the other parties in the region searching for the missing hunters. While the Overton search party was not ultimately successful in locating the lost hunters, reaching Beaver Dam Saddle near Snowy Summit on snowshoes on November 18 before being ordered back to Weippe, they played a supporting role in Lieutenant Elliott's successful search.

=== The Elliott search party ===
First Lieutenant Charles Elliott of the 4th Cavalry led a search party that originated from Kendrick, Idaho, and proceeded East and eventually up the Lochsa river towards the presumed location of the lost hunting party.

Elliott originally planned to lead a search party from Kendrick, Idaho, was briefly directed to start from Missoula, then sent back to Kendrick due to a washout on the railroad between Spokane and Missoula.

The search party left Kendrick, Idaho, on November 13, and shortly overtook the Overton party at Weippe, Idaho. Advised by Weippe settler John Gaffney to ascend the Lochsa River rather than the snowbound Lolo Trail, Elliott traveled south via Greer's Ferry, Kamiah, and Kooskia to Pete King Creek, where his crew whipsawed cedar planks and built two 26 ft (7.9 m) boats that were completed on November 20.

During this same time, the remaining members of the Carlin party were continuing downriver, largely out of food and subsisting on the little fish and game they could successfully obtain.

The Elliott party started upriver with the boats and other supplies on November 21.

=== Rescue and return ===
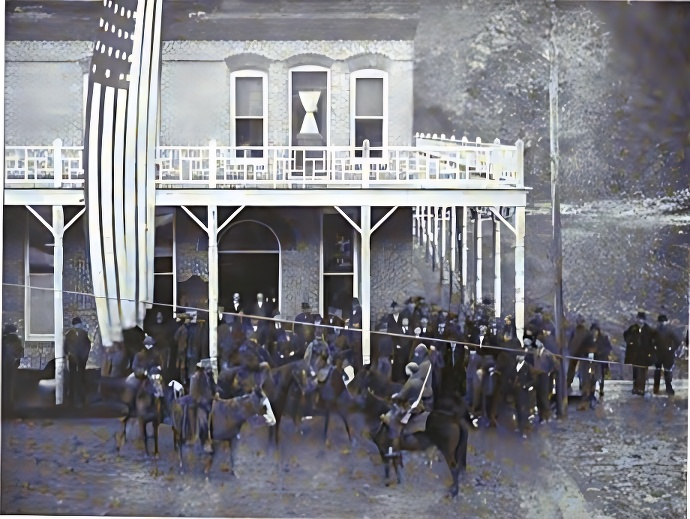
The Carlin Party in Kendrick after their rescue.

On November 22, after repairing their boats and poling upriver to a rocky point near Canyon Creek (near modern-day Apgar Campground), Elliott's party encountered the surviving members of the Carlin party hiking down the river.

Elliott first saw one of the Carlin party's terriers appear above the rocks, and his boatman reached for his gun before realizing it was a dog. Spencer next appeared, and Elliott asked, "Hello! Who in God's name are you?"

Spencer replied, "My name is Spencer, the guide of the Carlin party. Who are you?"

Elliott informed Spencer he was with a party sent to rescue them, and then asked, "How is everybody?"

Spencer replied, "All well, but hungry as hell."

Lieutenant Elliott dispatched a runner to Kendrick with a telegram to General Carlin which read:

"Falls of North Fork of Middle Fork of Clearwater — Carlin party was found on river today. Carlin, Spencer, Pierce and Himmelwright are well. Colgate is lost. Kelly [sic] joined them in the mountains and will work down the river by boat."

— The Salt Lake Herald, November 26, 1893

Initial newspaper accounts described the men as "in most pitiable condition" and reported that they could have "scarcely survived 36 hours longer without relief."

This somewhat contradicts Himmelwright's own account of the days before the rescue, who wrote that while the party was low on provisions, on November 21, the surviving members of the party shared "a little piece of bacon" for breakfast, caught and ate three fish around 11:00 AM, and then a further six fish later in the day.

After learning about the abandonment of Colegate nine days earlier, Elliott initially planned to continue up the river to recover either him or his remains, but the surviving members of the Carlin party convinced him that "such a course was not only extremely dangerous but probably improbable."

In a later defense of their actions printed in the New York Times, Himmelwright stated that,

"The snow fell the day after we met Elliott, and ice floes were forming in the river at that time. These, coupled with other conditions, would have made trip up the river and through the canyon in search of Colgate at that season of the year extremely hazardous, if at all possible."

Over the coming days, the party returned to Kendrick, Idaho without attempting to search for Colegate. Near Kendrick, Elliott nearly lost his life when his horse bucked, and threw him into a stream where he nearly drowned.

The surviving Carlin party arrived in Spokane on December 2, where they took up lodgings at the Hotel Spokane.

Because Brigadier General William P. Carlin had authorized the relief expeditions' civilian guides, boatmen, snowshoes, and toboggans shortly before his mandatory retirement on November 24, 1893, Quartermaster General R. N. Batchelder and Secretary of War Daniel S. Lamont ruled in November 1894 that General Carlin had lacked authority to incur the expenses and held him personally liable for $1,108.85. General Carlin appealed to Congress, and in February 1896 the House Committee on Military Affairs approved a bill relieving him of the debt.

== Controversy over Colegate ==
The controversy over the party's abandonment of George Colegate began shortly after their return to Spokane.

=== Dr. Webb's statement ===
In an effort to quell early questions about their abandonment of Colegate, the members of the expedition obtained a note from Colegate's physician. The statement ran in the December 7th, 1893 issue of the Spokane Weekly Review, reading, in part:

"Mr. Colegate was troubled with an enlarged prostate and chronic inflammation of the bladder and had been for 20 years, and compelled to use catheters to relieve the bladder. I told him he could make the trip but to continue the use of the catheters, and from the history of the case and symptoms described by the Carlin party, I am satisfied Colgate’s illness would have resulted in fatality under any circumstances, and when he was left behind in the condition described, he could not have survived 24 hours."

=== Keeley's account ===
By December 13, the trapper Ben Keeley had begun to give accounts of the abandonment of Colegate that differed from the narrative of other members of the party. Keeley alleged that he had wanted to leave Colegate with food, but Carlin prevented him from doing so. Further, Keeley alleged that Carlin and his companions had delayed for two weeks after being urged to leave their hunting grounds by Keeley and Spencer, and that the entire river could have been rafted with Colegate had "not the New Yorkers been afraid of getting drowned."

Himmelwright disputed Keeley's version of events, alleging that the "story of Ben Keeley has since proved to be false and malicious by the testimony of all the rest of the party." He blamed Keeley's dissatisfaction on the fact that he had not been granted the reward for the rescue of the party offered by General Carlin, and was in fact suing the General for the reward.

=== Message in a bottle ===
The controversy over Colegate's abandonment was compounded when a message purporting to be written by Colegate was found floating on the Clearwater river on December 27.

The message read:

Bitter Root Mountains, Nov. 27.

I am alive and well. Tell them to come and get me as soon as any one finds this. I am fifty miles from civilization, as near as I can tell. I am George Colgate, one of the lost Carlin party. My legs are better. I can walk some. Come soon. Take this to Kenrick, Idaho, and you will be liberally rewarded. My name is George Colgate, from Post Falls. This bottle came to me one day and I caught it, and write these words to take me out. Direct to the St. Elmo Hotel, Kendrick, Idaho.

GEORGE COLGATE

Good-bye, wife and children.

When a reporter from the New York Times showed the dispatch with the note to Himmelwright, he disputed its veracity, stating:

"There cannot be any truth to it. Colgate must have died long ago [...] he could not have obtained a bottle from the river, as the letter states. To begin with, the river there is full of rocks, and no bottle could get through whole. Then too, where would the bottle come from? Nobody above where Colegate was had a bottle."

== Colegate recovery attempts and burial ==
The 1894 searches for George Colegate and Upper Lochsa River detail, showing the February 1894 winter search by 16-year-old Charles Colegate and Post Falls volunteers, the May–June 1894 searches by Martin Spencer, William Wright, and Ben Keeley from Missoula, and Lt. Charles P. Elliott's August 1894 discovery of Colegate's remains eight miles below the abandonment camp and burial at Colgate Licks (46.464375°N 114.940330°W).

=== First Colegate recovery attempt ===
By January 1894, the citizens of Post Falls had organized an expedition to search for George Colegate, led by his son Charles. Charles and three companions left from Kendrick and made it up the river to a point which they judged to be further than George Colegate's last camp.

They found no evidence of the lost cook.

However, during the expedition one of the party's members, Bill Martin, was injured when a snag fell on him, broke his collar bone, and nearly killed him.

Still, the party managed to rescue the injured rescuer, bringing him back to civilization over the course of several weeks, suggesting that perhaps the Carlin party could have done the same for Colegate.

=== Spencer recovery ===
The first expedition successful in finding evidence of Colegate's remains was led by the Carlin Party's guide, Martin Spencer, in May 1894. The expedition left Missoula on May 21, and reached Jerry Johnson's cabin on June 7. They recovered the Carlin party's trophies and continued on to where the party had abandoned Colegate.

There, Spencer's party found Colegate's unopened bedroll, blankets buried in the sand, and—half a mile downstream—a torn corduroy coat sleeve caught in the water. Spencer concluded that Colegate had died painlessly without opening his bedroll and that high water in the spring thaw had washed his body downstream. A second search party led by Ben Keeley and funded by the Weekly Missoulian searched the same stretch of river shortly afterward, finding nothing further.

=== Elliott’s Recovery and burial of Colegate's remains ===
George Colegate's grave at Colgate Licks (1904–2020)

1904: Photographed by George Ritchey ten years after Lt. Elliott's burial party erected the rock cairn and burned Colegate's name into a cedar headboard.

1909: Photographed by Northern Pacific Railway survey crew member Charles I. Harrison; this image was used to relocate the forgotten cairn on July 19, 1956.

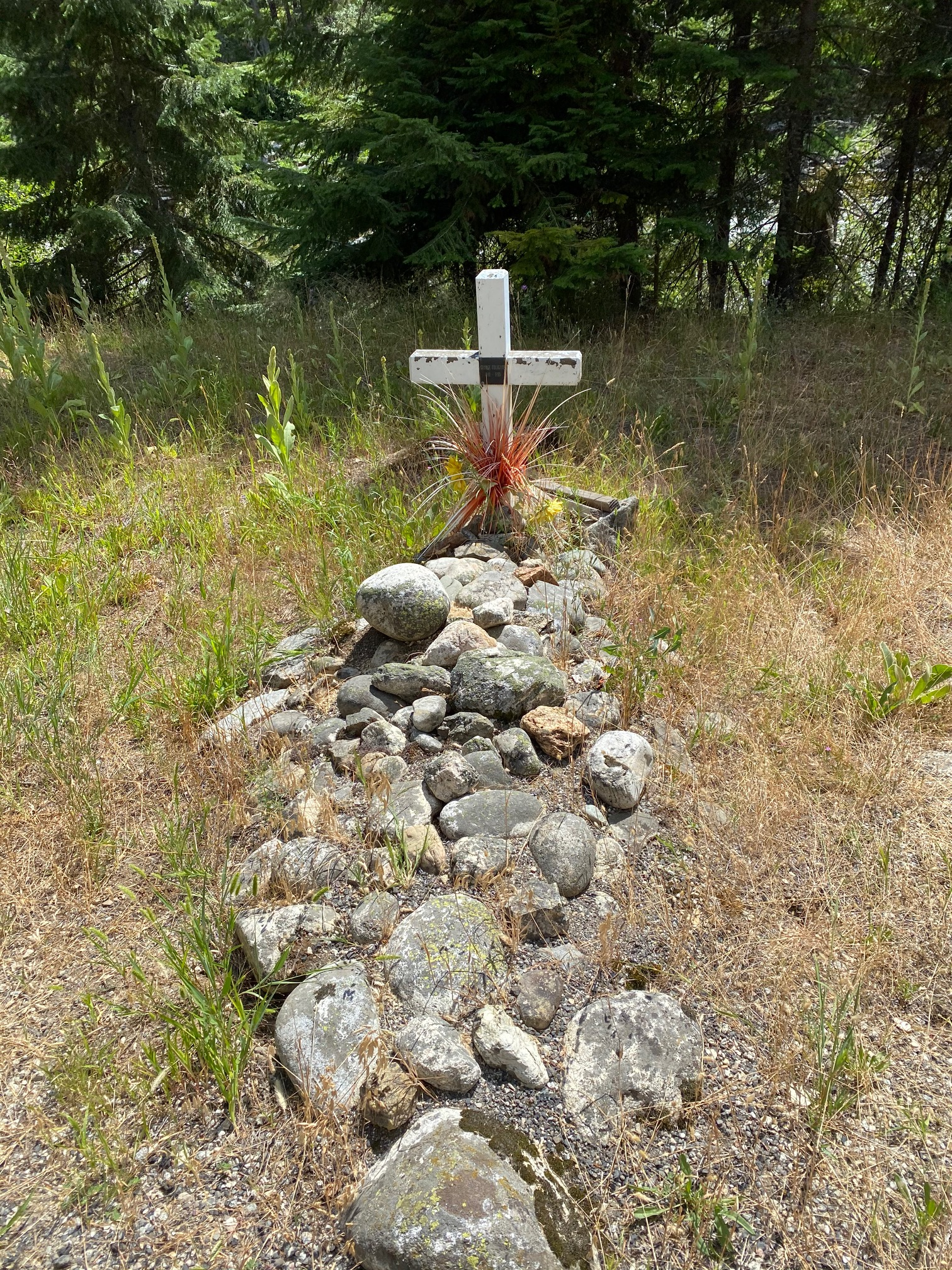
2020: The gravesite as maintained today by the U.S. Forest Service along the Colgate Licks interpretive trail off U.S. Highway 12.

On August 23 of 1894, it was a party led by Lieutenant Elliott who found Colegate's remains, approximately 8 miles below where he had been abandoned. The party found a thigh bone and one leg, "mangled and gnawed by the wild beasts infesting that region."

Elliott's party also found a match box, fishing line and other items belonging to Colegate. They carried his remains back upriver to the lower warm springs (Colgate Licks), near where the Carlin party had built its rafts, buried them under a cairn of river rocks, and burned his name into a wooden headboard.

The grave and its original wooden headboard were photographed during a 1904 Lochsa River fishing trip by Pullman photographer George Ritchey, and again in 1909 by Charles I. Harrison, a mail carrier and photographer for a Northern Pacific Railway survey party. After the wooden headboard rotted away and a 1929 wildfire burned through the cedar grove, the exact location of the grave was forgotten. Although U.S. Forest Service ranger (later Clearwater National Forest Supervisor) Ralph S. Space noticed the mound of rocks while camping near the warm springs in 1924, its identity remained unconfirmed until The Spokesman-Review published Harrison's 1909 photograph in 1956. Space contacted Harrison, who returned to the Lochsa with Forest Service personnel on July 19, 1956, and relocated the cairn using his 1909 photograph. Today, Colegate's gravesite is maintained by the Forest Service beside U.S. Highway 12 at the Colgate Licks interpretive trail.
