= William Carlin =

American general (1829–1903)

William Passmore Carlin
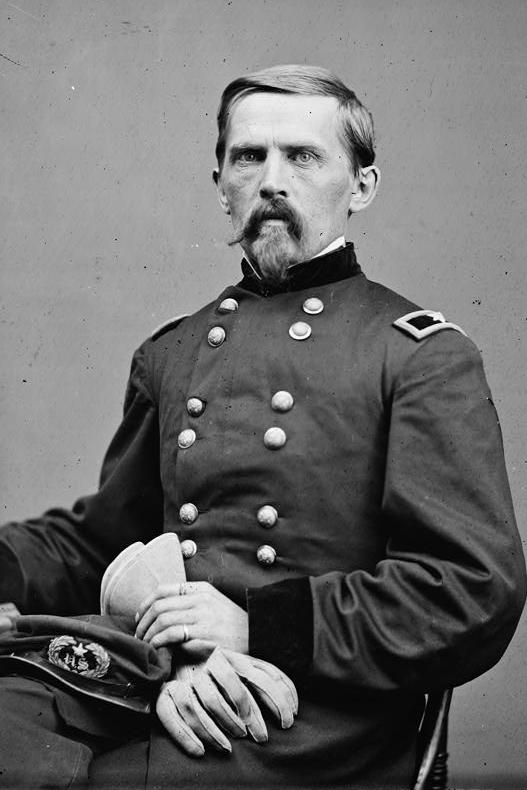
- William P. Carlin
- Born: November 23, 1829; Rich Woods, Greene County, Illinois
- Died: October 4, 1903 (aged 73); Whitehall, Montana
- Burial place: Carrollton City Cemetery, Carrollton, Illinois
- Military career
- Allegiance: United States of America; Union
- Branch: United States Army; Union Army
- Service years: 1850–1893
- Rank: Brevet Major General
- Commands: 38th Illinois Volunteer Infantry; 4th Infantry Regiment; Department of the Columbia
- Conflicts: Plains Indian Wars; Utah War; American Civil War; Battle of Fredericktown; Siege of Corinth; Battle of Perryville; Battle of Stones River; Tullahoma Campaign; Chattanooga campaign; Atlanta campaign; Sherman's March to the Sea; Carolinas campaign

William Passmore Carlin (November 23, 1829 – October 4, 1903) was a career soldier from the state of Illinois who served as a general in the Union Army during the American Civil War and then in the postwar United States Army. He led a brigade and then a division in the Army of the Cumberland in several of the most significant campaigns of the Western Theater of operations.

== Early life ==
William P. Carlin was born at Rich Woods in Greene County, Illinois, and educated in the local schools. His parents were William B. Carlin (1804-1850) and Mary Carlin (née Goode, 1805-1888). His uncle Thomas Carlin, a Jacksonian Democrat and veteran of the War of 1812 served as Illinois' governor when William was a boy. He received an appointment to the United States Military Academy in West Point, New York, and graduated in 1850, ranking 20th out of 44. Among his classmates were future six Civil War generals, including Gouverneur K. Warren and William L. Cabell.

== Early career ==
Carlin was appointed a brevet second lieutenant in the 6th U.S. Infantry and assigned to duty on the Western frontier at Fort Snelling and other subsequent posts. He spent much of the next decade on garrison duty, although he participated in several minor campaigns and expeditions to quell warring Plains Indians, including William S. Harney's 1855 campaign against the Sioux (for which he was promoted to first lieutenant) and the 1857 expedition of Edwin V. Sumner against the Cheyenne tribe. He then was involved in the Utah War in 1858 in a U.S. Army force led by Albert Sidney Johnston, a future Confederate general. Carlin rose to the rank of captain in the Regular Army.

From September 1859 through May 1860, he commanded Fort Bragg in California.

== Civil War ==
Shortly after the outbreak of the Civil War in early 1861, Carlin was commissioned on August 5 by the Governor of Illinois, Richard Yates, as the colonel and first commander of the new 38th Illinois Infantry. He and his regiment were shipped to Missouri to help stabilize the region under Federal control. He participated in the Battle of Fredericktown on October 21, where his men help rout part of the Missouri State Guard under M. Jeff Thompson.

As a reward for his performance, in November Carlin took command of the Southeastern Missouri District, a post he held through the winter into early spring of 1862 when he was assigned to lead a brigade of infantry. He first led his brigade into combat during the Siege of Corinth, Mississippi, in May of that year. Fighting against the Confederates of Braxton Bragg during the autumn Kentucky Campaign, Carlin received multiple commendations for bravery for a successful charge at the Battle of Perryville that almost cut off the Confederate line of retreat, but it was called back, under protest, by his corps commander. After the battle he protested the lack of recognition his command received and privately chided division commander Lovell H. Rousseau for "crawling around trees on his belly [which] is not such conduct as soldiers admire." Carlin was promoted to brigadier general in the Union Army on November 29, 1862. A month later, his brigade in the Army of the Cumberland suffered high casualties during the Battle of Stones River in Tennessee.

For the next year and a half, Carlin commanded the 2nd Brigade, 1st Division of the XX Corps. He participated in the Tullahoma Campaign and the subsequent Battle of Chickamauga. In the autumn of 1863, he fought at Lookout Mountain and Missionary Ridge during the Battles for Chattanooga. In the summer of 1864, he led his brigade in the Atlanta campaign, taking a brief furlough during the campaign to return to Illinois to be married. He was promoted to divisional command before the Battle of Jonesboro in September. He then took part in Sherman's March to the Sea and the capture of Savannah, Georgia.

In early 1865, Carlin's division was involved in the Carolinas campaign. At the Battle of Bentonville on March 19, it conducted a "probing attack" that was routed by a major Confederate counterattack in which General Carlin narrowly escaped capture. At the end of the war, he received brevet appointments to major general in both the volunteer Union Army and the Regular Army.

== Postbellum career ==
Carlin mustered out of the volunteers in the summer of 1865 and returned to the Regular Army as the major of the 16th U.S. Infantry. He was the assistant commissioner of the Tennessee office of the Freedmen's Bureau from 1867 until 1868. He was promoted to colonel in April 1882 and later to brigadier general, and held various commands at army posts throughout the country. He put down a miners' strike in the Idaho Territory and served in several posts in the South during Reconstruction.

Carlin retired from the Army in 1893 after 43 years of service. He wrote and published his autobiography, Memoirs of Brigadier General William Passmore Carlin, USA, which detailed his long career.

Carlin's son, William E. Carlin, was the leader of a hunting party that was lost and rescued by a party dispatched by General Carlin on the Lochsa River in Idaho in 1893.

== Death and legacy ==
While traveling on a train near Whitehall, Montana, in 1903, Carlin died suddenly. His body was shipped home to Carrollton, Illinois, for burial.

The town of Carlin, Nevada, was named for him.

== See also ==
- List of American Civil War generals (Union)
