= Beekman Du Barry =

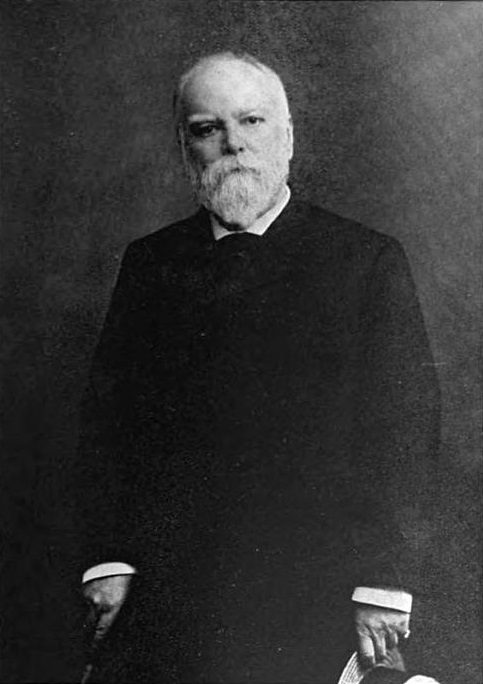
- Beekman Du Barry about 1900
- Born: December 4, 1828; Bordentown, New Jersey, U.S.
- Died: January 12, 1901 (aged 72); Washington, D.C., United States
- Burial place: West Point Cemetery
- Military career
- Allegiance: United States of America; Union
- Branch: United States Army; Union Army
- Service years: 1849–1892
- Rank: Brigadier general
- Commands: 1st Artillery Regiment; 3rd Artillery Regiment; Commissary of Subsistence
- Conflicts: American Civil War

Beekman Du Barry, Sr. (December 4, 1828 – January 12, 1901) was a brigadier general in the United States Army. He briefly participated in the Northern Pacific Railroad Survey of 1853 to 1854, and served with distinction in the Commissary of Subsistence of the Union Army during the American Civil War.

== Early life ==
Beekman Du Barry was born on December 4, 1828, in Bordentown, New Jersey, to Edmund Louis and Emma (née Duane) Du Barry. His paternal grandfather, Jean Baptiste Marie Du Barry, was a French citizen who owned plantations in the French colony of Saint-Domingue in the Caribbean. When the Haitian Revolution broke out in 1791, the Du Barrys fled to the United States and settled in Philadelphia. His paternal grandmother was Anne Louise Beekman, widow of Count Alexander Chodkiewicz of Poland. Beekman's father was a physician, and surgeon in the United States Navy. For a time, he served as personal physician to Joseph Bonaparte, the ex-king of Naples and Sicily and ex-king of Spain, and caretaker of Bonaparter's estate, Point Breeze, at Bordentown. His maternal grandfather was William J. Duane, a journalist and powerful politician in the state of Pennsylvania who served as Secretary of the Treasury under President Andrew Jackson.

Du Barry initially wanted to pursue a career in medicine, and at the age of 16 was admitted to medical school. But for reasons which are unclear, Du Barry sought and won appointment to the United States Military Academy at West Point, New York. He was admitted as an at-large appointment from Washington, D.C. Du Barry entered the military academy on July 1, 1845, and graduated on July 1, 1849, seventh in his class.

== Early military career ==
=== Florida and West Point ===
Upon graduation from West Point, Du Barry was commissioned a brevet 2nd Lieutenant in the United States Army, and assigned to Company I, 1st Artillery Regiment. Most of the regiment was serving as coastal defense from New York City to Fort Washington, Maryland. But after some of the 150 or so remaining Seminole Indians in Florida attacked settlers in July 1849, the unit was sent in August to the interior of the state to preserve order. The official United States Army history of the unit said the service consisted "of fruitless marches and countermarches, scouts in this direction and in that, and in years of service scarcely an event worthy of record". On October 7, 1849, he was reassigned to Company B.

On February 13, 1850, Du Barry was appointed a full 2nd Lieutenant and assigned to the 3rd Artillery Regiment. He reported to the regimental headquarters at Palatka, Florida, where he joined Company E (although another source says Company F).

In August, his company was assigned to West Point, where Du Barry was appointed an assistant professor of geography, history, and ethics. He served there until April 29, 1853.

=== Stevens survey ===
On February 10, 1853, outgoing President Millard Fillmore signed legislation creating the Washington Territory. On March 17, newly inaugurated President Franklin Pierce appointed Isaac Stevens the first Territorial Governor of Washington Territory. Congress had already appropriated $150,000 ($5,805,000 in 2025 dollars) to survey railroad routes across the Pacific Northwest. Secretary of War Jefferson Davis was eager to complete the surveys, and on March 25, 1853, appointed Stevens to lead the survey project. The Stevens survey was the first transcontinental survey of the western United States since the Lewis and Clark Expedition of 1804–1806, and considered very important by the United States government. Stevens largely had his pick of men for the survey project, and appointed Captain John W.T. Gardiner of the 1st Dragoons (cavalry) was appointed the chief officer of the group. Du Barry was one of five other Army officers chosen to participate in the survey.

Du Barry reported to St. Louis, Missouri, where Stevens was gathering his personnel. He was ordered on April 26 to travel upriver to St. Paul, a small town on the Mississippi River in the Minnesota Territory. He was told hire four men, and to push northwest from St. Paul across the territory to the frontier settlement of Pembina where he would meet with scouts sent by the Hudson's Bay Company. Du Barry duly arrived in St. Paul. Stevens arrived there on May 27, before Du Barry left for Pembina. Worried that the survey party would be delayed in Pembina waiting for the scouts, Stevens countermanded Du Barry's orders and had him join the main body of the survey party at St. Paul. Du Barry was assigned to take meteorological observations.

The Stevens party left St. Paul on June 6, 1853, and traveled along the Mississippi River northwest to Sauk Rapids. The group was split into three bodies: An advance mapping party, the main party, and the quartermaster and commissary train. Du Barry was given command of the main body. The advance and Du Barry parties reached the Sauk River on June 10, and the survey group reorganized. On June 14, Du Barry was placed in command of the scientific team and the quartermaster train, and ordered to take biological and botanical samples, and generally observe the natural history of the area, as the groups progressed westward. Stevens followed with the remainder of the group. Able to move much faster, Stevens overtook the Du Barry teams on June 16.

On June 18, Stevens sent a messenger back to Du Barry's teams, asking that two wagons be brought forward. Late on the evening of June 19, the messenger returned. Du Barry had misconstrued Stevens' orders, and refused to send the two wagons forward. The lack of wagons meant that the Stevens party could not push forward. A furious Stevens rode back to meet Du Barry on June 20. The two men exchanged heated words, and Du Barry asked to be relieved and sent back to West Point. Stevens granted his request. Du Barry asked permission to report to Secretary of War Davis and report on the mission thus far, another request which Stevens also granted.

Du Barry reported at West Point on July 25, 1853, which ended his service with the Stevens survey party.

=== West Point and the frontier ===
On August 29, 1853, Du Barry was again appointed to a professorship at West Point, this time as an assistant professor of French. He was promoted to 1st Lieutenant on December 23, 1853.

On May 3, 1854, he was reassigned to active duty again, this time to a company (Note: Which company is unclear. The military history of the 3rd Artillery says Company A was stationed at Fort Yuma, which implies Du Barry was assigned to that company. Official orders of the War Department also note that Du Barry was still with Company A in May 1861. Historian Freeman Cleaves says Captain George Henry Thomas was in command of Company A.) of the 3rd Artillery Regiment. He traveled via steamship to Panama, where he crossed the Isthmus by land and boarded a second steamship for San Diego, California. Initially, Company A marched overland to the settlement of Salt Lake in Utah Territory. After spending the winter there, it marched to Benicia, California, reaching the former state capitol on July 25, 1855. Company A was then assigned to Fort Yuma in the New Mexico Territory. While at Fort Yuma, Du Barry also served as post commissary, and acting assistant quartermaster. He also designed and helped construct most of the buildings and defensive works of the fort in the latter half of 1855, most of which are still standing and are now historic. Du Barry also made extensive survey of the plant and animal life around Fort Yuma. He collected an important specimen of Nama jamaicense, a flowering herb, which he sent to the Smithsonian Institution. An important, adult specimen of the desert daisy Trichoptilium incisum was also collected by Lt. Du Barry. Only immature specimens had been examined to this point, and Du Barry's fully grown sample led to a more correct classification of the plant.

Du Barry remained at Fort Yuma until July 3, 1856. He was assigned to Light Battery E, 3rd Artillery, and ordered to report to Fort Snelling in the Minnesota Territory. (Note: Du Barry camped overnight at Fort Snelling in 1853 while with the Stevens party, on their way to Sauk Rapids.) He traveled overland, and reported to Captain Thomas W. Sherman, commander of 3rd Artillery and the fort. In March 1857, the renegade Santee (also known as the Eastern Dakota or Eastern Sioux) leader Inkpaduta led his people in a raid into the state of Iowa, known as the Spirit Lake Massacre, where they killed 32 white settlers. Escaping into Minnesota, the Santee band killed a few white settlers near Springfield, Minnesota. Du Barry participated in an August 1857 expedition in the Yellow Medicine River area against the Santee. During the campaign, Company E agreed to hold a peace council with several hostile bands of Native Americans. The Indians were asked to camp at least 200 yards (180 m) away from the Army camp, and arrive at the meeting disarmed. At one point, several Indians, their firearms hidden under blankets they wore, attempted to infiltrate the meeting and massacre the Army soldiers. 2nd Lt. William T. Spencer spotted them and roused the troops. Spencer's quick action discouraged the Native American warriors, who fired a few desultory shots and fled. The expedition was generally a failure, as Inkpaduta's Santee were never captured.

On August 13, 1857, Du Barry's unit was transferred to Fort Leavenworth in the Kansas Territory. The Kansas–Nebraska Act of 1854 had called for elections to decide if the territories of Kansas and Nebraska were to allow or ban slavery. In Kansas Territory, the anti-slavery Free-Staters and pro-slavery Border Ruffians engaged in a long-running guerrilla war against one another in a series of incidents generally known as Bleeding Kansas. The 3rd Artillery replaced the 2nd Dragoons, a cavalry unit sent to Utah to participate in the Utah War. Pro-slavery elements drafted the so-called "Lecompton Constitution" on November 7, 1857, and voters were asked whether they wanted to accept it "with slavery" (with slavery and slave buying, selling, and importation legal) or "without slavery" (the right to hold existing slaves protected, but importation barred). Anti-slavery elements boycotted the December 21 election, and the constitution was adopted 6,226 to 569. (Note: By most estimates, 2,720 of the pro-slavery votes were illegal, cast by Border Ruffians from nearby Missouri.) Violence escalated statewide, and a second vote held on January 4, 1858. Boycotted by pro-slavery elements, the Lecompton Constitution was rejected by a vote of 10,226 to 162. Once more, violence surrounded the election and its aftermath. During the winter of 1857–1858, Du Barry led a team which mapped the Missouri River from Fort Leavenworth to the mouth of the Platte River, to locate a site for an Army depot. Congress rejected Kansas' application for statehood, and offered voters a third option: Accept the Lecompton Constitution, and Congress would give the new state extensive grants of land for schools, roads, and public buildings, or reject it and be penalized by not only not obtaining the land grants but also not being able to apply for statehood until Kansas Territory had at least 93,500 residents. On August 2, 1858, in a relatively calm and violence-free election, voters rejected the compromise by 11,300 to 1,788. The 3d Artillery assisted Territorial Governors Robert J. Walker and James W. Denver in keeping order throughout this process.

The 3rd Artillery was sent to Fort Ridgely in southwestern Minnesota on September 1, 1858. Tensions between whites and Native Americans in the region were tense, as Minnesota's statehood (granted on May 11, 1858) led to white settlement of Indian lands. Although this would lead to the Dakota War of 1862, Du Barry's time at Fort Ridgely was quiet. He received his first lengthy leave on May 18, 1859, and did not return to duty until August 31, when he was again appointed to an assistant professorship at West Point, where he taught French.

== Civil War service ==
The American Civil War broke out on April 12, 1861, when the Confederate States Army fired on Fort Sumter, South Carolina, beginning the Battle of Fort Sumter.

On May 11, 1861, Du Barry was promoted to captain and was transferred from the artillery to the commissary of subsistence. (Note: At the start of the Civil War, supplies for the U.S. Army were procured and distributed in a variety of ways. The Commissary of Subsistence procured food. The Commissary of Ordnance was in charge of purchasing ammunition, while the Quartermaster Corps supplied weapons such as knives, bayonets, guns, swords, and artillery, as well as all items necessary to maintain the army at garrison or in the field, such as uniforms, tents, animals, and most other supplies. The Commissary of Subsistence and the Commissary of Ordnance contracted in bulk for supplies, which were then stored at depots around the country. The Quartermaster Corps was responsible for requisitioning supplies from these bulk depots, and distributing them to the army in the field. The Quartermaster Corps also stored weapons at armories across the country, and distributed them to individual soldiers at training camps and in the field.) He resigned his regimental commission on May 14, and reported to his first assignment at the Commissary of Subsistence depot at Harrisburg, Pennsylvania, on May 17. The rapid expansion of the army, Commissary of Subsistence, and Quartermaster Corps as well as the sudden and high demand for supplies created chaos within the Commissary of Subsistence and Quartermaster Corps. Subsequently, Du Barry acted as both Commissary of Subsistence and Quartermaster for the Harrisburg depot. One of his most important tasks was to purchase supplies for Major General Robert Patterson's Army of the Shenandoah, then attempting to secure the northern end of the Shenandoah Valley and protect the capitol at Washington, D.C. In addition to purchase, Du Barry also organized wagon trains to take these supplies to Patterson's army on the front line. Harrisburg was also a major training camp for new Union Army recruits, and Du Barry had to forward these recruits by train to the various Union Army commands throughout the Union and Confederacy.

=== With Grant ===
Du Barry's reputation for efficiency drew the attention of Ulysses S. Grant, himself a former regimental quartermaster and only recently appointed a brigadier general. (Note: Grant was appointed a brigadier general on August 7, 1861, although his appointment was back-dated to May 17, 1861.) Grant was assigned command of the District of Southeast Missouri (an area that also included all of Missouri south of St. Louis as well as southern Illinois) on September 1, 1861. Grant commanded the Expeditionary Command, District of Southeast Missouri, which consisted of five infantry brigades, five companies of cavalry, and three batteries of artillery. By early December, however, Grant was organizing a much larger force to seize Confederate forts guarding the Tennessee River. Some time in early December, Du Barry traveled to Grant's headquarters at Cairo, Illinois. He favorably impressed Grant during this meeting, and on December 16, 1861, was appointed Chief of Commissary for forces in the field for the District of Cairo, which included western Kentucky, western Tennessee, and northern Mississippi. (Note: The District of Cairo was not formally organized until December 20, 1861.)

As Grant conquered more of the Confederacy, he brought Du Barry and his expertise with him. Grant was given command of the Army of the Tennessee on February 14, 1862. Grant had nearly lost the Battle of Shiloh (April 6–7, 1862) after a surprise attack by Confederate forces, and Major General Henry Halleck relieved of him of command. Assigned to be Halleck's deputy, Grant accompanied Halleck as Halleck personally commanded the Army of the Tennessee, the Army of the Ohio, and the Army of the Mississippi as they made a cautious, slow, month-long advance on the vital rail center of Corinth, Mississippi. On May 30, 1862, after the Siege of Corinth, the city fell, and Halleck restored Grant to command of the Army of the Tennessee on June 10. Most of the western portion of the United States and the Confederacy was, at that time, organized into the Department of the Mississippi and commanded by General Halleck. When Halleck was named General-in-chief of the Union Army, the Department of the Mississippi was broken up into several new departments and districts. One of these, the District of West Tennessee, was created on July 17, 1862. On July 22, 1862, Grant ordered Du Barry to Corinth, Mississippi, where he took up duties as Chief Commissary for the district. Throughout the middle and end of July and probably into early August, Du Barry inspected Commissary of Subsistence depots at Columbus, Ohio; Hickman, Kentucky; Island Number Ten in the Kentucky Bend of the Mississippi River; New Madrid, Missouri; Helena, Arkansas; Memphis, Tennessee; and Columbus, Kentucky. The District of West Tennessee became the Department of the Tennessee on October 16, 1862.

=== Cincinnati and Washington, D.C. ===
Du Barry's strong reputation for efficiency had drawn the attention of General-in-chief Halleck as well. In October 1862, Halleck ordered Du Barry to report to the Commissary of Subsistence deport at Cincinnati, Ohio. Du Barry was placed in command of the depot, and named Purchasing and Depot Commissary for the Department of the Missouri. But Grant wanted Du Barry back. On November 1, 1862, Grant asked for Du Barry to be his chief commissary, with a promotion to lieutenant colonel. But Halleck responded on November 4 that Du Barry could not be spared from his duties in Cincinnati.

Du Barry was promoted to major on February 9, 1863. He continued to serve at the Cincinnati depot until December 1864, when he was transferred to Washington, D.C., where he served as assistant to the Commissary General of Subsistence, Brigadier General Amos Beebe Eaton. Du Barry's efficiency and skill at procuring supplies at reasonable prices and distributing them in a timely fashion to troops in the field did not go unrecognized. Brevet promotions were given for a variety of reasons, including as a reward for gallantry, bravery, or service above and beyond the call of duty. On March 13, 1865, Du Barry was promoted twice—to brevet lieutenant colonel and to brevet colonel—for his meritorious service.

== Post-war service ==
The Civil War ended with the surrender of Robert E. Lee's Army of Northern Virginia on April 9, 1865.

Du Barry continued to serve as assistant to the Commissary General until November 4, 1873, when he was named Chief of Commissary for the Department of Dakota in St. Paul, Minnesota. He served in that position until August 23, 1876, when he was appointed Purchasing and Depot Commissary for the depot at Boston, Massachusetts. On May 1, 1877, he was named Purchasing and Depot Commissary for the depot at New York City, where he served until August 27, 1879. During the nationwide railroad strikes of 1877 that began in July 1877, many state governors attempted to break the strike by calling out state militia. But state militia failed to break the strikes, and in some cases even fraternized with the strikers. Deeply alarmed, President Rutherford B. Hayes ordered U.S. Army troops to break the strike, which ended on September 4. The Army relied heavily on Du Barry, who leapt into action to ensure that federal troops were provided with food during the strike suppression effort. Major General Winfield Scott Hancock singled Du Barry's efforts for high praise in a letter addressed to Brigadier General Edward D. Townsend, Adjutant General of the Army.

Du Barry returned to West Point on August 27, 1879, where he was appointed Treasurer, Quartermaster, and Commissary of Subsistence for the Cadet Battalion. On October 1, 1881, he took his second lengthy leave, not returning to active duty until March 30, 1882.

When Du Barry rejoined the Army, he returned for a second term as assistant to the Commissary General of Subsistence in Washington, D.C. He was promoted to lieutenant colonel (Note: There was extensive disagreement in the U.S. Army during and after the Civil War as to whether brevet promotions/commissions were equal to or less than the rank of regular promotions/commissions. Brevet promotions often were used to promote a deserving officer into a military grade for which there was a need, or when there were too many officers to fill the limited number of positions authorized by Congress. Brevet commissions were often "converted" to regular commissions to eliminate such confusion.) on May 20, 1882, (nearly 20 years after Ulysses S. Grant first proposed his promotion) and to colonel on September 3, 1889. On July 10, 1890, Du Barry was promoted to brigadier general and appointed Commissary General of Subsistence.

Du Barry served as Commissary General of Subsistence until his retirement on December 4, 1892. He continued to live quietly at home in Washington, D.C., rarely attending social events.

== Personal life ==
Beekman Du Barry married Helen A. Bratt at West Point on May 14, 1861. She was the daughter of John Bratt, an 1837 West Point graduate who resigned from the U.S. Army to become a civilian engineer. The Du Barrys had six children, only four of whom survived into adulthood: Helen (1869–1949), Beekman Jr. (1873–1917), Estelle (1875–1950), and Elise (1879-?). Adelaid died in 1870 at the age of eight, and the first Beekman Jr. was born and died in 1872.

Helen Du Barry was at Ford's Theatre on April 14, 1865, when John Wilkes Booth assassinated President Abraham Lincoln. Her letters about the president's death, most of them written to her mother, were published by the Illinois State Historical Society in 1946.

== Death ==
Beekman Du Barry died on January 12, 1901, at his home in Washington, D.C., from cardiovascular disease caused by arteriosclerosis. Du Barry was buried at West Point Cemetery at West Point, New York, on January 16, 1901. He was survived by his wife, son, and three daughters.

== Bibliography ==
- Adams, Oscar Fay; et al., eds. (1902). "Du Barry, Beekman". Appletons' Annual Cyclopædia and Register of Important Events of the Year 1901. Third Series, Vol. VI. New York: D. Appleton & Co.
- Association of the Graduates of the United States Military Academy (June 8, 1901). The Thirty-Second Annual Reunion of the Association of the Graduates of the United States Military Academy at West Point, New York. Sagninaw, Mich.: Seeman and Peters, Printers and Binders.
- Bonekemper, Edward H. III (2004). Ulysses S. Grant: A Victor, Not a Butcher: The Military Genius of the Man Who Won the Civil War. Washington, D.C.: Regnery Publishing. ISBN 9781596986411.
- Brockett, Linus Pierpont (1865). Our Great Captains: Grant, Sherman, Thomas, Sheridan and Farragut. New York: C.B. Richardson. p. 47. "Department of West Tennessee."
- Christianson, Stephen G. (1996). Facts About the Congress. New York: Wilson. ISBN 9780824208837.
- Cleaves, Freeman (1948). Rock of Chickamauga: The Life of General George H. Thomas. Norman, Okla.: University of Oklahoma Press. ISBN 9780806119786.
- Committee on Military Affairs (September 26, 1890). William T. Spencer. Rept. No. 3197. 51st Cong., 1st sess (Report). Washington, D.C.: Government Printing Office.
- Committee on Pensions (January 7, 1902). Helen A.B. Du Barry. Sen. Rept. No. 14. United States Senate. 57th Cong., 1st sess (Report). Washington, D.C.: Government Printing Office.
- Dreilinger, Tamas (2001). "Army of the Tennessee". In Brown, Jerold E. (ed.). Historical Dictionary of the U.S. Army. Westport, Conn.: Greenwood Press. ISBN 9781429476065.
- Eicher, John H.; Eicher, David J. (2001). Civil War High Commands. Stanford, Calif.: Stanford University Press. ISBN 9780804736411.
- Etcheson, Nicole (2004). Bleeding Kansas: Contested Liberty in the Civil War Era. Lawrence, Kan.: University Press of Kansas. ISBN 9780700612871.
- Emory, William H. (1859). Report on the United States and Mexican Boundary Survey. Vol. 2, part 1. Exec. Doc. No. 108. 34th Cong., 1st sess (Report). Washington, D.C.: A.O.P. Nicholson, Printer.
- Goodrich, Thomas (1988). War to the Knife: Bleeding Kansas, 1854–1861. Lincoln, Neb.: University of Nebraska Press. ISBN 9780803271142.
- Grant, Ulysses S. (1970). Simon, John Y. (ed.). The Papers of Ulysses S. Grant. Vol. 3: October 1, 1861-January 7, 1862. Carbondale, Ill.: Southern Illinois University Press. ISBN 9780809304714.
- Grant, Ulysses S. (1977). Simon, John Y. (ed.). The Papers of Ulysses S. Grant. Vol. 5: April 1-August 31, 1862. Carbondale, Ill.: Southern Illinois University Press. ISBN 9780809306367.
- Grant, Ulysses S. (1977). Simon, John Y. (ed.). The Papers of Ulysses S. Grant. Vol. 6: September 1-December 8, 1862. Carbondale, Ill.: Southern Illinois University Press. ISBN 9780809306947.
- Hoffman, Paul E. (2002). Florida's Frontiers. Bloomington, Ind.: Indiana University Press. ISBN 9780253340191.
- Hughes, Nathaniel Cheairs (1991). The Battle of Belmont: Grant Strikes South. Chapel Hill, N.C.: University of North Carolina Press. ISBN 0807819689.
- Hunt, Herbert; Kaylor, Floyd C. (1917). Washington, West of the Cascades: Historical and Descriptive; the Explorers, the Indians, the Pioneers, the Modern. Chicago: S.J. Clarke Publishing Co. p. 234. "Stevens knew that Congress had appropriated $150,000 for the survey of."
- Johnson, Richard W. (1886). A Soldier's Reminiscences in Peace and War. Philadelphia: Lippincott.
- Johnson, Richard W. (1898). "Fort Snelling From Its Foundation to the Present Time". Collections of the Minnesota Historical Society. Volume 8. St. Paul, Minn.: Minnesota Historical Society.
- Lass, William E. (2008). "Inkpaduta (Scarlet Point)". In Hudson, David; Bergman, Marvin; Horton, Loren N. (eds.). The Biographical Dictionary of Iowa. Iowa City, Ia.: University of Iowa Press. ISBN 9781587297243.
- Lambert, Josiah Bartlett (2005). "If the workers took a notion": The Right to Strike and American Political Development. Ithaca, N.Y.: ILR Press. ISBN 9780801489457.
- Lardas, Mark; Hook, Adam (2012). Ulysses S. Grant: Leadership, Strategy, Conflict. Botley, Oxford: Osprey Publishing. ISBN 9781849087339.
- Lee, Dan (2014). The Civil War in the Jackson Purchase, 1861–1862: The Pro-Confederate Struggle and Defeat in Southwest Kentucky. Jefferson, N.C.: McFarland & Company. ISBN 9780786477821.
- MacKinnon, William P. (2008). At Sword's Point. Norman, Okla.: Arthur H. Clark Co. ISBN 9780870623530.
- Martin, David G. (2003). The Shiloh Campaign: March-April 1862. Cambridge, Mass.: Da Capo Press. ISBN 0306812592.
- Merrick, George Byron (1909). Old Times on the Upper Mississippi: Recollections of a Steamboat Pilot From 1854 to 1863. Minneapolis: University of Minnesota Press. ISBN 9780816693641.
- Michno, Gregory (2003). Encyclopedia of Indian Wars: Western Battles and Skirmishes, 1850–1890. Missoula, Mont.: Mountain Press Publishing Co. ISBN 9780878424689.
- Miller, Richard F., ed. (2015). States at War, Volume 4: A Reference Guide for Delaware, Maryland, and New Jersey in the Civil War. Lebanon, N.H.: University Press of New England. ISBN 9781611683240.
- Miner, Carrie (2006). Fun With the Family, Arizona: Hundreds of Ideas for Day Trips With the Kids. Guilford, Conn.: Globe Pequot Press. ISBN 9780762740314.
- Mitchell, Joseph B. (1972). Military Leaders in the Civil War. New York: Putnam. ISBN 9780939009138.
- Mullis, Tony R. (2004). Peacekeeping on the Plains: Army Operations in Bleeding Kansas. Columbia, Mo.: University of Missouri Press. ISBN 9780826215352.
- O'Brien, Thomas M.; Diefendorf, Oliver (1864). General Orders of the War Department: Embracing the Years 1861, 1862, and 1863. Volume 1. New York: Derby & Miller.
- Office of the Secretary of State (1984). Territorial Governors, 1853–1889. Olympia, Wash.: State of Washington.
- Phillips, Julieanne (2007). "Lecompton Constitution". In Rodriguez, Junius P. (ed.). Slavery in the United States: A Social, Political, and Historical Encyclopedia. Santa Barbara, Calif.: ABC-CLIO. ISBN 9781851095445.
- Phisterer, Frederick (1883). Statistical Record of the Armies of the United States. New York: C. Scribner's Sons. p. 42. "Department of the Tennessee created 1862."
- Risch, Erna (1995). The Quartermaster Corps: Organization, Supply, and Services. Vol. 1. United States Army in World War II. Technical services. Washington, D.C.: Center of Military History, United States Army. hdl:2027/umn.31951d01200390u.
- Rodenbough, Theophilus F.; Haskin, William L. (1896). The Army of the United States: Historical Sketches of Staff and Line With Portraits of Generals-in-Chief. New York: Maynard, Merrill.
- Sanders, Helen Fitzgerald (1913). A History of Montana. Volume 1. Chicago: Lewis Publishing Co. hdl:2027/inu.32000001543604.
- Schroeder-Lein, Glenna R. (2015). The Encyclopedia of Civil War Medicine. New York: Routledge. ISBN 9781317457107.
- Shearer, Benjamin F. (2004). The Uniting States: The Story of Statehood for the Fifty United States. Volume 1: From Alabama to Kentucky. Westport, Conn.: Greenwood Press. ISBN 9780313331053.
- Stevens, Isaac I. (1860). Reports of Explorations and Surveys to Ascertain the Most Practicable and Economical Route for a Railroad From the Mississippi River to the Pacific Ocean. Volume 12. Book I. Washington, D.C.: Thomas Ford, Printer.
- Stroud, Patricia Tyson (2005). The Man Who Had Been King: The American Exile of Napoleon's Brother Joseph. Philadelphia: University of Pennsylvania Press. ISBN 9780812290424.
- Torrey, John (1856). "Description of the General Botanical Collections". Reports of Explorations and Surveys to Ascertain the Most Practicable and Economical Route for a Railroad From the Mississippi River to the Pacific Ocean, Made Under the Direction of the Secretary of War, 1853-4, According to Act of Congress of March 3, 1853, May 31, 1854, and August 5, 1854. Volume 4. Exec. Doc. No. 78. 33rd Cong., 2nd sess (Report). Washington, D.C.: Beverley Tucker, Printer.
- Welker, David A. (2007). Tempest At Ox Hill: The Battle of Chantilly. Cambridge, Mass.: Da Capo Press. ISBN 9780306817205.
- Williams & Co. (June 1863). Williams' Cincinnati Directory. Cincinnati, Ohio: Williams & Co.
