= Attorney General Barry =

Attorney General Barry may refer to:

- Redmond Barry (lord chancellor) (1866–1913), Attorney-General for Ireland
- Charles Robert Barry (1825–1897), Attorney-General for Ireland
