= Battle of Belmont order of battle: Confederate =

The following Confederate Army units and commanders fought in the Battle of Belmont of the American Civil War. The Union order of battle is listed separately.

== Abbreviations used ==
=== Military Rank ===
- BG = Brigadier General
- Col = Colonel
- Ltc= Lieutenant Colonel
- Maj = Major
- Cpt= Captain
- Lt = 1st Lieutenant

== Confederate Forces ==
=== First Division, Western Department ===
MG Leonidas Polk

Brigade	Regiments and Other
Camp of Observation, Belmont Col James Camp Tappan	13th Arkansas: Col James C. Tappan; 1st Mississippi Cavalry Battalion: Ltc John H. Miller; Watson Battery: Ltc Daniel Beltzhoover
Reinforcements brought by BG Pillow BG Gideon Johnson Pillow	12th Tennessee: Col Robert M. Russell, Ltc Tyree H. Bell; 13th Tennessee: Col John Vines Wright, Ltc Alfred Jefferson Vaughan, Jr.; 21st Tennessee: Col Edward Pickett, Jr.; 22nd Tennessee: Col Thomas J. Freeman
Units dispatched to BG Pillow	11th Louisiana: Col Samuel F. Marks, Ltc Robert H. Barrow; 1st Mississippi Battalion: Ltc Andrew K. Blythe; 2nd Tennessee: Col J. Knox Walker, Ltc William B. Ross; 15th Tennessee: Col Charles M. Carroll, Ltc Robert C. Tyler; 154th Senior Tennessee: Col Preston Smith, Ltc Marcus Joseph Wright
Cavalry	Logwood's Tennessee Battalion: Ltc Thomas H. Logwood
Steamers	Charm: Captain William L. Trask; Harry W. R. Hill: Captain Tom H. Newel; Ingomar: Captain Joe D. Clark; Kentucky: Captain Billy Priest; Prince: Captain B. J. Butler
Artillery [fired from Kentucky shore]	Bankhead's Tennessee Battery: Cpt Smith P. Bankhead; Hamilton's Tennessee Battery: Cpt S. D. H. Hamilton; Jackson's Light Battery: Lt William W. Carnes; Pointe Coupee Battery: Cpt Richard A. Stewart; Smith's Mississippi Light Battery: Cpt Melancthon Smith; Stewart's Heavy Battery: Maj Alexander P. Stewart

=== Units in reserve or near Columbus ===
Units	Regiments and Others
Infantry	10th Arkansas: Col Thomas D. Merrick; 12th Arkansas: Col E. W. Gantt; 7th Kentucky: Col Charles Wickliffe; 12th Louisiana: Col Thomas M. Scott; 21st Louisiana Battalion (5th Louisiana Battalion): Ltc J. B. Kennedy; 22nd Mississippi: Col D.W.C. Bonham; 25th Mississippi: Col. J.D. Martin; 1st Missouri: Col Lucius L. Rich; 4th Tennessee: Col Rufus P. Neely; 5th Tennessee: Col William E. Travis; 6th Tennessee: Col William H. Stephens; 9th Tennessee: Col Henry L. Douglass; 33rd Tennessee: Col Alexander W. Campbell
Artillery	Hudson's Mississippi Battery: Cpt Clement L. Hudson; Polk's Light Battery: Cpt Marshall T. Polk; Williams' Tennessee Battery: Lt Thomas F. Tobin

== See also ==
- Missouri in the American Civil War
- Kentucky in the American Civil War
