= 17th Illinois Infantry Regiment =

17th Regiment Illinois Volunteer Infantry
- Illinois state flag
- Active: May 24, 1861, to June 4, 1864
- Country: United States
- Allegiance: Union
- Branch: Infantry
- Engagements: Battle of Fredericktown; Fort Donelson; Battle of Shiloh; Battle of Thompson's Station; Battle of Port Gibson; Battle of Raymond; Battle of Champion's Hill; Battle of Big Black River; Siege of Vicksburg

The 17th Regiment Illinois Volunteer Infantry was an infantry regiment that served in the Union Army during the American Civil War.

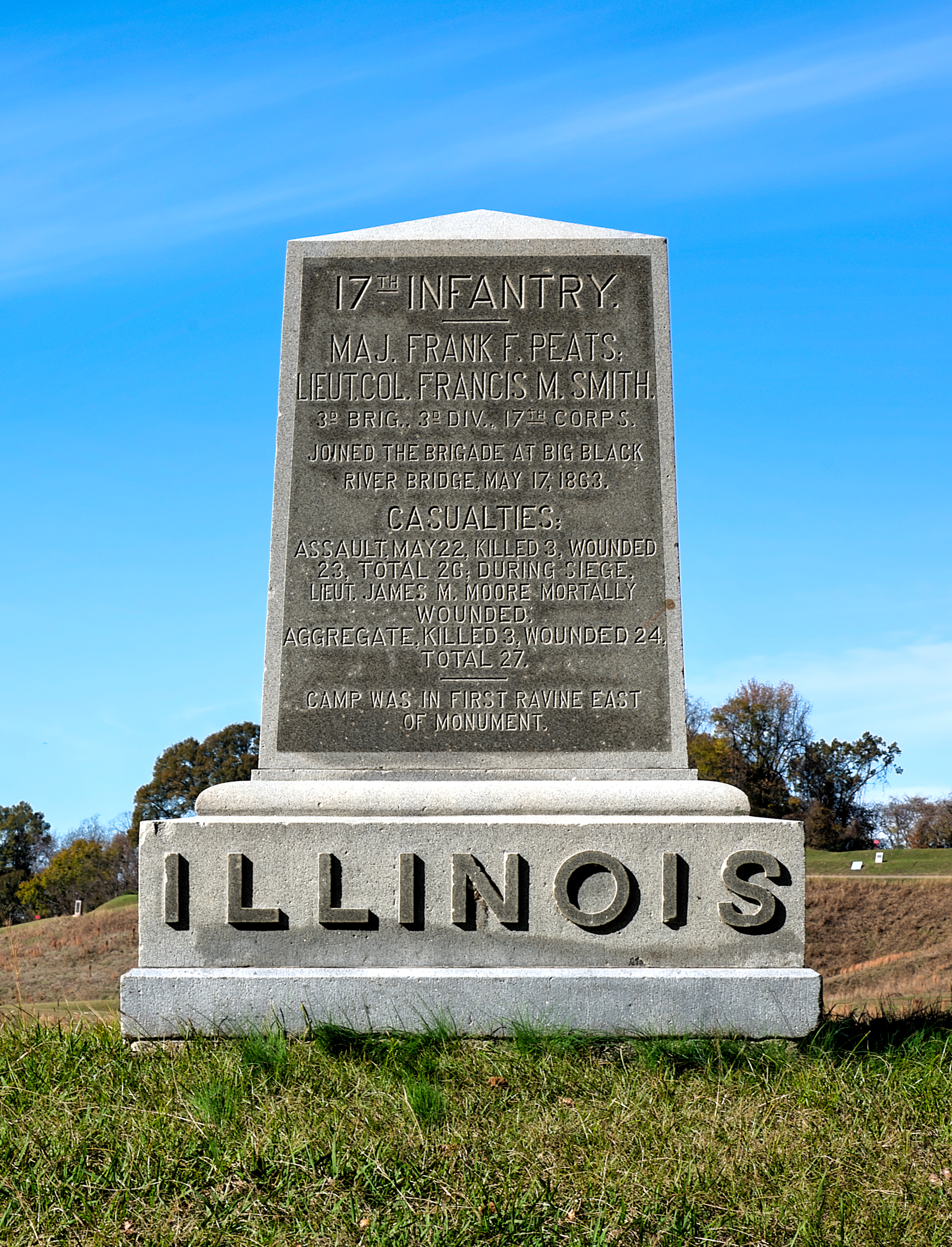
Memorial at Vicksburg National Military Park

== Service ==
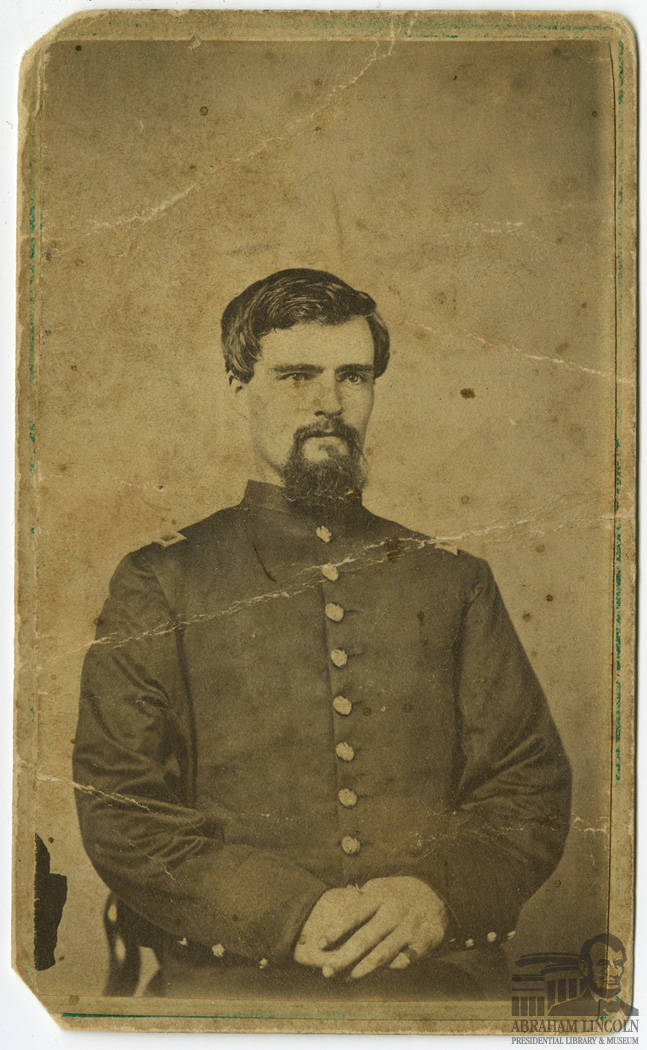
John A. Griffin of Cambridge, Illinois, who served in Company D of the 17th Illinois, photographed by Alexander Hesler

The 17th Illinois Infantry was organized at Peoria, Illinois, and mustered into Federal service at Peoria, Illinois, on May 24, 1861, for three years service.

The 17th Illinois Volunteers fought at the bloody Battle of Shiloh in Hardin County, Tennessee, in April 1862, with 130 members of the regiment killed and wounded in the two-day battle. This unit also participated in the last phase of the 1863 Siege of Vicksburg in Warren County, Mississippi, a protracted battle which ultimately led to the surrender of over 29,000 Confederate troops.

The regiment was mustered out of service on June 4, 1864, upon expiration of its term of enlistment and its recruits and veterans were transferred to the 8th Illinois.

== Total strength and casualties ==
The regiment suffered 3 officers and 71 enlisted men who were killed in action or who died of their wounds and 1 officer and 71 enlisted men who died of disease, for a total of 146 fatalities.

== Commanders ==
- Colonel Leonard Fulton Ross - promoted to brigadier general on April 25, 1862.
- Colonel Addison S. Norton - resigned July 9, 1863.
- Lieutenant Colonel Enos P. Wood - commanded regiment then brigade at Shiloh, resigned 19 April 1862
- Lieutenant Colonel Francis Smith -

== Notable Members ==
- James Earp

== See also ==
- List of Illinois Civil War Units
- Illinois in the American Civil War
