= 20th Illinois Infantry Regiment =

20th Regiment Illinois Volunteer Infantry
- Illinois state flag
- Active: June 13, 1861, to July 16, 1865
- Country: United States
- Allegiance: Union
- Branch: Infantry
- Engagements: Fort Henry; Battle of Shiloh; Battle of Port Gibson; Battle of Champion Hill; Battle of Big Black River; Siege of Vicksburg; Battle of Kennesaw Mountain; Battle of Atlanta; Battle of Jonesboro; March to the Sea; Battle of Bentonville

The 20th Regiment Illinois Volunteer Infantry was an infantry regiment that served in the Union Army during the American Civil War.

== Service ==
The 20th Illinois Infantry was organized at Joliet, Illinois, and mustered into Federal service on June 13, 1861, for a three-year enlistment.

The regiment spent its first months of service in Missouri, establishing a base near Cape Girardeau. On October 20, 1861, the regiment saw its first engagement at Fredericktown, where it was actively engaging the Confederate forces there.

=== Battles in Tennessee ===
In February 1862, the regiment was assigned to Wallace's Brigade of McClernand's Division. They took part in the Battle of Fort Henry and later, the Battle of Fort Donelson. Following the Confederate surrender, the regiment moved to Pittsburg Landing.

On April 6–7, 1862, the 20th Illinois Fought in the Battle of Shiloh, yet again under McClernand's Division. After the Battle, it took part in the Siege of Corinth. The regiment spent the summer of 1862 conducting garrison duty in Jackson, Tennessee, and guarding the Mobile and Ohio Railroad. On September 1, 1862, the regiment fought in the Battle of Britton's Lane, Relieving Union troops at Medon Station.

=== Vicksburg Campaign ===
In early 1863, the regiment took part in the Vicksburg Campaign, where it was attached to the First Brigade, Logan's Division, XVII Corps. They participated in a series of battles that isolated the city, which were Port Gibson, Raymond, Champion Hill, and Big Black River Bridge.

During the Siege of Vicksburg, the 20th Illinois occupied a position on the Jackson Road and participated in major assaults on May 19, 22, and June 25. The regiment entered the city upon its surrender on July 4, 1863.

In early 1864, a majority of the regiment were re-enlisted as veterans and returned to Illinois for a 30-day furlough. By June 1864, they joined Sherman's Army for the Atlanta Campaign.

The regiment was heavily engaged at Kennesaw Mountain and Atlanta. During the fierce fighting, the regiment was positioned on the extreme left flank of the army; during the Confederate assault, many members of the regiment were surrounded and captured.

=== March to the Sea and the Carolinas Campaign ===
After the fall of Atlanta, the 20th Illinois joined Sherman's March to the Sea, entering Savannah on Christmas Day, 1864. In January 1865, they joined in the Carolinas Campaign, participating in the Battle of Bentonville.

Following the Surrender of Joseph E. Johnston's Army at Raleigh, the regiment marched north to Washington, D.C., Where it took part in the Grand Review of the Armies on May 24, 1865.

The Regiment moved to Louisville Kentucky, where it was mustered out of Service on July 16, 1865.

The regiment was mustered out of service on July 16, 1865.

== Total strength and casualties ==
The regiment suffered 7 officers and 132 enlisted men who were killed in action or who died of their wounds, and 1 officer and 191 enlisted men who died of disease, for a total of 331 fatalities.

== Commanders ==
- Colonel C. Carroll Marsh -resigned on April 22, 1863.
- Colonel Daniel Bradley - discharged February 13, 1865.
- Lieutenant Colonel Henry King - mustered out with the regiment.

== See also ==
- List of Illinois Civil War Units
- Illinois in the American Civil War
