= Glenda Kelly =

Missouri politician

- Born: 3 June 1944 (age 82); San Diego, California, U.S.
- Occupation: Politician

Glenda Kelly (born June 3, 1944) is a former American Democratic politician who served in the Missouri House of Representatives and as mayor of St. Joseph, Missouri from 1991 until 1994.

Born in San Diego, California, she graduated from the Missouri Western State College. She previously worked as a legal secretary.
