= Old Town (Mississippi) =

Old Town was a Chickasaw village in northeast Mississippi in present-day Lee County.

Old Town was located at 34°18′10″N 88°43′30″W.

== See also ==
- Town Creek
- Chickasaw Campaign of 1736
