= Engagement at Fredericktown =

Battle of the American Civil War

- Part of the Trans-Mississippi Theater of the American Civil War
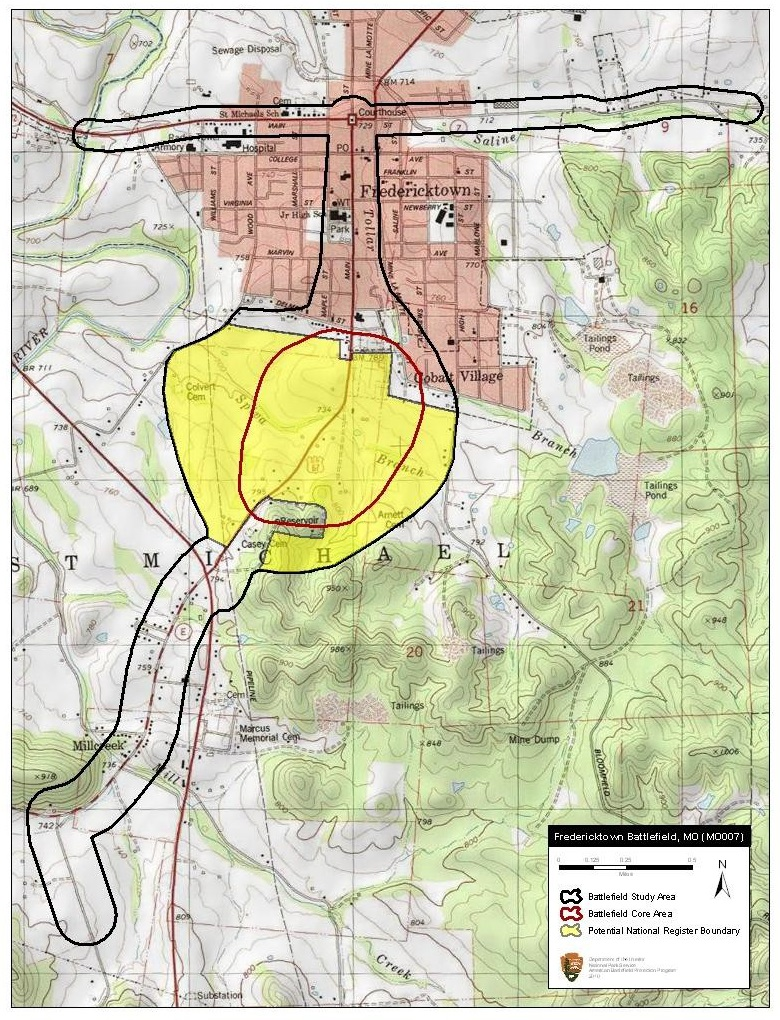
- Fredericktown Battlefield
Date	October 21, 1861
Location	Near Fredericktown, Missouri 37°32′36.24″N 90°17′48.84″W
Result	Union victory

Belligerents
United States (Union)	Missouri (Confederate)

Commanders and leaders
Joseph B. Plummer; William P. Carlin	M. Jeff Thompson

Units involved
11th Missouri Infantry	Missouri State Guard

Strength
2,500–3,500	1,500

Casualties and losses
67	145 total 25 killed 40 wounded 80 captured
- Location within Missouri

Engagement at Fredericktown, also known as the Battle of Fredericktown, was a battle of the American Civil War that took place on October 21, 1861, in Madison County, Missouri. The Union victory consolidated control of southeastern Missouri.

== Background ==
In October 1861, Missouri State Guard Brigadier-General M. Jeff Thompson led a 1500-man force into southeastern Missouri. On October 15, he burned the Iron Mountain Railroad bridge over the Big River in Jefferson County, capturing many of the bridge guards. Two Union columns, one under Col. Joseph B. Plummer with 1,500 men and another under Col. William P. Carlin with 3,000 men, were sent in pursuit. By October 20, Thompson had learned of the Union pursuit and withdrew south of Fredericktown. That evening, however, he decided to attack the Federal advance with his infantrymen.

== Battle ==
Thompson spent the early morning hours trying to determine the enemy's numbers and disposition. Unable to do so, he placed his troops and artillery in ambush along the road and awaited the Union forces. The bulk of the Missouri State Guard force was hidden from view on wooded high ground that formed a U overlooking the road. Forward of the main body, Col. Aden Lowe's infantry regiment waited in a cornfield as bait. Close behind was a supporting 12-pounder cannon as well as three 6-pounders farther to the rear and flank.

About noon Plummer arrived with his column and a detachment of Col. William P. Carlin's troops. Capt. Stewart's Illinois cavalry company made the initial contact. Col. Ross's 17th Illinois Infantry engaged Lowe's troops first with skirmishers, then the main line of the regiment. A section of Union artillery was brought into service against the Missourians' 12-pounder, which responded. The 20th Illinois and 11th Missouri applied pressure to both flanks of Lowe's force as more Union artillery joined the battle. Lowe, having waited too long to disengage, was killed by a shot to the head, and his regiment retreated taking heavy casualties.

The 1st Indiana Cavalry attempted to pursue and to capture the exposed 12-pounder, but were stopped with heavy casualties by the fire of Thompson's forces on both ridges. They called for infantry support and the 17th Illinois surged forward to claim the now abandoned piece. As more Union infantry poured onto the field, Thompson began an orderly withdrawal of the guardsmen. In this he mostly succeeded, except for some routing cavalry.

== Casualties ==
Thompson's Missouri State Guardsmen suffered a total of 145 casualties during the battle, including 25 dead, 40 wounded, and 80 captured. They also lost one artillery piece, an old iron 12-pounder. Union casualties were reported as 7 killed and about 60 wounded. There were a number of other casualties (primarily Union) in skirmishes before and after the battle.

== Aftermath ==
Some of the Union soldiers believed that locals had assisted Thompson in the engagement. They were also angered by perceived mistreatment of Unionist citizens along the line of march. This resentment led to retaliation against the town by the rank and file. At least seven homes in Fredericktown were burned and other buildings damaged before the officers regained control of their men.
