= M. Jeff Thompson =

American politician and Confederate general of the Civil War (1826-1876)

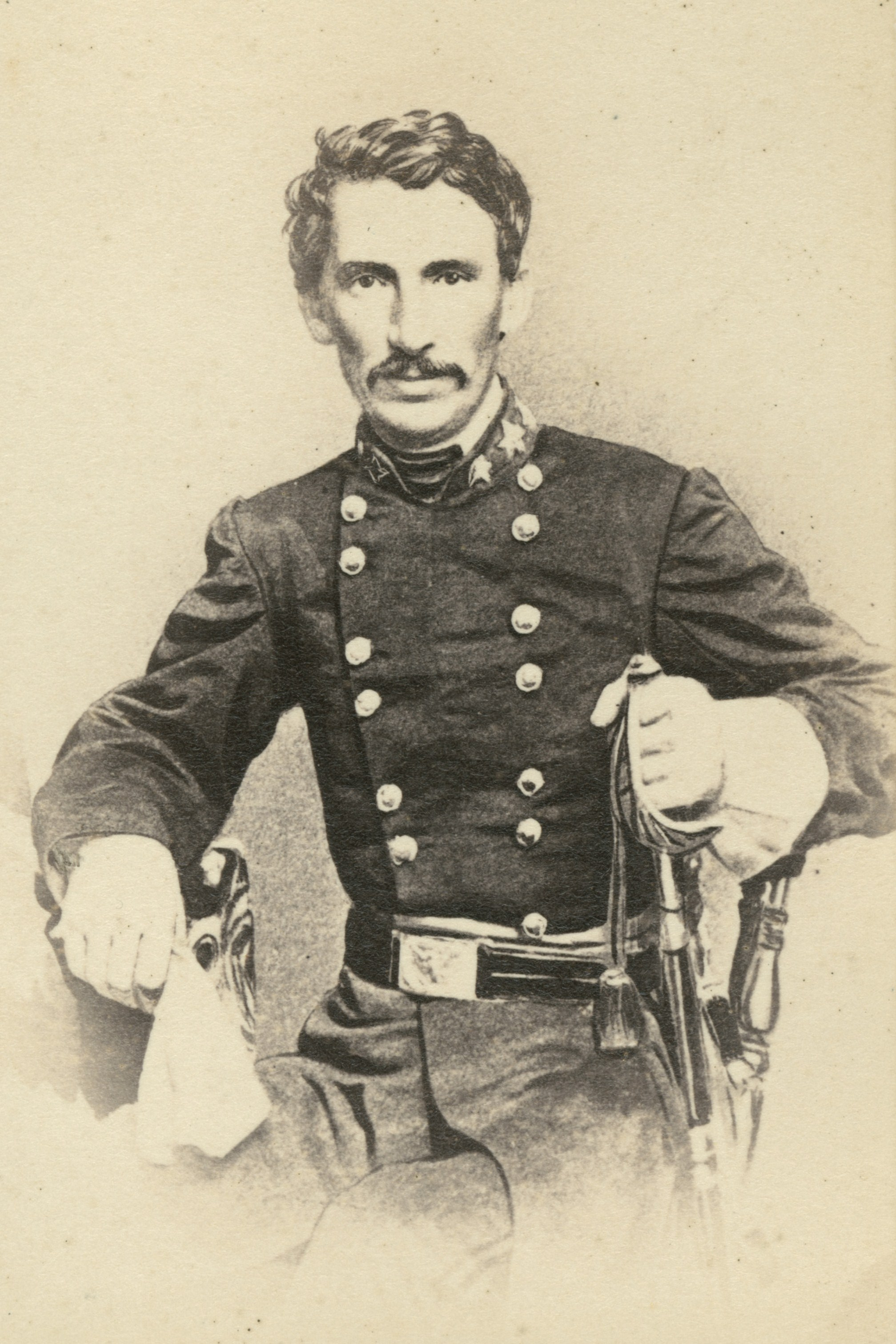
- Thompson in uniform, c. 1862
- Born: Meriwether Jefferson Thompson; January 22, 1826; Jefferson County, Virginia (present-day West Virginia), U.S.
- Died: September 5, 1876 (aged 50); St. Joseph, Missouri, U.S.
- Burial place: Mount Mora Cemetery, St. Joseph, Missouri, U.S. 39°46′33.0″N 94°50′30.9″W
- Spouse: Emma Catherine Hayes (m. 1848)
- Military career
- Allegiance: Confederate States
- Branch: Missouri State Guard
- Service years: 1861–1865 (Mo.)
- Rank: Brigadier-General (Mo.)
- Nickname: "Swamp Fox"
- Commands: Missouri State Guard; Missouri Cavalry Brigade; Northern Sub-District of Arkansas
- Battles: American Civil War; Battle of Fredericktown; Battle of Plum Point Bend; Capture of Sedalia; Battle of Westport; Battle of Mine Creek; Battle of Newtonia

7th Mayor of St. Joseph, Missouri
- In office 1857–1860
- Preceded by: John Corby
- Succeeded by: Armstrong Beattie

Brigadier-General Meriweather Jeff Thompson (January 22, 1826 – September 5, 1876), nicknamed "Swamp Fox," was an American soldier who was a senior officer of the Missouri State Guard who commanded cavalry in the Trans-Mississippi Theater of the American Civil War. The CSS General M. Jeff Thompson (c. 1862) was named after him.

== Early life and career ==
Meriwether Jefferson Thompson was born in Jefferson County, Virginia (present-day West Virginia), into a family with a strong military tradition on both sides. He received basic training in military tactics in Charleston, South Carolina, but was not appointed to a military academy. Following his education, he found employment as a store clerk in a few Virginia and Pennsylvania towns. He moved to Liberty, Missouri, in 1847 and St. Joseph the following year, beginning as a store clerk before taking up surveying and serving as the city engineer. He later supervised the construction of the western branch of the Hannibal & St. Joseph Railroad. He married Emma Catherine Hays in 1848. He served as the seventh Mayor of St. Joseph, Missouri from 1857 to 1860. He presided over the ceremony inaugurating the first ride of the Pony Express on April 3, 1860. He gained national attention in May 1861, when he cut down a United States flag from the St. Joseph Post Office flag pole and threw it down to an angry crowd of southern sympathizers who shredded it to pieces.

== American Civil War ==
Thompson was a lieutenant-colonel in the Missouri state militia at the outbreak of the Civil War. On July 25, 1861, he was appointed brigadier-general of the 1st Division, Missouri State Guard. He commanded the First Military District of Missouri, which covered the swampy southeastern quarter of the state from St. Louis to the Mississippi River. Thompson's battalion soon became known as the "Swamp Rats" for their exploits. He gained renown as the "Swamp Fox of the Confederacy." Although Thompson frequently petitioned for the Confederate rank of brigadier-general it was never granted. His brigadier rank came from his Missouri State Guard service.

When Union Major-General John C. Fremont issued his namesake Proclamation, placing Missouri under Martial Law and threatening to execute prisoners of war, Thompson declared a counter-proclamation threatening to do the same. Lincoln would step in and recede the proclamation, stopping the bloodshed from breaking out. Thompson's force of 3,000 soldiers began raiding Union positions near the border in October. On October 15, 1861, Thompson led a cavalry attack on the Iron Mountain Railroad bridge over the Big River near Blackwell in Jefferson County. After successfully burning the bridge, Thompson retreated to join his infantry in Fredericktown. Soon afterwards, he was defeated at the Battle of Fredericktown and withdrew, leaving southeastern Missouri in Union control.

After briefly commanding rams in the Confederate riverine fleet in 1862, Thompson was reassigned to the Trans-Mississippi region. There, he engaged in a number of battles before returning to Arkansas in 1863 to accompany Gen. John S. Marmaduke on his raid into Missouri. Thompson was captured in August in Arkansas, and spent time in St. Louis' Gratiot Military Prison, as well as Alton Military Prison, in Alton, Illinois. In addition to Fort Delaware and Johnson's Island prisoner-of-war camps ("Poor old Jeff, how my heart went out to him; he a prisoner and his devoted wife in a madhouse", Major Lamar Fontaine wrote later).

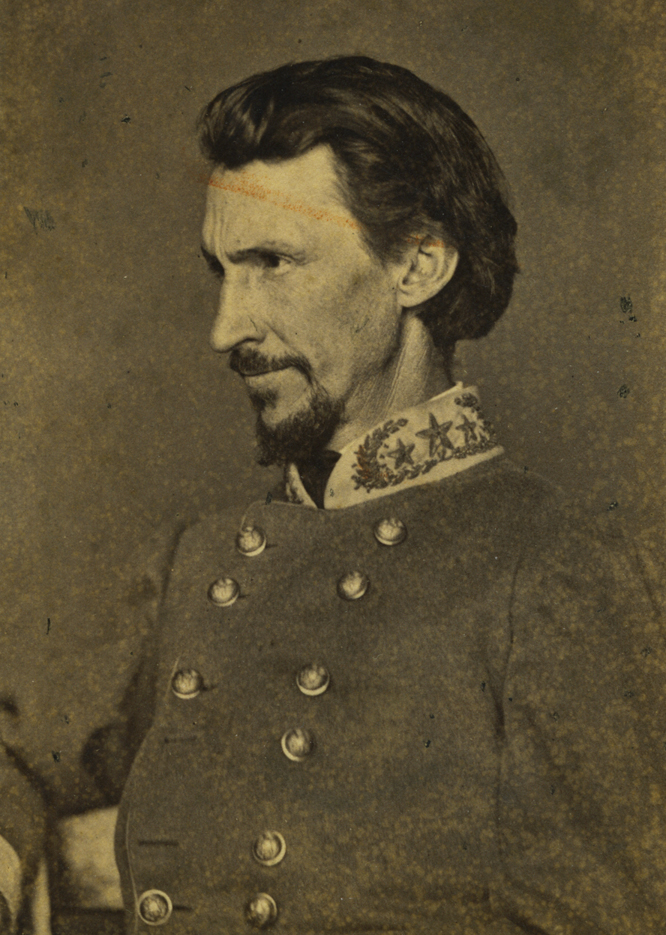
Thompson as a POW c. 1864

Eventually, he was exchanged in 1864 for a Union general. Later that year, Thompson participated in Major-General Sterling Price's Missouri expedition, taking command of "Jo" Shelby's famed "Iron Brigade" when Shelby became division commander. He served competently in this role.

In March 1865, Thompson was appointed commander of the Northern Sub-District of Arkansas. He agreed to surrender his command at Chalk Bluff, Arkansas on May 11, 1865.

== Later life ==
After the American Civil War, Thompson moved to New Orleans, where he returned to civil engineering. He designed a program for improving the Louisiana swamps, a job that eventually destroyed his health. He returned to St. Joseph, Missouri in 1876 where he succumbed to tuberculosis. He is buried in Mount Mora Cemetery in St. Joseph, Missouri.

== Honors ==
In early 1862 at New Orleans, a side-wheel river steamer was converted to a "Cottonclad" ram and named after Thompson. The CSS General M. Jeff. Thompson was sent up the Mississippi that April to join the River Defense Fleet in Tennessee waters, seeing its first action at Plum Point Bend. On June the 6th, after being set afire by gunfire at Memphis, the General M. Jeff. Thompson ran aground and soon blew up.

== See also ==
- List of acting Confederate generals
- List of people from West Virginia

== Sources ==
- Allardice, Bruce S. More Generals in Gray. Baton Rouge: Louisiana State University Press, 1995. ISBN 978-0-8071-3148-0.
- Eicher, John H., and David J. Eicher, Civil War High Commands. Stanford: Stanford University Press, 2001. ISBN 978-0-8047-3641-1.
- Filbert, Preston, The Half not Told; the Civil War in a Frontier Town. Mechanicsburg, PA: Stackpole Books, 2001. ISBN 978-0-8117-1536-2.
- Howerton, Bryan R. "Re: Jacksonport 1865 surrender list?" Archived April 6, 2012, at the Wayback Machine Arkansas in the Civil War Message Board, Posted January 1, 2004. Accessed January 1, 2012,
- Morgan, James Logan. A Brief History of the 45th Arkansas Cavalry Regiment, C.S.A. Archived March 4, 2016, at the Wayback Machine The Stream of History, Volume 16, Part 4 (Oct. 1978). Accessed January 6, 2012.
- Sifakis, Stewart. Who Was Who in the Civil War. New York: Facts On File, 1988. ISBN 978-0-8160-1055-4.
- Silkenat, David. Raising the White Flag: How Surrender Defined the American Civil War. Chapel Hill: University of North Carolina Press, 2019. ISBN 978-1-4696-4972-6.
- "C1030 Thompson, Meriwether Jeff (1826-1876), Papers, 1854-1935" (PDF). The State Historical Society of Missouri. Archived from the original (PDF) on January 8, 2014.

Political offices
Preceded by John Corby	Mayor of St. Joseph, Missouri; 1857–1860	Succeeded by Armstrong Beattie
