= Siege of Vicksburg order of battle: Union =

The following Union Army units and commanders fought in the Siege of Vicksburg of the American Civil War. The Confederate order of battle is listed separately. Order of battle compiled from the army organization during the campaign.

== Abbreviations used ==
=== Military rank ===
- MG = Major General
- BG = Brigadier General
- Col = Colonel
- Ltc = Lieutenant Colonel
- Maj = Major
- Cpt = Captain
- Lt = Lieutenant
- Sgt = Sergeant

=== Other ===
- w = wounded
- mw = mortally wounded
- k = killed

== Army of the Tennessee ==
MG Ulysses S. Grant, Commanding

General Staff:

- Acting Inspector General: BG Jeremiah C. Sullivan
- Chief of Transportation: Col Joseph D. Webster
- Chief of Staff: Ltc John A. Rawlins

General Headquarters:

- Escort: 4th Illinois Cavalry, Company A: Cpt Embury D. Osband
- Engineers: 1st Battalion, Engineer Regiment of the West: Maj William Tweeddale
- Mississippi Marine Brigade: BG Alfred W. Ellet
  - Mississippi Ram Fleet: Col Charles Rivers Ellet
  - 1st Battalion Infantry: Ltc George E. Currie
  - 1st Battalion Cavalry: Major James M. Hubbard
  - Artillery Battery: Cpt Daniel Walling

=== IX Corps ===
MG John Parke

Division	Brigade	Regiments and Others
First Division BG Thomas Welsh	1st Brigade Col Henry Bowman	36th Massachusetts: Ltc John B. Norton; 17th Michigan: Ltc Constant Luce; 27th Michigan: Col Dorus M. Fox; 45th Pennsylvania: Col John I. Curtin
First Division BG Thomas Welsh	3rd Brigade Col Daniel Leasure	2nd Michigan: Col William Humphrey; 8th Michigan: Col Frank Graves; 20th Michigan: Ltc W. Huntington Smith; 79th New York: Col David Morrison; 100th Pennsylvania: Ltc Mathew M. Dawson
First Division BG Thomas Welsh	Artillery	Battery D, Pennsylvania Light: Cpt George W. Durell
Second Division BG Robert B. Potter	1st Brigade Col Simon Goodell Griffin	6th New Hampshire: Ltc Henry H. Pearson; 9th New Hampshire: Col Herbert B. Titus; 7th Rhode Island: Col Zenas Bliss
Second Division BG Robert B. Potter	2nd Brigade BG Edward Ferrero	35th Massachusetts: Col Sumner Carruth; 11th New Hampshire: Ltc Moses N. Collins; 51st New York: Col Charles Le Gendre; 51st Pennsylvania: Col John F. Hartranft
Second Division BG Robert B. Potter	3rd Brigade Col Benjamin C. Christ	29th Massachusetts: Ltc Joseph H. Barnes; 46th New York: Col Joseph P. Gerhardt; 50th Pennsylvania: Ltc Thomas S. Brenholtz
Second Division BG Robert B. Potter	Artillery	Battery L, 2nd New York: Cpt Jacob Roemer
	Artillery Reserve	Battery E, 2nd United States: Lt Samuel N. Benjamin

=== XIII Corps ===
MG John A. McClernand
MG Edward Ord

Escort

- 3rd Illinois Cavalry, Company L: Cpt David R. Sparks

Pioneers

- Kentucky Engineers (Independent Company): Cpt William F. Patterson

Division	Brigade	Regiments and Others
Ninth Division BG Peter J. Osterhaus	1st Brigade BG Albert L. Lee (w May 19); Col James Keigwin	118th Illinois: Col John G. Fonda; 49th Indiana: Maj Arthur J. Hawhe, Ltc Joseph H. Thornton; 69th Indiana: Col Thomas W. Bennett, Ltc Oran Perry; 7th Kentucky: Ltc John Lucas, Col Reuben May; 120th Ohio: Col Marcus M. Spiegel
Ninth Division BG Peter J. Osterhaus	2nd Brigade Col Daniel W. Lindsey	54th Indiana: Col Fielding Mansfield; 22nd Kentucky: Ltc George W. Monroe; 16th Ohio: Cpt Eli W. Botsford, Maj Milton Mills; 42nd Ohio: Ltc Don A. Pardee, Col Lionel A. Sheldon; 114th Ohio: Col John Cradlebaugh (w May 22), Ltc John H. Kelly
Ninth Division BG Peter J. Osterhaus	Cavalry	2nd Illinois Cavalry (5 companies): Ltc Daniel B. Bush Jr.; 3rd Illinois Cavalry (3 companies): Cpt John L. Campbell; 6th Missouri Cavalry (7 companies): Col Clark Wright
Ninth Division BG Peter J. Osterhaus	Artillery Cpt Jacob T. Foster	Battery F, 1st Michigan Light: Cpt Charles H. Lanphere; 1st Battery, Wisconsin Light: Lt Oscar F. Nutting
Tenth Division BG Andrew J. Smith Escort: 4th Indiana Cavalry, Company C: Cpt Andrew P. Gallagher	1st Brigade BG Stephen G. Burbridge	16th Indiana: Col Thomas J. Lucas, Maj James H. Redfield; 60th Indiana: Col Richard Owen; 67th Indiana: Ltc Theodore E. Buehler; 83rd Ohio: Col Frederick W. Moore; 96th Ohio: Col Joseph W. Vance; 23rd Wisconsin: Col Joshua James Guppey, Ltc William Freeman Vilas
Tenth Division BG Andrew J. Smith Escort: 4th Indiana Cavalry, Company C: Cpt Andrew P. Gallagher	2nd Brigade Col William J. Landram	77th Illinois: Col David P. Grier; 97th Illinois: Col Friend S. Rutherford, Ltc Lewis D. Martin; 130th Illinois: Col Nathaniel Niles; 19th Kentucky: Ltc John Cowan, Maj Josiah J. Mann; 48th Ohio: Ltc Job R. Parker (w May 22), Col Peter J. Sullivan
Tenth Division BG Andrew J. Smith Escort: 4th Indiana Cavalry, Company C: Cpt Andrew P. Gallagher	Artillery	Chicago Mercantile Battery, Illinois Light: Cpt Patrick H. White; 17th Battery, Ohio Light: Cpt Ambrose A. Blount, Cpt Charles S. Rice
Twelfth Division BG Alvin P. Hovey Escort: 1st Indiana Cavalry, Company C: Lt James L. Carey	1st Brigade BG George F. McGinnis	11th Indiana: Ltc William W. Darnall; 24th Indiana: Col William T. Spicely; 34th Indiana: Col Robert A. Cameron; 46th Indiana: Col Thomas H. Bringhurst; 29th Wisconsin: Col Charles R. Gill, Ltc William A. Greene
Twelfth Division BG Alvin P. Hovey Escort: 1st Indiana Cavalry, Company C: Lt James L. Carey	2nd Brigade Col James R. Slack	87th Illinois: Col John E. Whiting; 47th Indiana: Ltc John A. McLaughlin; 24th Iowa: Col Eber C. Byam, Ltc John Q. Wilds; 28th Iowa: Col John Connell; 56th Ohio: Col William H. Raynor
Twelfth Division BG Alvin P. Hovey Escort: 1st Indiana Cavalry, Company C: Lt James L. Carey	Artillery	Battery A, 1st Missouri Light: Cpt George W. Schofield; 2nd Battery, Ohio Light: Lt Augustus Beach; 16th Battery, Ohio Light: Lt Russell P. Twist
Fourteenth Division BG Eugene A. Carr Escort: 3rd Illinois Cavalry, Company G: Cpt Enos McPhail, Cpt Samuel S. Marrett	1st Brigade BG William P. Benton; Col Henry D. Washburn; Col David Shunk	33rd Illinois: Col Charles E. Lippincott; 99th Illinois: Col George W. K. Bailey, Ltc Lemuel Parke; 8th Indiana: Col David Shunk, Maj Thomas J. Brady; 18th Indiana: Col Henry D. Washburn, Cpt Jonathan H. Williams; 1st United States Infantry (siege guns): Maj Maurice Maloney
Fourteenth Division BG Eugene A. Carr Escort: 3rd Illinois Cavalry, Company G: Cpt Enos McPhail, Cpt Samuel S. Marrett	2nd Brigade BG Michael K. Lawler	21st Iowa: Ltc Cornelius W. Dunlap (k May 22), Maj Salue G. Van Anda; 22nd Iowa: Col William M. Stone (w May 22), Ltc Harvey Graham (c May 22), Maj Joseph B. Atherton, Cpt James Robertson, Cpt Charles N. Lee; 23rd Iowa: Col Samuel L. Glasgow; 11th Wisconsin: Col Charles L. Harris, Maj Arthur Platt
Fourteenth Division BG Eugene A. Carr Escort: 3rd Illinois Cavalry, Company G: Cpt Enos McPhail, Cpt Samuel S. Marrett	Artillery	Battery A, 2nd Illinois Light: Lt Frank B. Fenton, Cpt Peter Davidson; 1st Battery, Indiana Light: Cpt Martin Klauss

=== XV Corps ===
MG William T. Sherman

- Chief of Staff: Ltc John Henry Hammond
- Chief of Artillery: Maj Ezra Taylor

Division	Brigade	Regiments and Others
First Division MG Frederick Steele	1st Brigade Col Francis H. Manter; Col Bernard G. Farrar	13th Illinois: Col Adam B. Gorgas; 27th Missouri: Col Thomas Curley; 29th Missouri: Col James Peckham; 30th Missouri: Ltc Otto Schadt; 31st Missouri: Col Thomas C. Fletcher, Maj Frederick Jaensch, Ltc Samuel P. Simpson; 32nd Missouri: Maj Abraham J. Seay
First Division MG Frederick Steele	2nd Brigade Col Charles R. Woods	25th Iowa: Col George A. Stone; 31st Iowa: Col William Smyth, Maj Theodore Stimming; 3rd Missouri: Ltc Theodore Meumann; 12th Missouri: Col Hugo Wangelin; 17th Missouri: Col Francis Hassendeubel (mw July 2), Ltc John F. Cramer; 76th Ohio: Ltc William B. Woods
First Division MG Frederick Steele	3rd Brigade BG John M. Thayer	4th Iowa: Col James A. Williamson, Ltc George Burton; 9th Iowa: Maj Don. A. Carpenter, Cpt Frederick S. Washburn, Col David Carskaddon; 26th Iowa: Col Milo Smith; 30th Iowa: Col Charles H. Abbott (k May 22), Maj James P. Milliken (mw May 22), Cpt Robert D. Creamer
First Division MG Frederick Steele	Artillery	1st Battery, Iowa Light: Cpt Henry H. Griffiths; Battery F, 2nd Missouri Light: Cpt Clemens Landgraeber; 4th Battery, Ohio Light: Cpt Louis Hoffmann
First Division MG Frederick Steele	Cavalry	Kane County (Illinois) Independent Company: Lt Thomas J. Beebe; 3rd Illinois Cavalry, Company D: Lt Jonathan Kershner
Second Division MG Francis Preston Blair Jr.	1st Brigade Col Giles A. Smith	113th Illinois: Col George B. Hoge (w May 22), Ltc John W. Paddock; 116th Illinois: Col Nathan W. Tupper; 6th Missouri: Ltc Ira Boutell, Col James H. Blood; 8th Missouri: Ltc David C. Coleman (w May 22), Maj Dennis T. Kirby; 13th United States, 1st Battalion: Cpt Edward C. Washington (k May 19), Cpt Charles Ewing (w May 19), Cpt Charles C. Smith
Second Division MG Francis Preston Blair Jr.	2nd Brigade Col Thomas Kilby Smith; BG Joseph A. J. Lightburn	55th Illinois: Col Oscar Malmborg; 127th Illinois: Col Hamilton N. Eldridge; 83rd Indiana: Col Benjamin J. Spooner; 54th Ohio: Ltc Cyrus W. Fisher; 57th Ohio: Col Americus V. Rice (w May 22), Ltc Samuel R. Mott
Second Division MG Francis Preston Blair Jr.	3rd Brigade BG Hugh Boyle Ewing	30th Ohio: Ltc George H. Hildt (w May 22), Col Theodore Jones; 37th Ohio: Ltc Louis von Blessing (w May 22), Maj Charles Hipp, Col Edward Siber; 47th Ohio: Col Augustus C. Parry; 4th West Virginia: Col James H. Dayton
Second Division MG Francis Preston Blair Jr.	Artillery	Battery A, 1st Illinois Light: Cpt Peter P. Wood; Battery B, 1st Illinois Light: Cpt Samuel E. Barrett, Lt Israel P. Rumsey; Battery H, 1st Illinois Light: Cpt Levi W. Hart; 8th Battery, Ohio Light: Cpt James F. Putnam
Second Division MG Francis Preston Blair Jr.	Cavalry	Thielemann's (Illinois) Battalion, Companies A and B: Cpt Milo Thielemann; 10th Missouri Cavalry, Company C: Cpt Daniel W. Ballou, Lt Benjamin Joel
Third Division BG James M. Tuttle	1st Brigade BG Ralph P. Buckland; Col William L. McMillen	114th Illinois: Col James W. Judy; 93rd Indiana: Col De Witt C. Thomas; 72nd Ohio: Ltc Le Roy Crockett, Maj Charles G. Eaton; 95th Ohio: Col William L. McMillen, Ltc Jefferson Brumback
Third Division BG James M. Tuttle	2nd Brigade BG Joseph A. Mower	47th Illinois: Ltc Samuel R. Baker; 5th Minnesota: Col Lucius F. Hubbard; 11th Missouri: Col Andrew J. Weber (mw June 29), Ltc William L. Barnum; 8th Wisconsin: Col George W. Robbins
Third Division BG James M. Tuttle	3rd Brigade BG Charles L. Matthies; Col Joseph J. Woods	8th Iowa: Col James L. Geddes; 12th Iowa: Col. Joseph J. Woods, Ltc Samuel R. Edgington; 35th Iowa: Col Sylvester G. Hill
Third Division BG James M. Tuttle	Artillery Cpt Nelson T. Spoor	Battery E, 1st Illinois Light: Cpt Allen C. Waterhouse; 2nd Battery, Iowa Light: Lt Joseph R. Reed
	Unattached cavalry	4th Iowa Cavalry: Ltc Simeon D. Swan

=== XVI Corps (detachment) ===
MG Cadwallader C. Washburn

Division	Brigade	Regiments and Others
First Division BG William Sooy Smith Escort: 7th Illinois Cavalry, Company B: Cpt Henry C. Forbes	1st Brigade Col John Mason Loomis; Col Sanford J. Stoughton	26th Illinois: Maj John B. Harris; 90th Illinois: Col Timothy O'Meara; 12th Indiana: Col Reuben Williams; 100th Indiana: Ltc Albert Heath
First Division BG William Sooy Smith Escort: 7th Illinois Cavalry, Company B: Cpt Henry C. Forbes	2nd Brigade Col Stephen G. Hicks	40th Illinois: Maj Hiram W. Hall; 103rd Illinois: Col Willard A. Dickerman; 15th Michigan: Col John M. Oliver; 46th Ohio: Col Charles C. Walcutt
First Division BG William Sooy Smith Escort: 7th Illinois Cavalry, Company B: Cpt Henry C. Forbes	3rd Brigade Col Joseph R. Cockerill	97th Indiana: Col Robert F. Catterson; 99th Indiana: Col Alexander Fowler; 53rd Ohio: Col Wells S. Jones; 70th Ohio: Maj William B. Brown
First Division BG William Sooy Smith Escort: 7th Illinois Cavalry, Company B: Cpt Henry C. Forbes	4th Brigade Col William W. Sanford	48th Illinois: Ltc Lucien Greathouse; 6th Iowa: Col John M. Corse
First Division BG William Sooy Smith Escort: 7th Illinois Cavalry, Company B: Cpt Henry C. Forbes	Artillery Cpt William Cogswell	Battery F, 1st Illinois Light: Cpt John T. Cheney; Battery I, 1st Illinois Light: Lt William N. Lansing; Cogswell's Illinois Battery: Lt Henry G. Eddy; 6th Battery, Indiana Light: Cpt Michael Mueller
Fourth Division BG Jacob G. Lauman	1st Brigade Col Isaac C. Pugh	41st Illinois: Ltc John H. Nale; 53rd Illinois: Ltc Seth C. Earl; 3rd Iowa: Col Aaron Brown; 33rd Wisconsin: Col Jonathan Baker Moore
Fourth Division BG Jacob G. Lauman	2nd Brigade Col Cyrus Hall	14th Illinois: Ltc William Camm (c June 22), Cpt Augustus H. Cornman; 15th Illinois: Col George C. Rogers; 46th Illinois: Col Benjamin Dornblaser; 76th Illinois: Col Samuel T. Busey; 53rd Indiana: Col Walter Q. Gresham
Fourth Division BG Jacob G. Lauman	3rd Brigade Col George E. Bryant; Col Amory K. Johnson	28th Illinois: Maj Hinman Rhodes; 32nd Illinois: Col John Logan, Ltc William Hunter; 12th Wisconsin: Ltc De Witt C. Poole, Col George E. Bryant
Fourth Division BG Jacob G. Lauman	Cavalry	15th Illinois Cavalry, Companies F and I: Maj James G. Wilson
Fourth Division BG Jacob G. Lauman	Artillery. Cpt George C. Gumbart	Battery E, 2nd Illinois Light: Lt George Lewis Nispel; Battery K, 2nd Illinois Light: Cpt Benjamin F. Rodgers; 5th Battery, Ohio Light: Lt Anthony B. Burton; 7th Battery, Ohio Light: Cpt Silas A. Burnap; 15th Battery, Ohio Light: Cpt Edward Spear Jr.
Provisional Division BG Nathan Kimball	Engelmann's Brigade Col Adolph Engelmann	43rd Illinois: Ltc Adolph Dengler; 61st Illinois: Maj Simon P. Ohr; 106th Illinois: Maj John M. Hurt; 12th Michigan: Col William H. Graves
Provisional Division BG Nathan Kimball	Richmond's Brigade Col Jonathan Richmond	18th Illinois: Col Daniel H. Brush; 54th Illinois: Col Greenville M. Mitchell; 126th Illinois: Maj William W. Wilshire; 22nd Ohio: Col Oliver Wood
Provisional Division BG Nathan Kimball	Montgomery's Brigade Col Milton Montgomery	40th Iowa: Col John A. Garrett; 3rd Minnesota: Col Chauncey W. Griggs; 25th Wisconsin: Ltc Samuel J. Nasmith; 27th Wisconsin: Col Conrad Krez

=== XVII Corps ===
MG James B. McPherson

Escort

- 4th Company Ohio Cavalry: Cpt John S. Foster

Division	Brigade	Regiments and Others
Third Division MG John A. Logan Escort: 2nd Illinois Cavalry, Company A: Lt William B. Cummins	1st Brigade BG John E. Smith; BG Mortimer D. Leggett	20th Illinois: Maj Daniel Bradley; 31st Illinois: Ltc John D. Rees (mw May 22), Maj Robert N. Pearson; 45th Illinois: Maj Luther H. Cowan (k May 22), Col Jasper A. Maltby (w June 25), Ltc Melancthon Smith (mw June 25) Cpt John O. Duer; 124th Illinois: Col Thomas J. Sloan; 23rd Indiana: Ltc William L. Sanderson
Third Division MG John A. Logan Escort: 2nd Illinois Cavalry, Company A: Lt William B. Cummins	2nd Brigade BG Mortimer D. Leggett; Col Manning F. Force	30th Illinois: Ltc Warren Shedd; 20th Ohio: Col Manning F. Force, Cpt Francis M. Shaklee; 68th Ohio: Col Robert K. Scott; 78th Ohio: Ltc Greenberry F. Wiles
Third Division MG John A. Logan Escort: 2nd Illinois Cavalry, Company A: Lt William B. Cummins	3rd Brigade BG John Dunlap Stevenson	8th Illinois: Ltc Robert H. Sturgess; 17th Illinois: Ltc Francis M. Smith; 81st Illinois: Col James J. Dollins (k May 22), Col Franklin Campbell; 7th Missouri: Cpt Robert Buchanan, Cpt William B. Collins; 32nd Ohio: Col Benjamin F. Potts
Third Division MG John A. Logan Escort: 2nd Illinois Cavalry, Company A: Lt William B. Cummins	Artillery Maj Charles J. Stolbrand	Battery D, 1st Illinois Light: Cpt Henry A. Rogers, Lt George J. Wood, Cpt Frederick Sparrestrom; Battery G, 2nd Illinois Light: Cpt Frederick Sparrestrom, Lt John W. Lowell; Battery L, 2nd Illinois Light: Cpt William H. Bolton; Battery H, 1st Michigan Light Artillery: Cpt Samuel De Golyer, Lt Theodore W. Lockwood; 3rd Battery, Ohio Light: Cpt William S. Williams
Sixth Division BG John McArthur Escort: 11th Illinois Cavalry, Company G: Lt Stephen S. Tripp	1st Brigade (Post of Lake Providence) BG Hugh T. Reid	1st Kansas: Col William Y. Roberts; 16th Wisconsin: Col Benjamin Allen
Sixth Division BG John McArthur Escort: 11th Illinois Cavalry, Company G: Lt Stephen S. Tripp	2nd Brigade BG Thomas E.G. Ransom	11th Illinois: Col Garrett Nevins (k May 22), Ltc James H. Coates; 72nd Illinois: Col Frederick A. Starring; 95th Illinois: Col Thomas W. Humphrey (w May 22), Ltc Leander Blanden, Col Thomas W. Humphrey; 14th Wisconsin: Col Lyman M. Ward; 17th Wisconsin: Ltc Thomas B. McMahon, Col Adam G. Malloy
Sixth Division BG John McArthur Escort: 11th Illinois Cavalry, Company G: Lt Stephen S. Tripp	3rd Brigade Col William Hall; Col Alexander Chambers	11th Iowa: Ltc John C. Abercrombie, Col William Hall; 13th Iowa: Col John Shane; 15th Iowa: Col William W. Belknap; 16th Iowa: Ltc Addison H. Sanders
Sixth Division BG John McArthur Escort: 11th Illinois Cavalry, Company G: Lt Stephen S. Tripp	Artillery Maj Thomas D. Maurice	Battery F, 2nd Illinois Light: Cpt John Wesley Powell; 1st Battery, Minnesota Light: Lt Henry Hurter, Cpt William Z. Clayton; Battery C, 1st Missouri Light Artillery : Cpt Charles Mann; 10th Battery, Ohio Light: Cpt Hamilton Berlace White, Lt William L. Newcomb
Seventh Division BG Isaac Quinby; BG John E. Smith Escort: 4th Missouri Cavalry, Company F: Lt Alexander Mueller	1st Brigade Col John B. Sanborn	48th Indiana: Col Norman Eddy; 59th Indiana: Col Jesse I. Alexander; 4th Minnesota: Ltc John Eaton Tourtellotte; 18th Wisconsin: Col Gabriel Bouck
Seventh Division BG Isaac Quinby; BG John E. Smith Escort: 4th Missouri Cavalry, Company F: Lt Alexander Mueller	2nd Brigade Col Samuel A. Holmes; Col Green B. Raum	56th Illinois: Col Green B. Raum, Cpt Pinckney J. Welsh; 17th Iowa: Col David B. Hillis, Ltc Clark R. Wever, Maj John F. Walden; 10th Missouri: Maj Francis C. Deimling; 24th Missouri, Company E: Lt Daniel Driscoll; 80th Ohio: Col Matthias H. Bartilson, Maj Pren Metham
Seventh Division BG Isaac Quinby; BG John E. Smith Escort: 4th Missouri Cavalry, Company F: Lt Alexander Mueller	3rd Brigade Col George B. Boomer (k May 22); Col Holden Putnam; BG Charles L. Matthies	93rd Illinois: Col Holden Putnam, Ltc Nicholas C. Buswell, Col Holden Putnam; 5th Iowa: Ltc Ezekiel S. Sampson, Col Jabez Banbury; 10th Iowa: Col William E. Small; 26th Missouri: Cpt Benjamin D. Dean
Seventh Division BG Isaac Quinby; BG John E. Smith Escort: 4th Missouri Cavalry, Company F: Lt Alexander Mueller	Artillery. Cpt Frank C. Sands; Cpt Henry Dillon	Battery M, 1st Missouri Light: Lt Julius W. MacMurray; 11th Battery, Ohio Light: Lt Fletcher E. Armstrong; 6th Battery, Wisconsin Light: Cpt Henry Dillon, Lt Samuel F. Clark; 12th Battery, Wisconsin Light: Cpt William Zickerick
Herron's Division MG Francis J. Herron	1st Brigade BG William Vandever	37th Illinois: Col John C. Black; 26th Indiana: Col John G. Clark; 20th Iowa: Col William McEntyre Dye; 34th Iowa: Col George W. Clark; 38th Iowa: Col D. Henry Hughes; Battery E, 1st Missouri Light Artillery: Cpt Nelson Cole; Battery F, 1st Missouri Light Artillery: Cpt Joseph Foust
Herron's Division MG Francis J. Herron	2nd Brigade BG William W. Orme	94th Illinois: Col John McNulta; 19th Iowa: Ltc Daniel Kent; 20th Wisconsin: Col Henry Bertram; Battery B, 1st Missouri Light Artillery: Cpt Martin Welfley
	Unattached cavalry Col Cyrus Bussey	5th Illinois Cavalry: Maj Thomas A. Apperson; 3rd Iowa Cavalry: Maj Oliver H. P. Scott; 2nd Wisconsin Cavalry: Col Thomas Stephens

=== District of Northeast Louisiana ===
BG Elias S. Dennis

Brigades	Regiments and batteries
Detached Brigade Col George W. Neeley	63rd Illinois: Col Joseph B. McCown; 108th Illinois: Ltc Charles Turner; 120th Illinois: Col George W. McKeaig; 131st Illinois: Col George W. Neeley, Maj Joseph L. Purvis; 10th Illinois Cavalry, Companies A, D, G, and K: Maj Elvis P. Shaw
African Brigade Col Isaac F. Shephard	8th Louisiana: Col Hiram Scofield (also commanded Post of Milliken's Bend, La); 9th Louisiana: Col Hermann Lieb (w June 7), Maj Erastus N. Owen, Ltc Charles L. Page; 11th Louisiana: Col Edwin W. Chamberlain, Ltc Cyrus Sears; 13th Louisiana: Lt H. Knoll; 1st Mississippi: Ltc A. Watson Webber; 3rd Mississippi: Col Richard H. Ballinger
Post of Goodrich's Landing, La. Col William F. Wood	1st Arkansas: Ltc James W. Campbell; 10th Louisiana: Ltc Frederick M. Crandall
