= 1st Missouri Light Artillery Regiment =

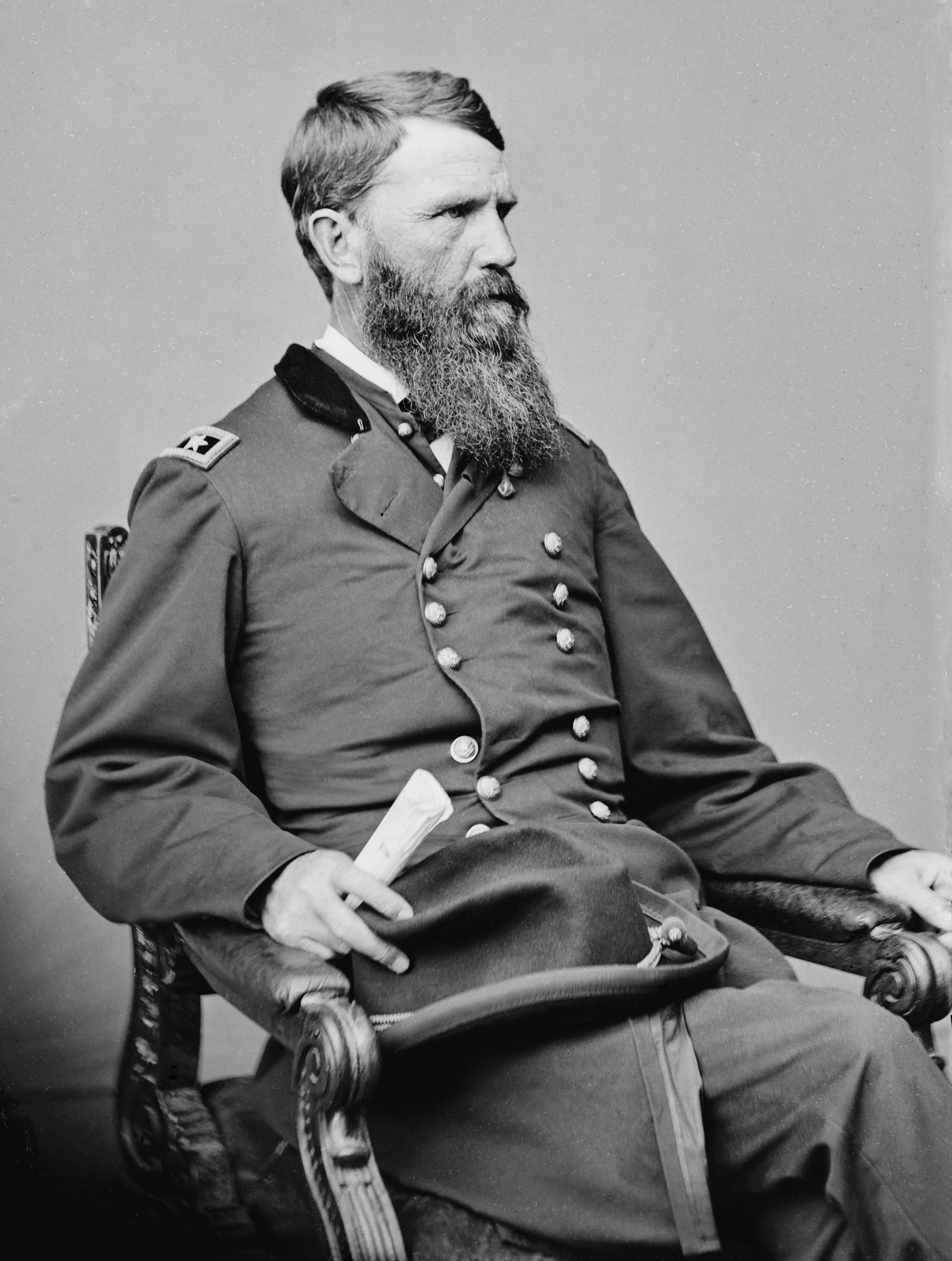
- Francis P. Blair Jr. was the regiment's first colonel.
- Active: 1 Sept. 1861 – 23 Aug. 1865
- Country: United States
- Allegiance: (United States) Union; Missouri
- Branch: Union Army
- Type: Artillery
- Size: Regiment
- Equipment: See Armament table.
- Engagements: American Civil War

Commanders
- Notable commanders: Francis Preston Blair Jr. Warren L. Lothrop

1st Missouri Light Artillery Regiment was an artillery unit from Missouri that served in the Union Army during the American Civil War. The unit began its service as the 1st Missouri Infantry Regiment, but converted to an artillery regiment in September 1861 and was brought up to a strength of 12 companies. Thereafter, each company served as an individual artillery battery, often separated from the other companies in the regiment. The individual batteries served in many actions in the Western Theater of the American Civil War and several batteries served together at key battles such as Fort Donelson, Shiloh, Corinth, Prairie Grove, and Vicksburg.

== Formation ==
The regiment's parent unit was formed on 10–12 June 1861 in St Louis and Boonville, Missouri, as the 1st Missouri Infantry Regiment, to serve three years. On 1 September 1861, the unit was re-designated the 1st Missouri Light Artillery Regiment. Soldiers enlisted in United States regular army units in 1860 and 1861 were transferred into the regiment as Battery L and Battery M. Batteries L and M brought the regiment up to the strength of 12 companies, with batteries named A through M, excluding J. Battery C was immediately disbanded in September 1861. Battery I and Battery L were disbanded in January 1862 and Battery B was disbanded in April 1862. The soldiers in Batteries B, C, I, and L were transferred to the other companies.

== Officers ==
=== Field officers ===
The original field officers were Colonel Francis Preston Blair Jr., Lieutenant Colonel James Totten, and Major John Schofield. Schofield was promoted brigadier general on 21 November 1861, Totten was appointed brigadier general of Missouri state militia on 19 February 1862, and Blair was promoted brigadier general on 7 August 1862. G. W. Cutler was adjutant, T. D. Witt was quartermaster, William Hill was surgeon, and Joseph Brooks was chaplain.

John V. Dubois was appointed colonel to rank from 1 September 1862, but he quickly resigned on 14 October 1862. Warren L. Lothrop was promoted lieutenant colonel on 19 February 1862 and became colonel on 1 October 1862. A. M. Powell became major on 1 September 1861 and became lieutenant colonel on 21 October 1862. G. Harry Stone was promoted major on 19 February 1862. Thomas D. Maurice became major on 21 November 1862. David Murphy became major on 19 March 1863 and resigned on 10 July 1863. Nelson D. Cole was elevated to the rank of major on 10 August 1863 and promoted colonel of the 2nd Missouri Light Artillery Regiment on 2 October 1863. Charles Mann became major on 21 October 1863. Frederick Welker was promoted major on 3 November 1864.

=== Company commanders ===
Original Company Commanders, 1st Missouri Artillery Regiment
Company	Captain	To Rank From
Battery A	George W. Schofield	1 September 1861
Battery B	Martin Welfley	13 August 1861
Battery C	Charles Mann	23 July 1861
Battery D	Henry Richardson	1 September 1861
Battery E	Nelson D. Cole	10 June 1861
Battery F	David Murphy	1 January 1862
Battery G	Henry Hescock	25 January 1862
Battery H	Frederick Welker	1 September 1861
Battery I	Charles S. Sheldon	27 March 1862
Battery K	Thomas D. Maurice	1 September 1861
Battery L	Frank Backof	25 July 1862
Battery M	Stillman O. Fish	19 February 1862

== Service ==
Mann's Independent Missouri Battery, formed 4 November 1861, was renamed Battery C, 1st Missouri Light Artillery in August 1862. Buel's Independent Battery, formed 12 July 1861, was reassigned as Battery I in August 1862. Battery A, Schofield's Light Artillery, formed 25 July 1862, was renamed Battery L in October 1862. Battery A, Missouri Artillery Battalion, formed 25 September 1861, was assigned as Battery B in December 1862. Battery E was mustered out at the end of its three-year term of service in June 1864. Company C, Segebarth's Pennsylvania Artillery was then reassigned as Battery E on 14 September 1864. Battery I was mustered out on 30 June 1864 at the end of its term of service. When Battery D reached the end of its term of service, its members mustered out except recruits and re-enlisted veterans. Battery D consolidated with Battery C on 11 April 1865. The remaining companies mustered out between 16 June and 23 August 1865.

== Casualties ==
The regiment suffered losses in the following list of actions. Actions are not listed if no losses were reported.

Union Army: 1st Missouri Artillery Regiment Casualties
Action	Company	Officers Killed	Enlisted Killed	Officers Wounded	Enlisted Wounded	Officers Missing	Enlisted Missing
Fort Donelson	D, H, K	0	0	0	1	0	0
Paris	I	1	0	0	0	0	0
Shiloh	C, D, H, K	0	1	2	24	0	0
Farmington	G	0	0	0	4	0	0
Bolivar	A	0	0	0	1	0	1
Corinth	D, H, I, K, M	0	6	0	12	0	0
Matamora	C	0	0	0	2	0	0
Prairie Grove	E, F, L	0	1	0	2	0	0
Stones River	G	0	0	0	12	0	1
Cherokee Station	I	0	1	0	1	0	22
Champion Hill	A, M	0	0	0	1	0	0
Vicksburg	A, B, C, E, F, M	0	2	0	4	0	0
Helena	K	0	0	0	1	0	0
Stirling's Plantation	E	0	3	0	3	0	12
Chickamauga	G	0	1	0	0	0	1
Tupelo	M	0	1	1	5	0	0
Atlanta	H	0	1	0	2	0	0
Savannah	H	0	0	0	2	0	0
Bentonville	H	0	0	0	1	0	0

== Armament ==
According to the 4th Quarter 1862 report, the batteries were armed with the artillery pieces shown in the table below, except where otherwise noted. By the time of the 4th Quarter 1863 report, several batteries were armed with different weapons. Battery A was rearmed with two M1841 6-pounder field guns, three M1841 12-pounder howitzers, and one 12-pounder Napoleon. Battery C was equipped with four M1841 12-pounder howitzers. Battery D was rearmed with three M1841 6-pounder field guns, two M1841 12-pounder howitzers, one M1841 24-pounder howitzer, and two 3-inch Ordnance rifles. Battery E had only two 10-pounder Parrott rifles and two 3.5-inch Blakely rifles. Batteries G and H were each rearmed with six 12-pounder Napoleons. Battery I was equipped with two M1841 6-pounder field guns, one M1841 12-pounder howitzer, two 10-pounder Parrott rifles, and one rifled M1841 12-pounder field gun. Battery L had only two 6-pounder rifles (3.67-inch) and two M1841 12-pounder howitzers.

Union Army: 1st Missouri Artillery Regiment Armament
Company	Date	6-pdr gun	12-pdr How	6-pdr rifle	3.8" James	10-pdr Parrott	Napoleon	12-pdr gun	20-pdr Parrott	24-pdr How	3.5" Blakely
Battery A	4th Qtr '62	4	2	0	0	0	0	0	0	0	0
Battery B	4th Qtr '62	0	4	0	0	0	0	2	0	0	0
Battery C	1st Qtr '63	2	2	0	0	0	0	0	0	0	0
Battery D	4th Qtr '62	0	0	0	0	0	0	0	5	0	0
Battery E	4th Qtr '62	0	0	0	0	4	0	0	0	0	2
Battery F	1st Qtr '63	0	0	0	2	0	0	0	0	0	4
Battery G	3rd Qtr '63	0	0	0	0	2	4	0	0	0	0
Battery H	4th Qtr '62	2	0	0	0	2	0	0	0	1	0
Battery I	4th Qtr '62	4	2	0	0	0	0	0	0	0	0
Battery K	4th Qtr '62	0	0	0	0	4	0	0	0	0	0
Battery L	2nd Qtr '63	0	2	4	0	0	0	0	0	0	0
Battery M	4th Qtr '62	0	0	0	0	4	0	0	0	0	0

== See also ==
- List of Missouri Union Civil War units
