= Battery E, 1st Missouri Light Artillery Regiment =

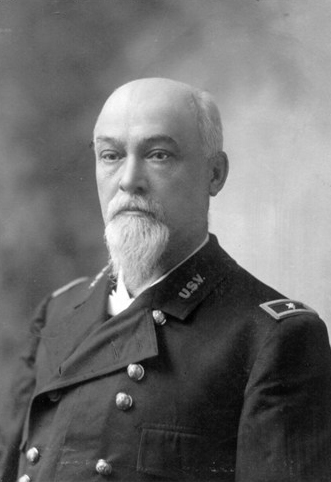
- Nelson D. Cole commanded Battery E at Vicksburg.
- Active: September 1861 – June 1864
- Country: United States
- Allegiance: (United States) Union; Missouri
- Branch: Union Army
- Type: Artillery
- Size: Artillery Battery
- Nickname: Cole's Battery
- Equipment: 4 x 10-pounder Parrott rifles and 2 x 3.5-inch Blakely rifles
- Engagements: American Civil War; Frémont's campaign (1861); Battle of Prairie Grove (1862); Battle of Van Buren (1862); Battle of Cape Girardeau (1863); Battle of Chalk Bluff (1863); Siege of Vicksburg (1863); Expedition to Morganza (1863); Battle of Brownsville (1863); Battle of Fort Esperanza (1863)

Commanders
- Notable commanders: Nelson D. Cole; Joseph Foust

Battery E, 1st Missouri Light Artillery Regiment was an artillery battery unit from Missouri that served in the Union Army during the American Civil War. The 1st Missouri Light Artillery Regiment formed on 1 September 1861. The battery participated in Frémont's expedition to Springfield in October 1861. This was followed by actions at Prairie Grove and Van Buren in December 1862. The following year, the battery fought at Cape Girardeau, Chalk Bluff, Vicksburg, the Expedition to Morganza, Brownsville, and Fort Esperanza. After performing garrison duty at Brownsville, Texas, the unit was mustered out in June 1864. For a few months at the end of 1864, a Pennsylvania battery took the name of this unit.

== Formation ==
The battery's parent unit began its existence on 10–12 June 1861 in St Louis and Boonville, Missouri as the 1st Missouri Infantry Regiment. On 1 September 1861, it was re-designated the 1st Missouri Light Artillery Regiment. At that time, Battery L and Battery M were transferred into the regiment from United States regular army units. These two batteries brought the regiment up to the strength of 12 companies, with batteries named A through M, excluding J. Battery C was disbanded in September 1861. Battery I and Battery L were disbanded in January 1862 and Battery B was disbanded in February 1862.

Captain Nelson D. Cole assumed command of Battery E upon its establishment; as a result, it was sometimes called Cole's Battery. Other officers were First Lieutenants John L. Woods, Cyrus L. Edwards, Lucien J. Barnes, and Joseph Foust and Second Lieutenant Robert Armstrong. Barnes was reported missing on 31 October 1862 and Edwards was discharged on 2 November 1862. Woods received promotion to captain and quartermaster on 15 November 1862. Armstrong was discharged in April 1863. Abram S. Hoaglund was appointed second lieutenant on 21 May 1863. Foust was promoted to captain of Battery F on 26 May 1863. Cole received promotion to major on 12 August 1863. Joseph B. Atwater was promoted captain on 16 October 1863. First Lieutenant Edward S. Rowland was appointed and awaiting muster into U.S. service.

== History ==
=== 1861–1862 ===
On 29 September 1861, Battery E left St Louis and marched to Jefferson City. Later, the battery was attached to the Department of the West and took part in Major General John C. Frémont's advance to Springfield, Missouri. The cavalry vanguard dispersed a Confederate force in the action at Springfield on 25 October 1861, while Frémont's main army arrived two days later. Soon after, Major General David Hunter assumed command of the army. On November 7, Hunter ordered a retreat in three columns, including one under Brigadier General John Pope to Sedalia. Battery E marched to Sedalia on 28 November.

Later, Battery E moved first to Otterville and then to Lexington, Missouri where it remained on duty from 11 February to 3 June 1862. The battery participated in operations near Waverly on 25–28 May. It was assigned to the District of Central Missouri, Department of the Missouri from January to June 1862. Battery E was on duty at Sedalia from 3 June to 29 July 1862. The unit marched to Rolla, Missouri on 29 July and returned to Sedalia on 18 August. The unit marched to Springfield from 29 August to 4 September. It was assigned to the District of Southwest Missouri from June to October 1862, when it was transferred to the 2nd Brigade, 3rd Division, within the Army of the Frontier.

=== Prairie Grove ===
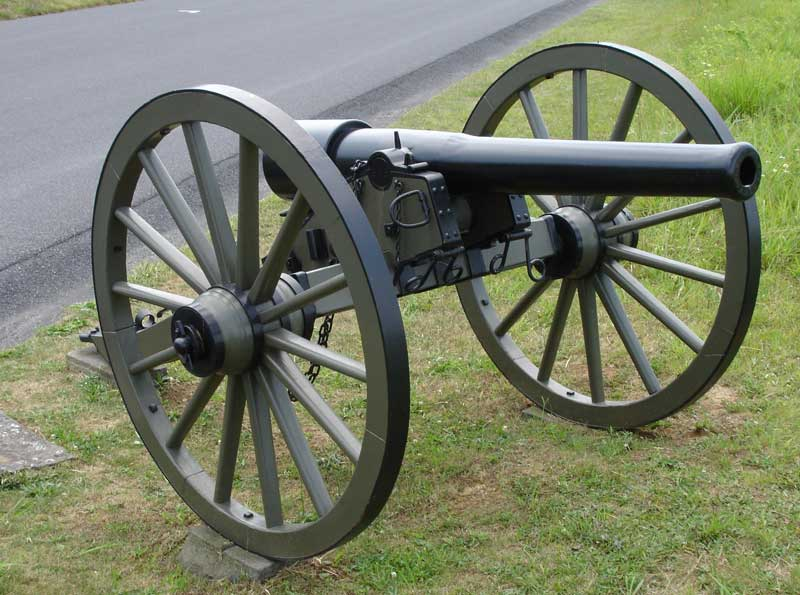
Battery E was armed with four 10-pounder Parrott rifles.

On 12 October 1862, the department commander Major General Samuel Ryan Curtis formed three divisions into the Army of the Frontier with Brigadier General John M. Schofield as its commander. Schofield's army entered northwest Arkansas on 17–18 October. On 28 October, Schofield with the 2nd and 3rd Divisions skirmished with Major General Thomas C. Hindman's Confederate forces. Hindman withdrew from the area the next day. On 4 November, Schofield withdrew the 2nd and 3rd Divisions from northwest Arkansas and pulled back to Springfield. On 20 November, Schofield reported sick and turned over command to Brigadier General James G. Blunt.

On 3 December, Hindman launched an offensive designed to crush Blunt's isolated 1st Division. However, Blunt's intelligence service alerted him at once and he called for reinforcements. Between 3 and 7 December, the 2nd and 3rd Divisions under Brigadier General Francis J. Herron made a remarkable forced march to Blunt's assistance, covering 105 and 120 mi (169 and 193 km) respectively. During the Battle of Prairie Grove, Battery E under Lieutenant Foust was attached to Colonel William W. Orme's 2nd Brigade in Herron's 3rd Division. The other units in the 2nd Brigade were the 19th Iowa and 94th Illinois Infantry Regiments, and the 8th Missouri Cavalry Regiment.

At 10:00 am on 7 December 1862, Herron found his two divisions blocked by Hindman's army on the Prairie Grove hill. He detached Lieutenant Edward's 2-gun section of Battery E and sent it forward with the purpose of getting the Confederate artillery to reveal its positions. After a 10-minute exchange of fire with two opposing batteries, Herron withdrew Edward's section. At 1:30 pm Battery F, 1st Missouri Light Artillery opened fire on the Confederate positions. Under Battery F's covering fire, Herron sent the rest of his 20 guns into action, including Battery E and Battery L, 1st Missouri Light Artillery. Battery E galloped forward, then swerved to the left to unlimber on a knoll to the east of the Fayetteville Road. Foust's gunners deployed four 10-pounder Parrott rifles and two 3-inch Ordnance rifles. Confederate counterbattery fire caused few Union casualties, though a near-miss round shot knocked Orme off his horse. Battery E's mascot, a dog named "Old Bull", chased Confederate projectiles during the cannonade. By 2:00 pm the Confederate guns fell silent and Herron's guns pounded their adversary's positions for the next 30 minutes. Foust's battery was "particularly effective" because it obtained enfilade fire on the Confederate lines from its forward position.

After the Confederates repulsed the Union 3rd Division's attack, they counterattacked and were stopped by the rallied Union infantry and fire from Batteries E and L and two Illinois guns. Foust reported that he "forced them back with canister". Herron complimented his gunners, "Never was there more real courage and pluck displayed, and more downright hard fighting done". When the Confederates drove back the 2nd Division's attack, they counterattacked again and the result was the same. The rallied Union foot soldiers and the gunners drove back their opponents with heavy fire. Afterward, Foust withdrew Battery E from the knoll and redeployed next to Battery L. The battery left behind eight dead horses and one caisson; there were 11 horses wounded.

Battery E participated in the expedition over the Boston Mountains to Van Buren on 27–29 December 1862. During this operation, the Union artillery bombarded the south bank of the Arkansas River. At Van Buren, the Federals burned five steamboats and tons of supplies needed by the Confederate army. In the 31 December 1862 summary statement, Battery E reported having four 10-pounder Parrott rifles and two 3.5-inch "English Guns". Frémont ordered the 3.5-inch guns early in the war. They were Blakely rifles manufactured by Fawcett & Preston in Liverpool. Battery E reported having the following 10-pounder ammunition: 420 Parrott common shell, 133 Schenkl common shell, and 131 Parrott canister shot. It also reported having 85 Army revolvers and 53 cavalry sabers.

=== 1863–1864 ===
Herron's division is at the bottom of the siege of Vicksburg map.

Battery E marched to Springfield, reaching there 15 February 1863. It remained on duty at Springfield and Rolla until April when it took part in operations against Brigadier General John S. Marmaduke's Confederate cavalry from 17 April to 2 May. The battery fought at the Battle of Cape Girardeau on 26 April. The Federal troops led by Brigadier General John McNeil drove off Marmaduke's attack. The defenders included Welfley's Missouri Battery and another battery from the 2nd Missouri Light Artillery Regiment, plus reinforcements of two cannons from a third battery. While pursuing Marmaduke, Battery E took part in skirmishes at the Castor River on 29 April, Bloomfield on 30 April, and at Chalk Bluff on 1 May. The battery moved to St Louis on 9 May. At some time in the early spring, Captain Cole resumed command of Battery E and the unit temporarily added a third 3.5-inch Blakely rifle.

On 4–16 June 1863, Battery E moved from St Louis to take part in the Siege of Vicksburg. At this time, Herron's division was re-assigned to XIII Corps which was led by John A. McClernand. During the Vicksburg siege, Battery E under Captain Cole was part of Brigadier General William Vandever's 1st Brigade, Herron's division, Major General James B. McPherson's XVII Corps, Army of the Tennessee according to Battles and Leaders. The siege was successfully concluded on 4 July. Battery E participated in the expedition to Yazoo City on 12–22 July. The unit moved to Port Hudson, Louisiana on 24 July and Carrollton on 16 August. After the Vicksburg siege, Battery E was part of the 2nd Division, XIII Corps. At Vicksburg, the battery reported having four 10-pounder Parrott rifles and two "Fawcett Rifled Iron Gun, Cal. 3.5" (i.e., Blakely rifles).

In August 1863, Battery E transferred to the Department of the Gulf. Batteries B, E, and F, 1st Missouri Light Artillery were assigned to Herron's 2nd Division, Major General Cadwallader C. Washburn's XIII Corps. Battery E took part in the expedition to Morganza on 5–12 September. There were skirmishes at the Atchafalaya River on 9–10 September and Sterling's Plantation on 12 September. The Battle of Stirling's Plantation occurred on 29 September. In this action, a Confederate force led by Tom Green attacked and overwhelmed a Federal detachment, inflicting 515 casualties. Part of Battery E fought at Stirling's Plantation and suffered the following losses in enlisted men: three killed, three wounded, and 12 missing. The battery traveled to New Orleans on 11 October. Major General Napoleon J.T. Dana commanded the 2nd Division from 28 September 1863 to 3 January 1864. At the end of 1863, Captain Atwater was in command and Battery E reported from Brownsville, Texas that it was armed with two 10-pounder Parrott rifles and two 3.5-inch Whitworth rifled guns. All earlier reports called the latter weapons "Fawcett" or "English" guns.

Battery E participated in the expedition to the Rio Grande from 27 October to 2 December 1863. On 6 November, the 13th Maine and 94th Illinois Infantry Regiments plus a Missouri battery occupied Brownsville. A total of 6,998 Union troops took part in the effort. The expedition's goals were to raise the U.S. flag in Texas, to cut off the cotton trade with Mexico, to damage the Texas economy, and to serve warning to the French occupation force in Mexico. On 16 November, 1,100 Federal troops seized Mustang Island and captured 98 Confederate soldiers and three heavy cannons. Soon after, the Union forces marched north on San José Island and crossed to Matagorda Island. At the Battle of Fort Esperanza, a battery of 1st Missouri Light Artillery bombarded the fort, which guarded the Pass Cavallo inlet. The fort was abandoned by the Confederate garrison on 29–30 November. Battery E performed garrison duty at Ducrow's Point and Brownsville before being mustered out in June 1864.

=== Reorganization ===
On 14 September 1864, Segebarth's Battery C Pennsylvania Artillery, Mississippi Marine Brigade was renamed Battery E, 1st Missouri Light Artillery. The new Battery E was attached to the artillery post of the District of Vicksburg until November. After that it served as garrison at both Vicksburg and Natchez. The new Battery E was mustered out of service on 1 January 1865. The officers were Captain Edmund H. Nichols, First Lieutenant Robert L. Crouch, and Second Lieutenants Hugh J. Randolph and Andrew J. Gibson.

== See also ==
- List of Missouri Union Civil War units
