= Battery F, 1st Missouri Light Artillery Regiment =

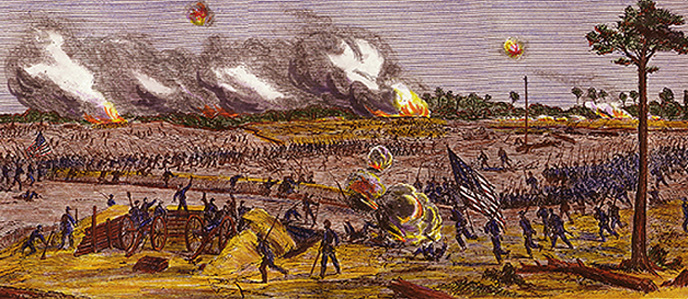
- Battery F was at the assault on Fort Blakeley in 1865.
- Active: December 1861 – 11 August 1864
- Country: United States
- Allegiance: (United States) Union; Missouri
- Branch: Union Army
- Type: Artillery
- Size: Artillery Battery
- Nickname: Murphy's Battery
- Equipment: 4 x 3.5-inch Blakely rifles and 2 x 14-pounder James rifles
- Engagements: American Civil War; Battle of Prairie Grove (1862); Battle of Van Buren (1862); Siege of Vicksburg (1863); Battle of Brownsville (1863); Battle of Mustang Island (1863); Battle of Fort Esperanza (1863); Battle of Spanish Fort (1865); Battle of Fort Blakeley (1865)

Commanders
- Notable commanders: David Murphy; Joseph Foust

Battery F, 1st Missouri Light Artillery Regiment was an artillery battery unit from Missouri that served in the Union Army during the American Civil War. The battery participated in operations in December 1861. Battery F fought at the battles of Prairie Grove and Van Buren in December 1862. The battery fought at Vicksburg, Brownsville, Mustang Island, and Fort Esperanza in 1863. The unit fought at Spanish Fort, and Fort Blakely in 1865. Battery F was mustered out on 11 August 1865.

== Formation ==
The battery's parent unit was created on 10–12 June 1861 in St Louis and Boonville, Missouri as the 1st Missouri Infantry Regiment. On 1 September 1861, the unit was re-designated the 1st Missouri Light Artillery Regiment. At that time, Battery L and Battery M were transferred into the regiment from United States regular army units. Adding these two batteries increased the regiment from 10 to 12 companies, with batteries named A through M, excluding J. Battery C was disbanded in September 1861. Battery I and Battery L were disbanded in January 1862 and Battery B was disbanded in February 1862.

Battery F's officers were Captain David Murphy, First Lieutenants James Marr, John L. Matthaei, and Frank A. Howard, and Second Lieutenants George Meyers, Siegmund Sallman, and Edward S. Rowland. Meyers resigned on 3 September 1861. Byron M. Callendar was promoted first lieutenant and Adjutant on 1 January 1862. Howard was discharged on 2 April 1862. Marr was promoted to captain of Battery M on 22 November 1862. Murphy was promoted to major on 1 April 1863; he was replaced as captain by Joseph Foust from Battery E on 26 May 1863. Rowland transferred to Battery E on 30 May 1863. Adolphus Stauber was promoted first lieutenant on 1 May 1863 and Louis Dorman was promoted second lieutenant on 1 July 1863. First Lieutenant William Arthur was promoted to captain of Battery G, 2nd Missouri Light Artillery on 2 January 1864. Matthaei was promoted to captain of the reorganized Battery C on 17 January 1864. First Lieutenant John H. Hogan was promoted captain in 1st Alabama Cavalry Regiment (Union) on 6 August 1864.

== Organization ==
District of Central Missouri to June, 1862. District of Southwest Missouri, Dept. Missouri, to October, 1862. 2nd Brigade, 2nd Division, Army of the Frontier, Dept. Missouri, to June, 1863. 1st Brigade, Herron's Division, 13th Army Corps, Army Tennessee, to July, 1863. Artillery, 2nd Division, 13th Army Corps, to August, 1863. 1st Brigade, 2nd Division, 13th Army Corps, Dept. of the Gulf, to September, 1863. Artillery, 2nd Division, 13th Army Corps, Dept. Gulf, to February, 1864. Artillery, 4th Division, 13th Army Corps, to June, 1864. Defenses New Orleans, La., to August, 1864. Reserve Artillery, Dept. Gulf, to December, 1864. District Southern Alabama, to February, 1865. 1st Brigade, 3rd Division, 13th Army Corps, Military Division West Mississippi, to August, 1865.

== History ==
SERVICE.--Duty at St. Louis and Clinton, Mo., until March, 1862, and in Central District of Missouri until June. Expedition to Milford, Mo., December 15–18, 1861. Shawnee Mound, Milford, December 18. Ordered to Springfield, Mo., June 3, 1862. Moved to Jefferson City August 16, to Sedalia August 18, and to Springfield August 26. Action at Lone Jack August 16. Schofield's Campaign in Southwest Missouri October, 1862, to January, 1863. Occupation of Newtonia October 4, 1862. Battle of Prairie Grove, Ark., December 7. Expedition over Boston Mountains to Van Buren, Ark., December 27–29. Duty at Springfield, Rolla, and other points in Southwest Missouri until April, 1863. Moved to St. Louis, Mo., and duty there until June. Moved to Vicksburg, Miss., June 3–16. Siege of Vicksburg, Miss., June 16-July 4. Expedition to Yazoo City July 12–22. Capture of Yazoo City July 14. Moved to Port Hudson, La., July 24, thence to Carrollton August 16. Expedition to the Rio Grande, Texas, October 24-December 2. Capture of Mustang Island November 17. Fort Esperanza November 27–30. Reconnaissance on Mattagorda Island January 21, 1864. Duty at Mattagorda Island until June, 1864. Moved to New Orleans, La., and duty there until December. Duty in District of Southern Alabama until March, 1865. Campaign against Mobile and its defenses March 17-April 12. Siege of Spanish Fort and Fort Blakely March 26-April 8. Fort Blakely April 9. Capture of Mobile April 12. Duty at Mobile and in District of Alabama until August. Mustered out August 11, 1865.

== Armament ==
At the Battle of Prairie Grove on 7 December 1862, Battery F was commanded by David Murphy. Its equipment consisted of four 3-inch Ordnance rifles and two 14-pounder James rifles (3.8-inch caliber) according to one source. The 1st quarter 1863 report stated that the battery was commanded by Joseph Foust and stationed at Rolla, Missouri. The unit had four 3.5-inch English Blakely rifles (manufactured by Fawcett & Preston of Liverpool) and two 3.8-inch James rifles. In September 1863, Battery F was at Carrollton, Louisiana and in December 1863 it was at Mustang Island on the Texas coast, in each place with the same armament as the 1st quarter 1863 report. The 4th quarter report from Pass Cavallo, Texas stated that there were four 3.5-inch Whitworth rifles (a possible error) and two 3.8-inch James rifles.

== See also ==
- List of Missouri Union Civil War units
