= Henry A. Hammel =

- Born: September 20, 1840; Germany
- Died: November 29, 1902 (aged 62); Missouri
- Burial place: Bellefontaine Cemetery, St. Louis, Missouri
- Military career
- Allegiance: United States of America
- Branch: United States Army
- Rank: First Sergeant
- Unit: Battery A, 1st Missouri Light Artillery
- Conflicts: American Civil War
- Awards: Medal of Honor

Henry A. Hammel (September 20, 1840 – November 29, 1902) was a Union Army soldier in the American Civil War who received the U.S. military's highest decoration, the Medal of Honor.

Hammel was born in Germany on September 20, 1840, and entered service at St. Louis, Missouri. He was awarded the Medal of Honor for extraordinary heroism, while a sergeant in Battery A, 1st Missouri Light Artillery, on April 28 and 29, 1863, on board the steamer Cheeseman at Grand Gulf, Mississippi. His Medal of Honor was issued on March 10, 1896.

He died at the age of 62, on November 29, 1902, and was buried at the Bellefontaine Cemetery in St. Louis, Missouri.

== Medal of Honor citation ==
The President of the United States of America, in the name of Congress, takes pleasure in presenting the Medal of Honor to Sergeant Henry A. Hammel, United States Army, for extraordinary heroism on April 28 & 29, 1863, while serving with Battery A, 1st Missouri Light Artillery, in action at Grand Gulf, Mississippi. With two comrades Sergeant Hammel voluntarily took position on board the steamer Cheeseman, in charge of all the guns and ammunition of the battery, and remained in charge of the same for considerable time while the steamer was unmanageable and subjected to a heavy fire from the enemy.

== See also ==
- Battery A, 1st Missouri Light Artillery
