= Battery B, 1st Missouri Light Artillery Regiment =

Union Army regiment in the American Civil War

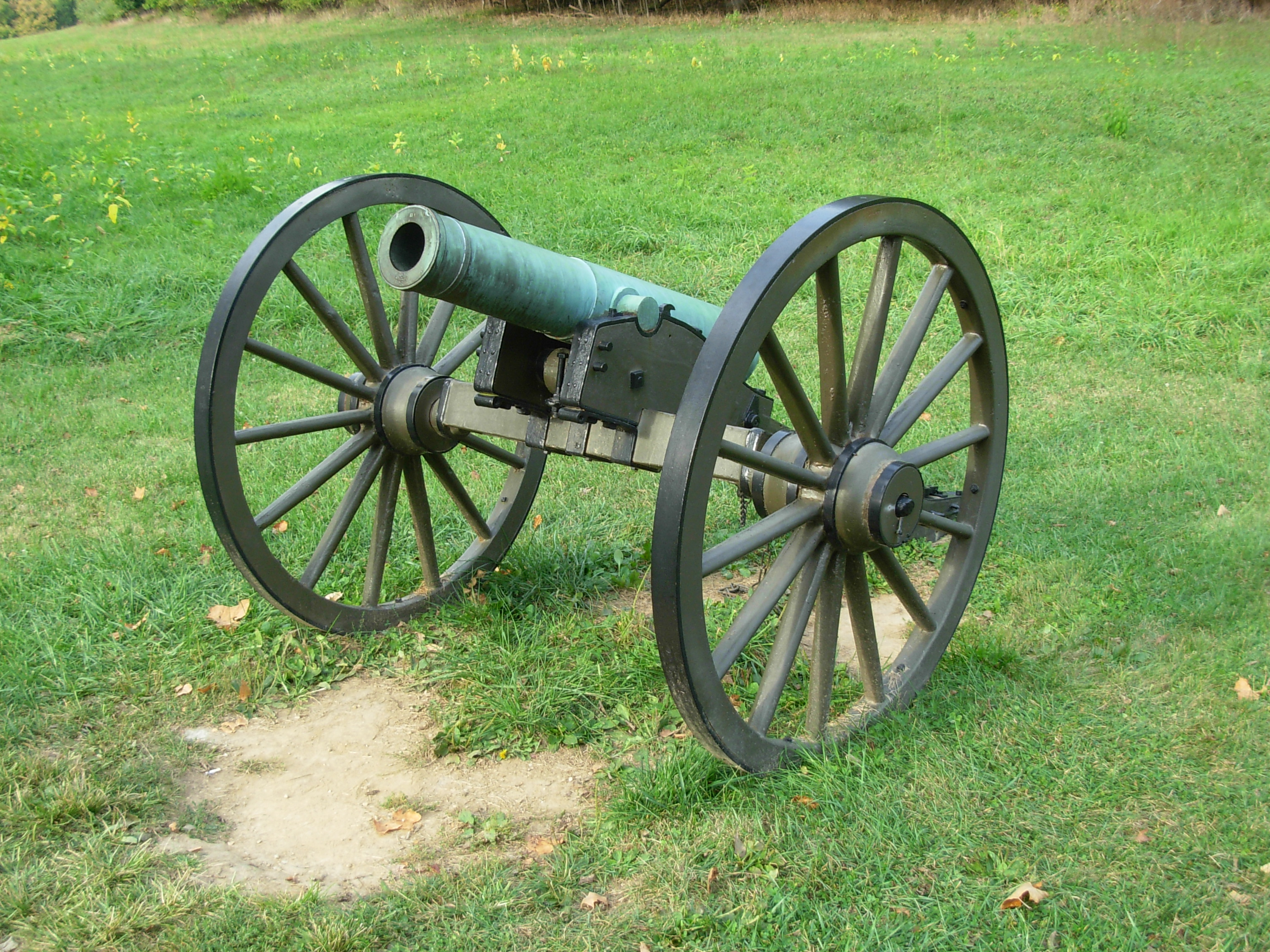
- At the Battle of Pea Ridge, the battery was armed with three M1841 12-pounder howitzers, like the one at the Antietam National Battlefield shown here.
- Active: 25 Sept. 1861 – 13 Sept. 1864
- Country: United States
- Allegiance: (United States) Union Missouri
- Branch: Union Army
- Type: Field Artillery
- Size: Battery
- Equipment: 4 M1841 12-pounder howitzers and 2 12-pounder guns (March 1862)
- Engagements: American Civil War; Battle of Pea Ridge (1862); White River campaign (1862); Battle of Cape Girardeau (1863); Battle of Chalk Bluff (1863); Siege of Vicksburg (1863); Battle of Stirling's Plantation (1863); Battle of Brownsville (1863)

Commanders
- Notable commanders: Martin Welfley

Battery B, 1st Missouri Light Artillery Regiment, also known as Welfley's Independent Missouri Battery, was an artillery battery that served in the Union Army during the American Civil War. Organized in September 1861, Welfley's Independent Battery fought at Pea Ridge and in the White River campaign. After its name changed to Battery B, 1st Missouri in December 1862, it fought at Cape Girardeau, Chalk Bluff, Vicksburg, Sterling's Plantation, and Brownsville. In September 1864, the unit ceased to exist when it was consolidated with three other Missouri batteries while stationed at New Orleans.

== Welfley's Independent Battery ==
=== Organizations ===
On 25 September 1861, Welfley's Independent Missouri Battery formed at St. Louis and was attached to the Department of the Missouri through January 1862. From that date the battery became part of the Army of the Southwest (or Army of Southwest Missouri) until March 1862. Welfley's Battery was attached to the artillery of the 1st Division, Army of the Southwest through May 1862. After a reorganization, the battery was attached to the artillery of the 3rd Division, Army of the Southwest through July 1862. From that date until October 1862 the unit belonged to the artillery of the District of Eastern Arkansas. From October to December 1862, Welfley's Battery was part of the District of Southeast Missouri.

=== History ===
Welfley's Battery was stationed at St. Louis and Rolla, Missouri until January 1862. It joined Samuel Ryan Curtis's campaign against Sterling Price in Missouri and Arkansas from January to March 1862. Advanced to Springfield, Missouri on 2–12 February and into Arkansas in pursuit of Price on 14–24 February. The battery served at the Battle of Pea Ridge on 7–8 March 1862. The unit consisted of four M1841 12-pounder howitzers and two 12-pounder guns under Captain Martin Welfley. However, one howitzer was detached on another assignment. (Note: Shea and Hess state that there were two "12-pounder guns". This might mean the 12-pounder Napoleon, but other pieces might fit this description.) On the first day, the three howitzers were sent to Leetown with the 1st Division under Colonel Peter J. Osterhaus. The three artillery pieces were ordered to support Cyrus Bussey's cavalry, but the Union horsemen were routed and stampeded through the battery as it moved forward. The gun crews managed to bring away two of the howitzers, but the third was abandoned in the confusion. Osterhaus sent the artillerists to retrieve the howitzer, covered by two companies of the 12th Missouri Infantry Regiment, and the lost gun was recovered.

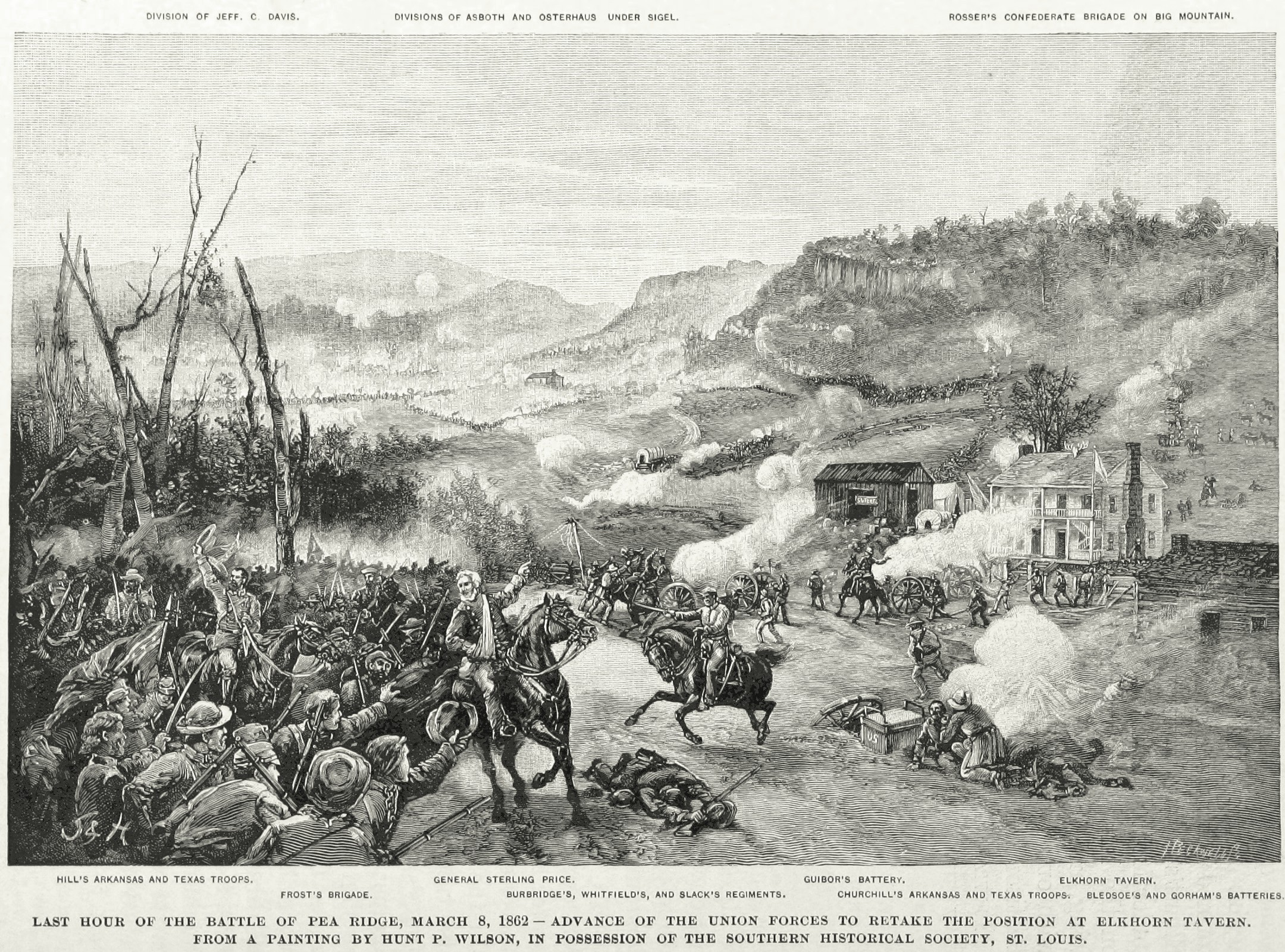
Battle of Pea Ridge, second day

Colonel Nicholas Greusel deployed his brigade along the southern edge of a cleared field with the 36th Illinois Infantry Regiment on the left, then in order, the 4th Ohio Battery, the 12th Missouri, Welfley's howitzers, and the 22nd Indiana Infantry Regiment on the right. With Osterhaus's approval, Welfley and the other battery commander began firing howitzer shells over the strip of woods in their front. The blind firing was surprisingly effective. When the first shells exploded, the Cherokee units panicked and were of no further help to the Confederate side. Welfley's guns also dispersed some Confederate horsemen on Little Mountain. Later, Welfley's three howitzers began shelling the woods to the east, where a Confederate brigade was battling Colonel Jefferson C. Davis's Union 3rd Division.

Early on the second day, General Franz Sigel sent Osterhaus to reconnoiter the terrain. When Osterhaus reported finding an excellent artillery position, Sigel ordered him to move forward with the 44th Illinois Infantry Regiment and that the rest of his units would follow. After the troops deployed, Sigel ordered Welfley forward to unlimber his five pieces on the crest of the ridge, which became known as "Welfley's Knoll". In all, 21 Federal guns deployed along the high ground, and under Sigel's direction, opened a highly effective bombardment of the Confederate positions near Elkhorn Tavern. The Union guns outdueled Good's Texas Battery and Clark's Missouri Battery and ultimately the Confederate commander Earl Van Dorn ordered a retreat.

Welfley's Battery accompanied Curtis's army in its march to Batesville, Arkansas on 5 April–3 May 1862. Elements of the battery fought at the Battle of Whitney's Lane on 19 May near Searcy on the Little Red River. From 25 May to 14 July, the battery served in the White River campaign, ending in the capture of Helena, Arkansas. It formed part of the garrison of Helena until October. Welfley's Battery participated in the expedition from Helena to the mouth of the White River on 5–8 August. The battery transferred to Ironton and Pilot Knob, Missouri on 1 October. Welfley's Battery was on duty in southeastern Missouri until December 1862 when it was renamed Battery B, 1st Missouri Light Artillery.

== Battery B, 1st Light Artillery ==
=== Organizations ===
The original Battery B, 1st Missouri Light Artillery Regiment was authorized at St. Louis on 1 September 1861. The unit was attached to the Department of the Missouri until January 1862. The original Battery B was briefly assigned to the 2nd Brigade, Army Southwest Missouri but disbanded in January 1862. Welfley's Battery Missouri Light Artillery was renamed Battery B, 1st Missouri Light Artillery Regiment in December 1862. From that date until March 1863, the unit was attached to Artillery, 2nd Division, Army of Southeast Missouri, Department of the Missouri. Battery B was part of Artillery, District of Southeast Missouri in March–June 1863. The unit was reassigned to Artillery, 2nd Brigade, Francis J. Herron's Division, XIII Corps, Army of the Tennessee in June–July 1863. Battery B transferred to Artillery, 2nd Division, XIII Army Corps, Army of the Tennessee in July–August 1863, and Army of the Gulf from then until June 1864. It was reassigned to Artillery, U.S. Forces, Texas in June–July, 1864. Battery B became part of the garrison of New Orleans in July–August 1864 and part of Reserve Artillery, Department of the Gulf in August–September 1864.

=== History ===
From December 1862 until June 1863, Battery B was on duty in southeast Missouri. These included operations against John S. Marmaduke's Confederate forces on 17 April–2 May. The Battle of Cape Girardeau was fought on April 26. Built in 1861, Forts A, B, C, and D protected Cape Girardeau, Missouri. Marmaduke's attack was repulsed by the Union defenders. There was a clash at the Castor River near Bloomfield, Missouri on 29–30 April. The Battle of Chalk Bluff on the St. Francis River occurred on 1–2 May. Battery B moved to Vicksburg, Mississippi on 2–10 June 1863. The unit participated in the Siege of Vicksburg on 11 June–4 July. The 2nd Brigade of Herron's Division was led by William W. Orme and included Battery B as well as the 19th Iowa, 20th Wisconsin, and 94th Illinois Infantry Regiments. Battery B was still commanded by Captain Welfley. After the capture of Vicksburg, Battery B took part in the expedition to Yazoo City on 12–21 July. Yazoo City was seized on 14 July.

The unit moved to Port Hudson, Louisiana on 23 July and from there to Carrollton on 12–13 August where it was on duty until 5 September. Battery B participated in the expedition to Morganza, Louisiana on 5 September–11 October 1863. There was a skirmish at Atchafalaya River on 7 September. The Battle of Sterling's Plantation occurred on 29 September. Battery B was at Morganza until 11 October when it moved to New Orleans. The battery took part in the expedition to Brazos Santiago, Texas on 27 October–2 December and the expedition to Brownsville on 4–9 November. It served in the Battle of Brownsville on 6 November. The battery made no official report in the fourth quarter of 1863. At that time it was still commanded by Welfley. It is not known if the battery was still armed with the same guns as at Pea Ridge, or if it had been re-equipped with new weapons. The battery was posted at Brownsville, Texas until July 1864. Battery B sailed to New Orleans on 24 July–7 August. It was assigned to the Reserve Artillery at New Orleans until September 1864. Battery B was consolidated with Batteries F and G into Battery A, 1st Missouri Light Artillery on 13 September 1864 and ceased to exist as an independent unit. The consolidated Battery A was mustered out on 23 August 1865.

== See also ==
- List of Missouri Union Civil War units

== Notes ==
Footnotes

Citations
