= George W. Schofield =

American Civil War Union Brigadier General (1833-1882)

George Wheeler Schofield
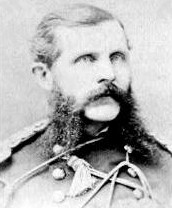
- Born: 20 September 1833; Gerry, New York, U.S.
- Died: 17 December 1882 (aged 49); Fort Apache, Arizona, U.S.
- Burial place: Freeport City Cemetery; Freeport, Illinois, U.S.
- Military career
- Allegiance: United States of America
- Branch: Union Army
- Service years: 1861–1879
- Units: 1st Missouri Infantry Regiment; 1st Missouri Light Artillery Regiment; 41st Infantry Regiment; 10th Cavalry Regiment; 6th Cavalry Regiment
- Conflicts: American Civil War; Indian Wars

George Wheeler Schofield (September 20, 1833 – December 17, 1882) was an American Union brevet brigadier general during the period of the American Civil War. He received his appointment as brevet brigadier general dated to January 26, 1865.

George Wheeler Schofield was the brother of John McAllister Schofield who briefly served as Commander of the Army of the Frontier during the Civil War and as U.S. Secretary of War, Superintendent of the United States Military Academy, and Commanding General of the United States Army after the war. During the American Civil War, George Wheeler Schofield served as a lieutenant colonel in the Union Army. After the war, he served with the 41st Infantry and the 10th and 6th cavalries.

The Schofield Revolver, a .45-caliber Smith & Wesson revolver, was named after him. Schofield made modifications to the original Model 3 revolver, patented his locking system, and earned a payment on each gun that Smith & Wesson sold. His older brother John was the head of the Army Ordnance Board at the time, and this conflict-of-interest may have been the main reason for the Army's adoption of Schofield's revolver.

Schofield's wife Alma, sister of frontiersman Seth Bullock, died at Fort Sill on March 27, 1879. Schofield was promoted to the peacetime rank of lieutenant colonel of the 6th Cavalry in December 1881. He served in Arizona. On December 17, 1882, Schofield picked up one of his Schofield-patent revolvers while in his dress uniform and fatally shot himself with it. He was buried in the city cemetery of Freeport, Illinois.
