= Battery I, 1st Missouri Light Artillery Regiment =

- Active: 12 July 1861 – 30 June 1865
- Country: United States
- Allegiance: (United States) Union Missouri
- Branch: Union Army
- Type: Field Artillery
- Size: Battery
- Equipment: 2 M1841 6-pounder field guns, 1 M1841 12-pounder howitzer, 2 10-pounder Parrott rifles, 1 rifled M1841 12-pounder field gun
- Engagements: American Civil War; Battle of Shiloh (1862); Siege of Corinth (1862); Second Battle of Corinth (1862); Battle of Resaca (1864); Battle of Rome Cross Roads (1864); Battle of Nashville (1864)

Commanders
- Notable commanders: James T. Buel; Charles H. Thurber; Benjamin Tannrath

Battery I, 1st Missouri Light Artillery Regiment, also known as Buel's Independent Missouri Battery, was an artillery battery that served in the Union Army during the American Civil War. Organized in July 1861, Buell's Independent Battery fought at Shiloh and in the Corinth siege. After its name changed to Battery I, 1st Missouri Light Artillery Regiment in August 1862, it fought at Corinth, in operations supporting Streight's Raid, at Resaca, and at Rome Cross Roads before being assigned to the Nashville garrison. It fought at the Battle of Nashville and was mustered out in June 1865.

== Buel's Independent Battery ==
=== Organizations ===
Organized at St. Louis, Mo., July 12, 1861. Attached to Dept. of Missouri to February, 1862. 1st Brigade, 3rd Division, District of West Tennessee, to March, 1862. Artillery 3rd Division, Army of the Tennessee, to April, 1862. Artillery 2nd Division, Army of the Tennessee, to June, 1862. Artillery 2nd Brigade, 3rd Division, Army of the Mississippi, to August, 1862.

=== History ===
Dug Springs, Mo., August 2, 1861. At Sulphur Springs, Mo., August. Ordered to Cape Girardeau, Mo., August 25. Duty there and in Missouri to February, 1862. Ordered to Join Army of the Tennessee. Expedition to Purdy and operations about Crump's Landing, Tenn., March 14–17. Paris March 11. Battle of Shiloh April 6–7. Paris April 10. Advance on and siege of Corinth, Miss., April 29-May 30. Expedition to Ripley June 27-July 1. At Camp Clear Creek until August 15. Assigned to 1st Missouri Light Artillery as Battery "I," August, 1862. For further service see that Battery.

== Battery I, 1st Missouri Light Artillery Regiment ==
=== Organizations ===
Original Battery disbanded January, 1862, having served at St. Louis, Mo. Battery reorganized August, 1862, from Buel's Independent Battery Light Artillery. Attached to Artillery, District of Corinth, Miss., Dept. Tennessee, to November, 1862. Artillery, District of Corinth, Miss., 13th Army Corps (Old), Dept. Tennessee, to December, 1862. Artillery, District of Corinth, 17th Army Corps, to January, 1863. Artillery, District of Corinth, 16th Army Corps, to March, 1863. Artillery, 2nd Division, 16th Army Corps, to May, 1864. District of Nashville, Tenn., Dept. of the Cumberland, to June, 1865.

=== History ===
Duty at Corinth. Miss., until October, 1862. Battle of Corinth October 3–4. Pursuit to Ripley October 5–12. Duty at Corinth until April, 1863. Bear Creek December 9, 1862. Raid from Corinth to Tupelo December 13–19. Tallahatchie River January 17, 1863. Dodge's Expedition to Northern Alabama April 15-May 8. Dickson's Station, Lundy's Lane and Great Bear Creek April 17. Rock Cut, near Tuscumbia, April 22. Tuscumbia April 23. Town Creek April 28. Expedition from Pocahontas to New Albany and Ripley, Miss., June 12–14. Operations in Northeast Mississippi June 12–22 (Section). Operations in North Mississippi and West Tennessee against Chalmers October 4–17. Salem October 8. Ingraham's Mills near Byhalia October 12. Wyatt's, Tallahatchie River, October 13. Moved to Pulaski, Tenn., October 30-November 12, and duty along Nashville & Decatur Railroad, and at Decatur until April 1864. Atlanta (Ga.) Campaign May 1–22. Demonstrations on Resaca May 5–13. Sugar Valley May 9, Battle of Resaca May 13–14. Ley's Ferry, Oostenaula River, May 14–15. Rome Cross Roads May 16. Relieved May 22, and ordered to Nashville, Tenn. Garrison duty there until June, 1865. Battle of Nashville December 15–16, 1864 (Reserve). Mustered out June 30, 1865.

== See also ==
- "A Compendium of the War of the Rebellion: Battery I, 1st Regiment Light Artillery Missouri". Civil War Archive. 2016 [1908].
- "A Compendium of the War of the Rebellion: Buell's Independent Battery Light Artillery". Civil War Archive. 2016 [1908].
- List of Missouri Union Civil War units
