= 94th Illinois Infantry Regiment =

94th Regiment Illinois Volunteer Infantry
- Illinois flag
- Active: August 20, 1862, to July 17, 1865
- Country: United States
- Allegiance: Union
- Branch: Infantry
- Size: 1,094 At Muster-In
- Nickname: "McLean County Regiment"
- Engagements: Battle of Prairie Grove; Siege of Vicksburg; Battle of Brownsville; Fort Morgan; Operations against Mobile, Alabama

The 94th Regiment Illinois Volunteer Infantry, nicknamed the "McLean County Regiment," was an infantry regiment that served in the Union Army during the American Civil War.

== Service ==
The 94th Illinois Infantry was organized in McLean County, Illinois and mustered into Federal service on August 20, 1862, The Regiment Was Composed Entirely of Residents from the Mclean County, And so it was Given The Nickname the "Mclean County Regiment"

The regiment was mustered out on July 17, 1865, at Galveston, Texas.

== Total strength and casualties ==
The regiment suffered 9 enlisted men who were killed in action or who died of their wounds and 4 officers and 162 enlisted men who died of disease, for a total of 175 fatalities.

== Commanders ==
- Colonel William W. Orme - Promoted to brigadier general on April 4, 1863.
- Colonel John McNulta - Mustered out with the regiment.

== See also ==
- List of Illinois Civil War Units
- Illinois in the American Civil War
