= William W. Orme =

American lawyer

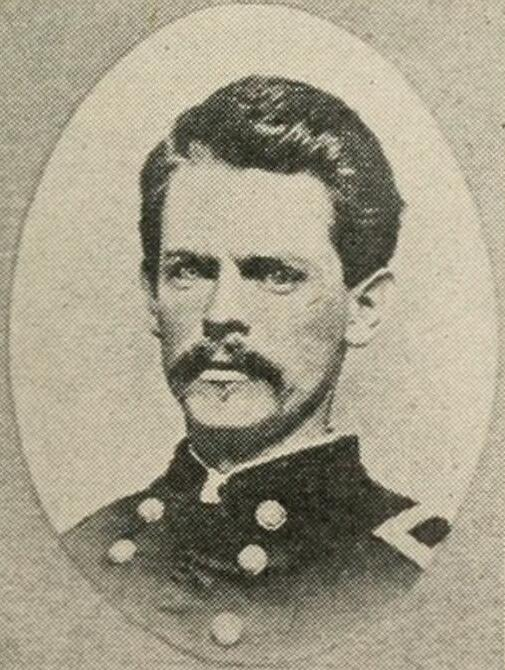
- Portrait of Orme in a 1908 publication
- Born: February 17, 1832; Washington, D.C.
- Died: September 13, 1866; Bloomington, Illinois
- Burial place: Evergreen Memorial Cemetery, Bloomington, Illinois
- Military career
- Allegiance: United States of America; Union
- Branch: United States Army; Union Army
- Service years: 1862-1864
- Rank: Brigadier General of Volunteers
- Commands: 94th Illinois Infantry; Camp Douglas Prison
- Conflicts: American Civil War: Battle of Prairie Grove; Siege of Vicksburg
- Other work: lawyer

Brigadier General William Ward Orme (1832-1866) was born in Washington, D.C. in 1832. He moved to Bloomington, Illinois, in McLean County, prior to 1860, where he practiced law in the law firm of Swett & Orme. His partner was Leonard Swett. While practicing law in Illinois, he caught the attention of Abraham Lincoln, who called Orme the most promising lawyer in Illinois.

He was a delegate to the Illinois State Constitutional Convention in 1860. He was a friend of Supreme Court Justice David Davis. When Abraham Lincoln appointed Davis to the Supreme Court, Davis wrote Orme about the news.

Orme formed and commanded the 94th Illinois Volunteer Infantry Regiment, known as the "McLean Regiment." At the time, he was a colonel. He led a brigade under Francis J. Herron at the Battle of Prairie Grove and, for his performance there, was promoted to brigadier general postdated to 29 November 1862. Herron's division was transferred to the Army of the Tennessee and Orme continued in command of his brigade during the Siege of Vicksburg. Upon the Confederate surrender, Orme's brigade led the Union army into the fallen city.

It was during his time in Mississippi that Orme contracted tuberculosis. His brigade was transferred to the Department of the Gulf, but he was soon forced to relinquish his command due to failing health. He was appointed commander of the Camp Douglas Prison, but even that became too difficult for his health. He retired from the military in 1864 to become Supervising Agent for the United States Treasury. Orme succumbed to his illness and died in 1866 at his home in Illinois.

A collection of Orme's papers is held by the University of Illinois Library's Illinois History and Lincoln Collections.

A bronze marker in Orme's honor was erected in 1917 at Vicksburg National Military Park

== See also ==
- List of American Civil War generals (Union)
