= Battery C, 1st Missouri Light Artillery Regiment =

- Active: 4 Nov. 1861 – 11 July 1865
- Country: United States
- Allegiance: (United States) Union Missouri
- Branch: Union Army
- Type: Field Artillery
- Size: Battery
- Equipment: 4 M1841 12-pounder howitzers
- Engagements: American Civil War; Battle of Shiloh (1862); Siege of Corinth (1862); Battle of Hatchie's Bridge (1862); Battle of Port Gibson (1863); Battle of Raymond (1863); Battle of Jackson (1863); Battle of Champion Hill (1863); Battle of Big Black River (1863); Siege of Vicksburg (1863); Meridian campaign (1864); Atlanta campaign (1864)

Commanders
- Notable commanders: Charles Mann

Battery C, 1st Missouri Light Artillery Regiment, also known as Mann's Independent Missouri Battery, was an artillery battery that served in the Union Army during the American Civil War. Organized between November 1861 and February 1862, Mann's Independent Battery fought at Shiloh and in the Corinth siege. After its name changed to Battery C, 1st Missouri in August 1862, it fought at Hatchie's Bridge, the Vicksburg campaign, the Meridian campaign, and the Atlanta campaign. In November 1864, the battery was assigned to the Nashville garrison; it remained there until it was mustered out in July 1865.

== Mann's Independent Battery ==
=== Organizations ===
Organized at St. Louis, Mo., November 4, 1861, to February 14, 1862. Attached to 2nd Brigade, 4th Division, District of West Tennessee, to March, 1862. Artillery 4th Division, Army of the Tennessee, to July, 1862. 2nd Brigade, 4th Division, District of Memphis, Tenn., Dept. of the Tennessee, to August, 1862.

=== History ===
Ordered to Join Army of the Tennessee February, 1862. Battle of Shiloh, Tenn., April 6–7. Advance on and siege of Corinth, Miss., April 29-May 30. March to Memphis, Tenn., via Grand Junction, June 1-July 21. and duty there until August. Assigned to 1st Missouri Light Artillery as Battery "C" August, 1862, and for further service see that Battery.

== Battery C, 1st Light Artillery ==
=== Organizations ===
Original Battery "C" disbanded September, 1861. Reorganized from Mann's Independent Battery Missouri Light Artillery August, 1862. Attached to Artillery, District of Memphis, Tenn., Dept. Tennessee, to September, 1862. Artillery, 4th Division, District of Jackson, Tenn., to November, 1862. Artillery, 4th Division, Left Wing 10th Army Corps (Old), Dept. of the Tennessee, to December, 1862. 2nd Brigade, 6th Division, 16th Army Corps, to January, 1863. 2nd Brigade, 6th Division, 17th Army Corps, to September, 1863. Artillery, 1st Division, 17th Army Corps, to April, 1864. Artillery, 4th Division, 17th Army Corps, to November, 1864. Artillery Reserve, Nashville, Tenn., Dept. Cumberland, to July, 1865.

=== History ===
Duty at Memphis, Tenn., until September 6, 1862. March to Bolivar, Tenn., September 6–14, and duty there until October 4. Expedition from Bolivar to Grand Junction and LaGrange, and skirmishes, September 20–22. Battle of Metamora, Hatchie River, October 5. Grant's Central Mississippi Campaign October 31, 1862, to January 10, 1863. Moved to Memphis, Tenn., thence to Lake Providence, La., January 18, 1863, and duty there until April. Movement on Bruinsburg and turning Grand Gulf April 25–30. Battle of Port Gibson May 1 (Reserve). Battle of Raymond May 12. Jackson May 14. Champion's Hill May 16. Big Black River May 17. Siege of Vicksburg, Miss., May 18-July 4. Assaults on Vicksburg May 19 and 22. Expedition to Mechanicsburg May 26-June 4. Surrender of Vicksburg July 4. Advance on Jackson, Miss., July 5–10. At Vicksburg until April, 1864. Expedition to Monroe, La., August 20-September 2, 1863. Expedition to Canton October 14–20. Meridian Campaign February 3-March 2, 1864. Moved to Clifton, Tenn., thence march to Ackworth, Ga., via Huntsville and Decatur, Ala., and Rome, Ga., April 21-June 8. Atlanta (Ga.) Campaign June 8-September 8. Assigned to duty at Allatoona, Marietta and Kenesaw Mountain until October. Operations against Hood until November. Ordered to Nashville, Tenn., and duty there until July, 1865. Mustered out July 11, 1865.

=== Armament and commanders ===
While at Vicksburg in 1863, the battery reported having four M1841 12-pounder howitzers. In November 1863, Captain Charles Mann was promoted major and sent home to recruit. Mann was replaced as commander by Lieutenant Wendolin Meyer until 17 January 1864 when Captain John L. Matthaei took over. During the last quarter of 1863, the battery ordered 240 shells, 240 shrapnel shells, 128 canister shot, 60 paper fuses, and 400 friction primers. The unit also ordered two Colt M1861 Navy pistols and four horse artillery sabers.

== See also ==
- List of Missouri Union Civil War units
