= Battery A, 1st Missouri Light Artillery Regiment =

- Active: Sept. 1, 1861 – Aug. 23, 1865
- Country: United States
- Allegiance: (United States) Union Missouri
- Branch: Artillery
- Type: Field Artillery
- Size: Battery
- Engagements: Battle of Fredericktown; Battle of Hill's Plantation; Battle of Port Gibson; Battle of Champion Hill; Battle of Big Black River Bridge; Siege of Vicksburg, May 19 & May 22 assaults Bayou Teche Campaign; Red River Campaign

Commanders
- Notable commanders: George W. Schofield

Battery A, 1st Missouri Light Artillery Regiment was an artillery battery that served in the Union Army during the American Civil War.

== Service ==
The regiment and its batteries were organized at St. Louis, Missouri from the 1st Missouri Infantry and mustered in for a three year enlistment on September 1, 1861 under the command of Captain George W. Schofield.

The battery was attached to Department of the Missouri, to January 1862. 2nd Brigade, Army of Southeast Missouri, to March 1862. Steele's Command, Army of Southeast Missouri, to May 1862. Artillery, 1st Division, Army of Southwest Missouri, to July 1862. District of Eastern Arkansas, Department of the Missouri, to October 1862. District of Southeast Missouri, Department of the Missouri, to January 1863. Artillery, 13th Division, XIII Corps, Department of the Tennessee, to March 1863. Artillery, 12th Division, XIII Corps, to July 1863. Artillery, 3rd Division, XIII Corps, Department of the Tennessee, to August 1863, and Department of the Gulf to July 1864. Defenses of New Orleans, Louisiana, Department of the Gulf, to August 1864. Reserve Artillery, Department of the Gulf, to April 1865. Hawkins' Colored Division, Military Division West Mississippi, to June 1865. Department of Alabama to August 1865.

Battery A, 1st Missouri Light Artillery mustered out of service August 23, 1865.

== Detailed service ==
Operations about Ironton and Fredericktown, Mo., October 12–21, 1861. Engagement at Fredericktown-Ironton February 21. Duty in southeast Missouri until March 1862. Ordered to Pilot Knob, then marched to Reeve's Station March 23–27. Moved to Pocahontas, Ark., April 5–11, then to Jacksonport May 3, and to Batesville March 24. March to Augusta June 20-July 4, then to Clarksville and Helena, Ark., July 5–14. Action at Hill's Plantation, Cache River, July 7. Duty at Helena, Ark, to October 3. Moved to Pilot Knob, Mo., October 3. Operations in southeast Missouri until December. Moved to St. Louis, Mo., then to Columbus, Ky., December 19–25, and to Helena, Ark., January 5–7, 1863. Expedition to Duvall's Bluff, Ark., January 16–20. Expedition to Yazoo Pass, and operations against Fort Pemberton and Greenwood February 24-April 8. Moved to Milliken's Bend. La., April 14. Movement on Bruinsburg and turning Grand Gulf April 25–30. Battle of Thompson's Hill, Port Gibson, Miss., May 1. Fourteen Mile Creek May 12. Battle of Champion Hill May 16. Big Black River May 17. Siege of Vicksburg, Miss., May 18-July 4. Assaults on Vicksburg May 19 and 22. Advance on Jackson, Miss., July 5–10. Siege of Jackson July 10–17. Ordered to New Orleans, La., August 6, then to Carrollton, and duty there until October. Western Louisiana Campaign October 3-November 30. Bayou Cortableaux October 21. Carrion Crow Bayou November 3. At New Iberia until December 17. Moved to New Orleans, then to Madisonville January 7, 1864. Red River Campaign May 2–20. Moved to Alexandria, La., May 2. Attached to Army of the West and Department of the Missouri. Retreat to Morganza May 13–20. Expedition from Morganza to the Atchafalaya River May 30-June 6. Moved to Carrollton June. Duty there and in the defenses of New Orleans until April 1865. Ordered from Greenville, La., to Mobile, Ala., April 19. Duty there and in Department of Alabama until August.

== Commanders ==
- Captain George W. Schofield

== See also ==
- Missouri Civil War Union units
- Missouri in the Civil War
