= 4th Ohio Independent Light Artillery Battery =

4th Ohio Battery
- Active: August 17, 1861, to March 19, 1865
- Country: United States
- Allegiance: Union
- Branch: Artillery
- Engagements: Battle of Pea Ridge; Yazoo Pass Expedition; Battle of Chickasaw Bayou; Battle of Arkansas Post; Battle of Jackson; Siege of Vicksburg, May 19 & May 22 assaults Jackson Expedition; Battle of Lookout Mountain; Battle of Missionary Ridge; Atlanta campaign Battle of Dallas; Battle of New Hope Church; Battle of Allatoona; Battle of Kennesaw Mountain; Battle of Atlanta; Siege of Atlanta

4th Ohio Battery was an artillery battery that served in the Union Army during the American Civil War.

== Service ==
The 4th Ohio Battery was organized in Cincinnati, Ohio and mustered in for three years service on August 17, 1861, under Captain Louis Hoffman.

The battery was attached to Army of the West and Department of the Missouri to February 1862. 1st Division, Army of Southwest Missouri to May 1862. Artillery, 3rd Division, Army of Southwest Missouri to July 1862. District of Eastern Arkansas, Department of the Missouri, to November 1862. 2nd Brigade, 11th Division, Right Wing, XIII Corps, Department of the Tennessee, to December 1862. 2nd Brigade, 4th Division, Sherman's Yazoo Expedition, to January 1863. Artillery, 1st Division, XV Corps, Army of the Tennessee, August 1864.

The 4th Ohio Battery ceased to exist on March 19, 1865, when its veterans and recruits were transferred to the 10th Ohio Battery.

== Detailed service ==
- Moved to St. Louis, Mo., August 21, 1861, then to Jefferson City and to Sedalia, Mo., September 30.
- Fremont's Campaign against Springfield, Mo., October 13–27.
- Duty at Springfield until November 8.
- Moved to Rolla, Mo., November 8, and duty there until February 1862.
- Curtis' advance on Springfield, Mo., February 2–13. campaign against Price in Missouri and Arkansas, February and March. Battles of Pea Ridge March 6–8.
- March to Batesville, Ark., April 5-May 8, and to Helena, Ark., May 25-July 14.
- Duty there until October. Expedition up Yazoo August 16–27.
- Capture of Steamer Fair Play August 17. Milliken's Bend August 18. Haines Bluff August 21. Bolivar Landing August 22. Greenville August 23.
- Ordered to St. Genevieve, Mo., October 7, then to Pilot Knob, Mo., and duty there until November 11. Moved to St. Genevieve, then to Camp Steele, and duty there until December 22. Sherman's Yazoo Expedition December 22, 1862, to January 3, 1863. Chickasaw Bayou December 26–28. Chickasaw Bluff December 29.
- Expedition to Arkansas Post, Ark., January 3–10, 1863.
- Assault and capture of Fort Hindman, Arkansas Post, January 10–11.
- Moved to Young's Point, La., January 17–23.
- Duty at Perkins' Plantation and Ballard's Farm until April 2.
- Expedition to Greenville, Black Bayou, and Deer Creek April 2–14.
- Demonstrations on Haines and Snyder's Bluff April 26-May 2.
- Movement to join the army in rear of Vicksburg, Miss., via Richmond and Grand Gulf May 2–14. Battle of Jackson, Miss., May 14.
- Siege of Vicksburg May 18-July 4. Assaults on Vicksburg May 19 and 22.
- Expedition to Greenville June 25-July 1. Gaines' Landing June 28.
- Surrender of Vicksburg July 4. Advance on Jackson, Miss., July 5–10.
- Siege of Jackson July 10–17. Duty at Big Black until September.
- Moved to Memphis, Tenn., then march to Chattanooga, Tenn., September 22-November 21.
- Operations on Memphis & Charleston Railroad in Alabama October 20–29. Cherokee Station October 21. Cane Creek October 26. Bear Creek (Tuscumbia) October 27. Chattanooga-Ringgold Campaign November 23–27. Battle of Lookout Mountain November 23–24. Missionary Ridge November 25. At Larkinsville and Woodville, Ala., until May 1864. Atlanta Campaign May 1 to August 14. Demonstrations on Resaca May 8–13. Near Resaca May 13.
- Battle of Resaca May 14–15. Advance on Dallas May 18–25.
- Operations on line of Pumpkin Vine Creek and battles about Dallas, New Hope Church, and Allatoona Hills May 25-June 5.
- Operations about Marietta and against Kennesaw Mountain June 10-July 2.
- Assault on Kennesaw June 27. Nickajack Creek July 2–5. Chattahoochie River July 5–17.
- Battle of Atlanta July 22. Siege of Atlanta July 22-August 14. Ezra Chapel, Hood's 2nd sortie, July 28.
- Ordered to rear August 14, and non-veterans mustered out August 29, 1864.
- Veterans and Recruits attached to Artillery Reserve, Nashville, Tenn., and attached to 10th Ohio Battery until March 1865, then transferred to 10th Ohio Battery March 19, 1865.

== Casualties ==
The battery lost a total of 34 men during service; 1 officer and 5 enlisted men killed or mortally wounded, 27 enlisted men died of disease.

== Commanders ==
- Captain Louis Hoffman
- Captain George Froehlich

== See also ==
- List of Ohio Civil War units
- Ohio in the Civil War
