= Battery L, 1st Missouri Light Artillery Regiment =

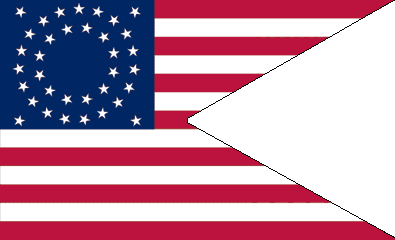
- Battery L, 1st Missouri Light Artillery flag
- Active: 25 July 1862 – 20 July 1865
- Country: United States
- Allegiance: (United States) Union; Missouri
- Branch: Union Army
- Type: Artillery
- Size: Artillery Battery
- Nicknames: Battery A, Schofield's Light Artillery
- Engagements: American Civil War; Battle of Prairie Grove (1862); Battle of Van Buren (1862)

Commanders
- Notable commanders: Frank Backof

Battery L, 1st Missouri Light Artillery Regiment was an artillery battery unit from Missouri that served in the Union Army during the American Civil War. The original Battery L was formed 1 September 1861 but was disbanded in January 1862. The long-term service Battery L was created in October 1862 by reassigning Battery A, Schofield's Light Artillery. Battery L fought at the battles of Prairie Grove and Van Buren in December 1862. Thereafter, the battery performed guard duty at different locations in Missouri, with a foray into Arkansas. The unit was mustered out on 20 July 1865.

== Short-service battery ==
1st Missouri Light Artillery Regiment was organized at St. Louis, Mo., from 1st Missouri Infantry, September 1, 1861.

== Schofield's Battery A Light Artillery ==
Organized at St. Louis, Mo., July 25, 1862. Attached to Dept. of Missouri to October, 1862. At St. Louis, Mo., until August, 1862. Ordered to Jefferson City, Mo., August 17; thence moved to Rolla, Mo., and duty there until October. Assigned to 1st Missouri Light Artillery as Battery "L," October, 1862, and for further history see that Battery.

== History ==
=== Organization ===
Original Battery on duty at St. Louis, Mo., until January, 1862, when disbanded. Battery reorganized October, 1862, by assignment of Battery "A," Schofield's Light Artillery. Attached to 1st Brigade, 3rd Division, Army of the Frontier, Dept. of Missouri, to June, 1863. District of St. Louis, Mo., Dept. Missouri, June, 1863. District of Rolla, Dept. of Missouri, to December, 1863. District of Southwest Missouri, Dept. Missouri, to January, 1864. District of Central Missouri, Dept, Missouri, to April, 1865. District North Missouri, Dept. Missouri, to July, 1865.

=== Service ===
Ordered to Join Gen. Herron October 11, 1862. March to Cassville October 11–14. Expedition to Cross Hollows, Ark., over Boston Mountains October 17–24. March to Wilson's Creek November 4–22. Forced march to relief of Gen. Blount December 3–6. Battle of Prairie Grove, Ark., December 7. Expedition over Boston Mountains to Van Buren December 27–29. At various points in Missouri until March, 1863. At Lake Springs and Rolla, Mo., until July. Moved to Houston July 14. Scout from Houston to Spring River Mills and skirmish August 6–11. Duty in District of Rolla until December, 1863, and at Springfield, Mo., District of Southwest Missouri, until January, 1864. Operations in Northwest Arkansas January 16-February 15. Duty at Springfield, Mo., until June, and at Warrensburg, Mo., until August. At Springfield until June, 1865. Ordered to St. Louis, Mo., and mustered out July 20, 1865.

== See also ==
- List of Missouri Union Civil War units
- "Flag, 1st Regiment Artillery Missouri Volunteers Battery "L," Obverse". Missouri Digital Heritage.
