= Battery M, 1st Missouri Light Artillery Regiment =

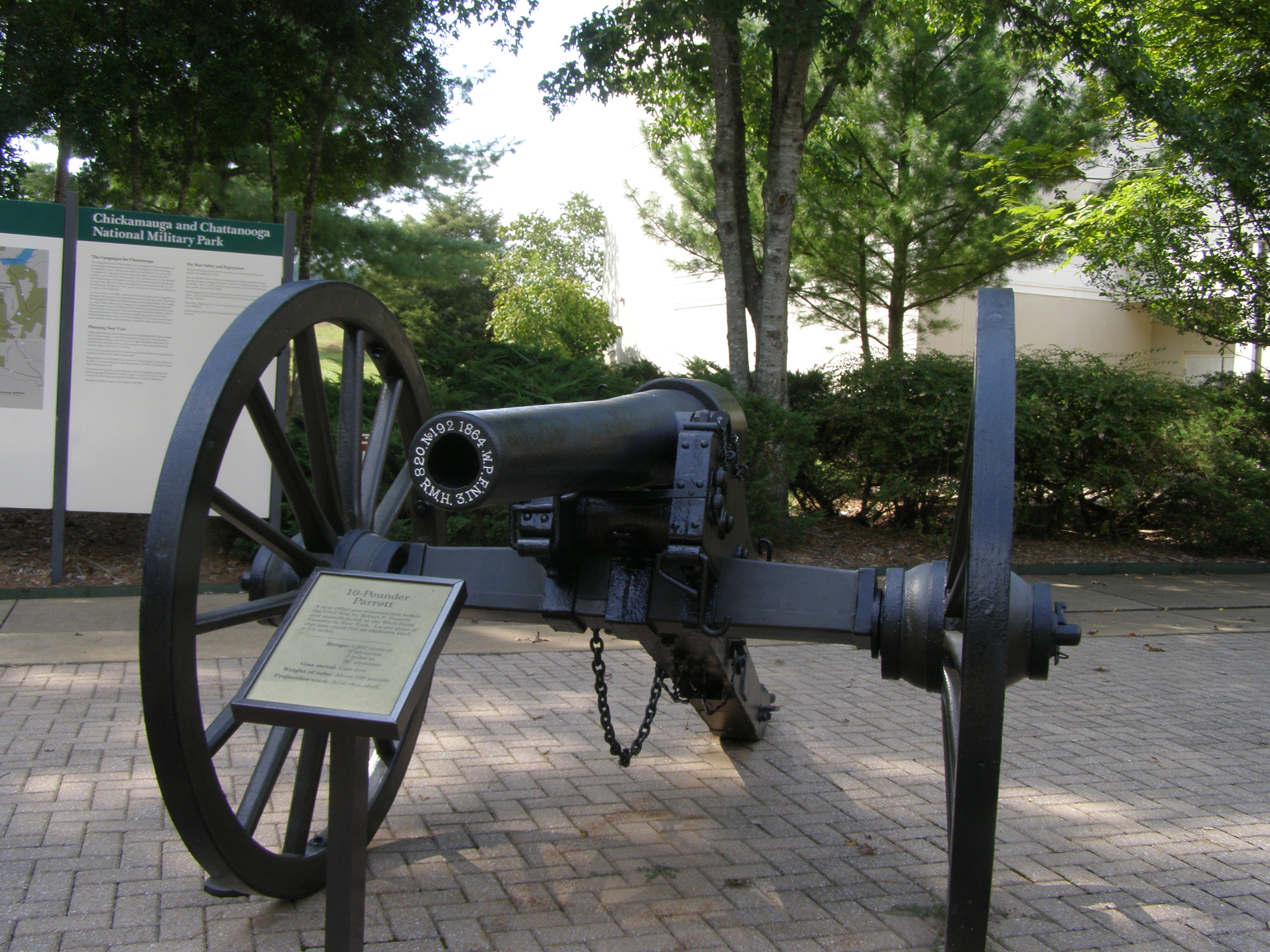
- Battery M was armed with four 10-pounder Parrott rifles. One is shown in the photo above.
- Active: 1 Sept. 1861 – 25 July 1865
- Country: United States
- Allegiance: (United States) Union; Missouri
- Branch: Union Army
- Type: Artillery
- Size: Artillery Battery
- Equipment: 4 x 10-pounder Parrott rifles
- Engagements: American Civil War; Battle of Island Number Ten (1862); Siege of Corinth (1862); Battle of Iuka (1862); Battle of Corinth (1862); Yazoo Pass Expedition (1863); Battle of Raymond (1863); Battle of Jackson (1863); Battle of Champion Hill (1863); Battle of Big Black River Bridge (1863); Siege of Vicksburg (1863); Meridian campaign (1864); Battle of Fort DeRussy (1864); Battle of Pleasant Hill (1864); Battle of Yellow Bayou (1864); Battle of Tupelo (1864)

Commanders
- Notable commanders: Junius W. MacMurray

Battery M, 1st Missouri Light Artillery Regiment was an artillery battery unit from Missouri that served in the Union Army during the American Civil War. The 1st Missouri Light Artillery Regiment was formed 1 September 1861. Battery M fought at Island Number Ten, 1st Corinth, Iuka, and 2nd Corinth in 1862. The unit participated in several battles during the Vicksburg campaign in 1863. Battery M fought at Meridian, Fort DeRussy, Pleasant Hill, Yellow Bayou, and Tupelo in 1864. After serving on garrison duty in west Tennessee, the battery mustered out on 25 July 1865.

== Organization ==
Attached to Dept. Missouri to March, 1862. Artillery, 5th Division, Army of Mississippi, to April, 1862. Artillery Division, Army Mississippi, to June, 1862. Artillery, 1st Division, Army Mississippi, to September, 1862. Artillery, 3rd Division, Army Mississippi, to November, 1862, Artillery, 7th Division, Left Wing 13th Army Corps (Old), Dept. of the Tennessee, to December, 1862. Artillery, 7th Division, 16th Army Corps, to January, 1863. Artillery, 7th Division, 17th Army Corps, to September, 1863. Artillery, 1st Division, 17th Army Corps, to March, 1864. Artillery, Provisional Division, 17th Army Corps, Dept. Gulf, to June, 1864. 4th Brigade, 1st Division, 16th Army Corps, Army Tennessee, to September, 1864. Artillery Reserve, District of West Tennessee, to July, 1865.

== History ==
SERVICE.--Fremont's Campaign against Springfield, Mo., September 27-November 2, 1861. Duty at Tipton until December and at Otterville until February 7, 1862. Moved to Jefferson City February 7–10, thence to Commerce, Mo. Operations against New Madrid, Mo., February 28-March 15. Point Pleasant March 7. Operations against Island No. 10, Mississippi River, March 15-April 8. Expedition to Fort Pillow, Tenn., April 13–17. Moved to Hamburg Landing, Tenn., April 18–22. Advance on and siege of Corinth, Miss., April 29-May 30. Reconnaissance before Farmington May 13. Tuscumbia Creek May 31-June 1. Osborn's Creek June 4. Expedition to Rienzi June 30-July 1. At Camp Clear Creek until August. March to Tuscumbia, Ala., August 18–22. March to Iuka, Miss., September 8–12. Action near Iuka September 13–14. Battle of Iuka September 19. Battle of Corinth October 3–4. Pursuit to Ripley October 5–12. Tuscumbia River October 5. Chewalla and Big Hill near Ruckersville and Ripley October 7. Grant's Central Mississippi Campaign November 2, 1862 – January 10, 1863. Duty at Memphis until March, 1863. Moved to Helena, Ark., March 1–3. Yazoo Pass Expedition and operations against Fort Pemberton and Greenwood March 13-April 5. Moved to Lake Providence, La., April 17–20. Movement on Bruinsburg and turning Grand Gulf April 25–30. Battle of Port Gibson, Miss., May 1 (Reserve). Big Black River May 3. Raymond May 12. Jackson May 14. Champion's Hill May 16. Big Black River Crossing May 17. Siege of Vicksburg May 18-July 4. Assaults on Vicksburg May 19 and 22. Duty at Vicksburg until February, 1864. Meridian Campaign February 3-March 2. Baker's Creek February 5. Red River Campaign March 10-May 22. Fort DeRussy March 14. Pleasant Hill Landing April 2. Battle of Pleasant Hill April 9. Pleasant Hill Landing April 13. About Cloutiersville April 22–23. Alexandria May 2–9. Well's and Boyce's Plantations May 6. Bayou Boeuf May 7. Yellow Bayou May 10. Retreat to Morganza May 13–20. Mansura May 16. Bayou de Glaze May 18. Moved to Vicksburg, Miss., thence to Memphis, Tenn., May 20-June 10. Smith's Expedition to Tupelo, Miss., July 5–21. Tupelo July 14–15. Old Town Creek July 15. Smith's Expedition to Oxford, Miss., August 1–30. Duty at Memphis and in District of West Tennessee until July, 1865. Mustered out July 25, 1865.

== See also ==
- List of Missouri Union Civil War units
