= M1844 32-pounder howitzer =

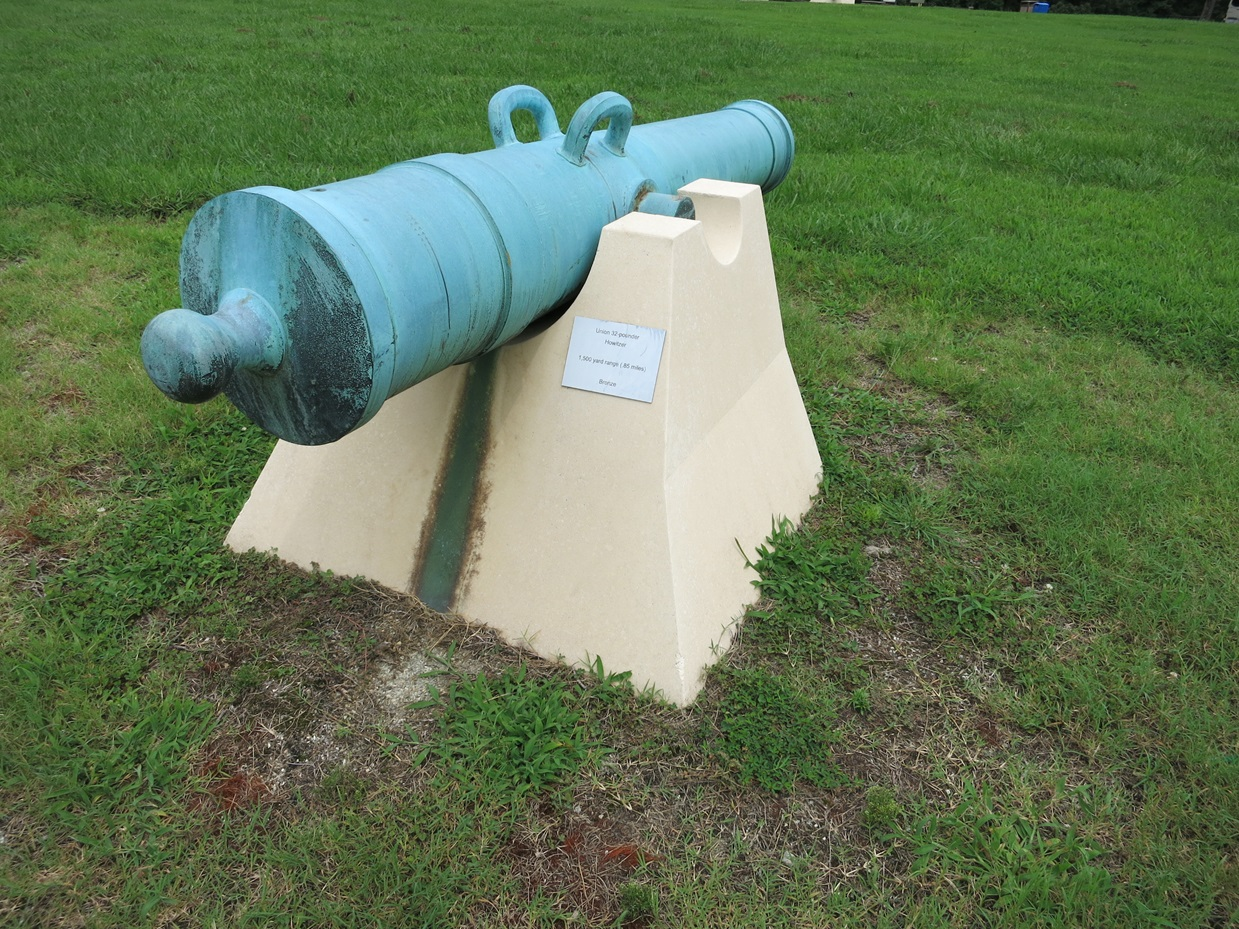
- M1844 32-pounder howitzer is located at Petersburg National Battlefield visitor center.
- Type: Howitzer
- Place of origin: United States

Service history
- In service: 1848–1865
- Used by: United States
- Wars: American Civil War

Production history
- Manufacturer: Cyrus Alger & Co. N. P. Ames
- Produced: 1848–1857
- No. built: 25

Specifications
- Mass: 1,920 lb (870.9 kg)
- Length: 82.0 in (2.08 m)
- Crew: 9
- Shell weight: 25.6 lb (11.6 kg) shell 2.5 lb (1.1 kg) charge
- Caliber: 6.4 in (163 mm)
- Barrels: 1
- Action: Muzzle loading
- Carriage: 1,175 lb (533.0 kg)
- Effective firing range: 1,504 yd (1,375 m)

The M1844 32-pounder howitzer was a bronze smoothbore artillery piece adopted by the United States Army in 1844 and employed during the American Civil War. The muzzleloader fired a 25.6 lb (11.6 kg) common shell to a distance of 1,504 yd (1,375 m) at 5° elevation. It also fired canister shot and spherical case shot. The howitzer was originally designed to be used in a mixed battery with 12-pounder field guns. However, at the time of the American Civil War, the howitzer was replaced by the M1857 12-pounder Napoleon, which combined the functions of both field gun and howitzer. Only a few 32-pounder howitzers were produced, and they were used sparingly as field artillery in the American Civil War because of the weapon's great weight.

== Background ==
In 1800, armed forces used field guns for direct artillery fire and mortars for high-angle fire. The howitzer was intermediate between the field gun and mortar in that it fired an explosive shell on a curved trajectory against enemy soldiers or fortifications. A howitzer needed a smaller explosive charge than a field gun in order to lob a projectile of similar weight. Howitzers were sometimes named after the size of the bore (or caliber), for example the 6-inch howitzer. By British and American convention, some howitzers were named after the field gun which had the same bore size. In the US Army, the weapon was called the 32-pounder howitzer since it had the same bore size as the 32-pounder gun, which was 6.4 in (163 mm) in diameter. Since a smaller charge was needed to fire a projectile, the 32-pounder howitzer had a smaller chamber near the breech only 4.62 in (117 mm) in diameter.

Bronze artillery pieces were made from copper and tin. Because the United States had few copper and no known tin deposits, in 1800 Secretary of War Henry Dearborn recommended that all cannons be cast from iron. However, casting guns from iron was unsuccessful, so the Ordnance Board of 1831 under Alexander Macomb determined that field artillery pieces should be manufactured from bronze. The 1834 regulations required that field guns be made in 6-, 9-, and 12-pounder calibers and howitzers in 12- and 24-pounder calibers. The 9-pounder was later suppressed. The M1841 6-pounder field gun produced by Cyrus Alger and Company and Ames Manufacturing Company was a success and both firms continued making bronze artillery pieces for the U.S. government until the Civil War. Before the Civil War, light field batteries were organized to consist of four 6-pounder field guns and two M1841 12-pounder howitzers while heavy field batteries included four 12-pounder field guns and two M1841 24-pounder howitzers. The 32-pounder howitzer was conceived as a way to hurl the heaviest possible projectile while still being classed as field artillery. It was designed to replace the 24-pounder howitzer in some field batteries.

== Production ==
The 32-pounder howitzer was authorized in 1843 as a so-called shell gun. A shell gun was a cannon that could fire a projectile that would penetrate a ship's hull before exploding. In fact, the howitzer was not a true shell gun because it lacked the power and the penetration to do this. The howitzer's true function was to outrange other field howitzers and utilize the maximum size of projectile. Between 1848 and 1857, Cyrus Alger manufactured 11 32-pounder howitzers while N. P. Ames produced 14 between 1851 and 1855. There are 9 known survivors out of a total of 25 produced.

== Specifications ==
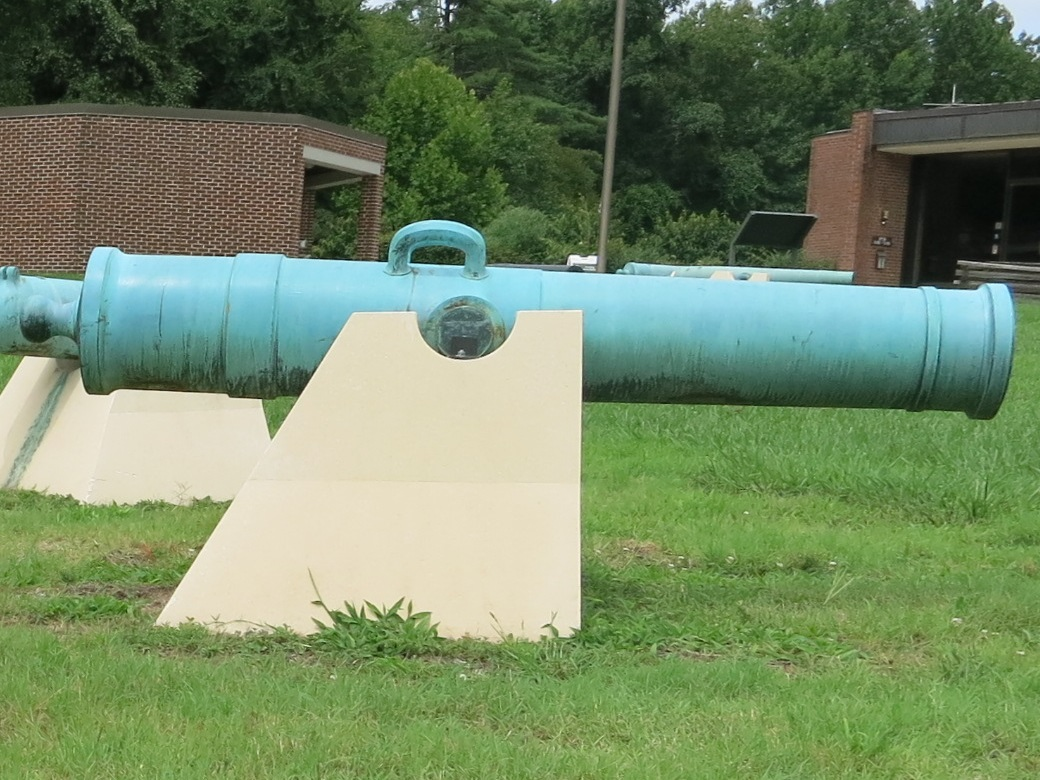
M1844 32-pounder howitzer is shown at Petersburg National Battlefield visitor center.

The Model 1844 bronze 32-pounder howitzer gun barrel was 75 in (190.5 cm) from the base ring to the muzzle. The length of the bore was 71 in (180.3 cm) and the overall length of the barrel from the end of the cascable (knob) to the muzzle was 82 in (208.3 cm). The diameter of the firing chamber was 4.62 in (117 mm). The barrel weighed 1,920 lb (871 kg) and the diameter of the bore (caliber) was 6.4 in (163 mm). The carriage weighed 1,175 lb (533 kg) and the total weight of gun and carriage was 3,095 lb (1,404 kg). Almost all artillery pieces of the Civil War era were muzzleloaders. The very few breechloading guns available were complex and difficult to use.

The howitzer could fire common shell, spherical case shot (shrapnel), or canister shot. It could not use solid shot. At 5° elevation, the gun could throw a 25.6 lb (11.6 kg) common shell a distance of 1,504 yd (1,375 m) with the standard propellant charge of 2.5 lb (1.1 kg). At 3°45' elevation, the gun could throw spherical case shot a distance of 1,200 yd (1,097 m) with a propellant charge of 3.25 lb (1.5 kg). The spherical case shot weighed 32.7 lb (14.8 kg). The canister shot weighed 28.5 lb (12.9 kg) and contained 48 iron balls from 1.46 to 1.49 in (37 to 38 mm) in diameter.

The Union Army standardized a strength of 6 guns per battery. Each gun was pulled by a limber containing an ammunition chest. Two caissons each with three additional ammunition chests were assigned to every gun. A battery wagon and a traveling forge were attached to each battery. Therefore, a typical six-gun battery had 20 six-horse teams to pull 6 gun limbers, 12 caissons, 1 wagon, and 1 forge, plus 10 extra horses. However, the heavy 32-pounder howitzers required 8-horse teams for each gun rather than the usual 6-horse teams. Each gun was served by a sergeant, two corporals, and six privates. Six privates drove the limber and caissons. Two guns formed a section, commanded by a lieutenant and the battery was led by a captain. When a battery's guns were unlimbered, they were placed at regulation 14 yd (12.8 m) intervals, with limbers and caissons to the rear. A six-gun battery occupied a width of 82 yd (75 m) and a depth of 47 yd (43 m).

== History ==
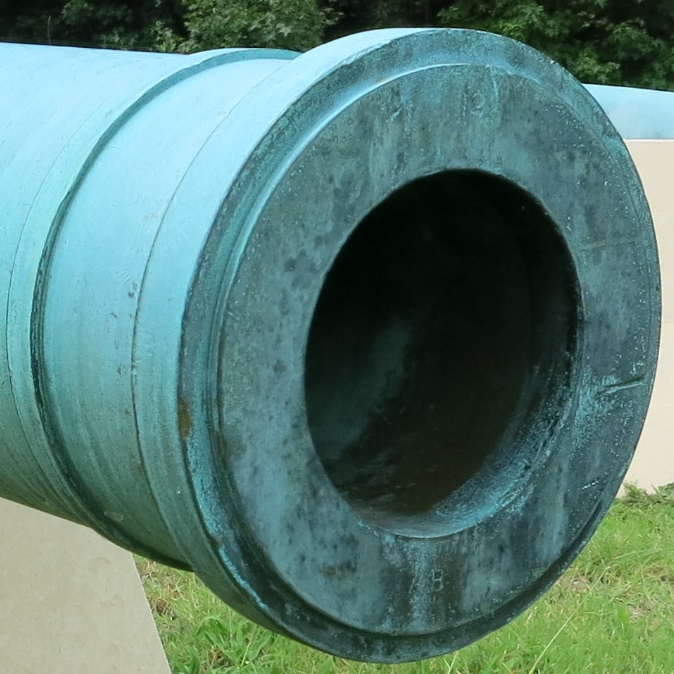
Muzzle is shown of M1844 32-pounder howitzer at Petersburg National Battlefield visitor center. The Ames registry number 12 can barely be seen at the top.

The 32-pounder howitzer, Ames Company registry number 12, served with the 5th U.S. Artillery, Battery H at the Battle of Shiloh on 7 April 1862, the Battle of Stones River on 31 December 1862, and the Battle of Chickamauga on 19–20 September 1863. It is rare to know the service record of an individual artillery piece. During the Battle of Malvern Hill on 1 July 1862, Brigadier General Fitz John Porter reported that Captain Charles Kusserow's battery of 32-pounder howitzers was engaged. Porter believed that Confederate reports of being fired on by the Union gunboats were mistaken, and that the explosions were really rounds from Kusserow's howitzers and some 4.5-inch siege rifles. One of Kusserow's gunners wrote to a friend that he was sickened to see their shells "cut roads through them some places ten feet wide ... they would close up and come ahead". Kusserow's Battery A, 1st Battalion, New York Light Artillery was present at the Battle of Antietam on 17 September 1862, during which it was armed with six 32-pounder howitzers. The battery was rearmed with 3-inch Ordnance rifles soon after the battle.

Union Brigadier General Henry Larcom Abbot wrote, "For defending positions against assault ... no artillery can be more efficient than the 32-pdr. or 24-pdr. field howitzer. The former ... throws very large case shot and canister and from its light weight may be kept out of sight and danger until the assault is delivered when it can suddenly be run into battery and served with murderous effect." Abbot then described an attack by the 22nd South Carolina Infantry Regiment on the Dutton redoubt located near Bermuda Hundred. The position was defended by Company L, 1st Connecticut Heavy Artillery Regiment with one 24-pounder howitzer and two 32-pounder howitzers. On 2 June 1864, the Confederate attack on the redoubt was repulsed. The Union soldiers counted 17 Confederates killed, including Colonel Olin M. Dantzler. A lieutenant and 22 enlisted men surrendered rather than try to retreat under fire from the redoubt.

== Civil War artillery ==
Characteristics of common American Civil War artillery pieces
| Description | Caliber | Tube length | Tube weight | Carriage weight | Shot weight | Charge weight | Range 5° elev. |
|---|---|---|---|---|---|---|---|
| M1841 6-pounder cannon | 3.67 in (9.3 cm) | 60 in (152.4 cm) | 884 lb (401 kg) | 900 lb (408 kg) | 6.1 lb (2.8 kg) | 1.25 lb (0.6 kg) | 1,523 yd (1,393 m) |
| M1841 12-pounder cannon | 4.62 in (11.7 cm) | 78 in (198.1 cm) | 1,757 lb (797 kg) | 1,175 lb (533 kg) | 12.3 lb (5.6 kg) | 2.5 lb (1.1 kg) | 1,663 yd (1,521 m) |
| M1841 12-pounder howitzer | 4.62 in (11.7 cm) | 53 in (134.6 cm) | 788 lb (357 kg) | 900 lb (408 kg) | 8.9 lb (4.0 kg) | 1.0 lb (0.5 kg) | 1,072 yd (980 m) |
| M1841 24-pounder howitzer | 5.82 in (14.8 cm) | 65 in (165.1 cm) | 1,318 lb (598 kg) | 1,128 lb (512 kg) | 18.4 lb (8.3 kg) | 2.0 lb (0.9 kg) | 1,322 yd (1,209 m) |
| M1844 32-pounder howitzer | 6.40 in (16.3 cm) | 75 in (190.5 cm) | 1,920 lb (871 kg) | 1,175 lb (533 kg) | 25.6 lb (11.6 kg) | 2.5 lb (1.1 kg) | 1,504 yd (1,375 m) |
| M1857 12-pounder Napoleon | 4.62 in (11.7 cm) | 66 in (167.6 cm) | 1,227 lb (557 kg) | 1,128 lb (512 kg) | 12.3 lb (5.6 kg) | 2.5 lb (1.1 kg) | 1,619 yd (1,480 m) |
| 12-pounder James rifle | 3.67 in (9.3 cm) | 60 in (152.4 cm) | 875 lb (397 kg) | 900 lb (408 kg) | 12 lb (5.4 kg) | 0.75 lb (0.3 kg) | 1,700 yd (1,554 m) |
| 3-inch Ordnance rifle | 3.0 in (7.6 cm) | 69 in (175.3 cm) | 820 lb (372 kg) | 900 lb (408 kg) | 9.5 lb (4.3 kg) | 1.0 lb (0.5 kg) | 1,830 yd (1,673 m) |
| 10-pounder Parrott rifle | 3.0 in (7.6 cm) | 74 in (188.0 cm) | 899 lb (408 kg) | 900 lb (408 kg) | 9.5 lb (4.3 kg) | 1.0 lb (0.5 kg) | 1,900 yd (1,737 m) |
| 20-pounder Parrott rifle | 3.67 in (9.3 cm) | 84 in (213.4 cm) | 1,750 lb (794 kg) | 1,175 lb (533 kg) | 20 lb (9.1 kg) | 2.0 lb (0.9 kg) | 1,900 yd (1,737 m) |
