= Madison Louisiana Light Artillery =

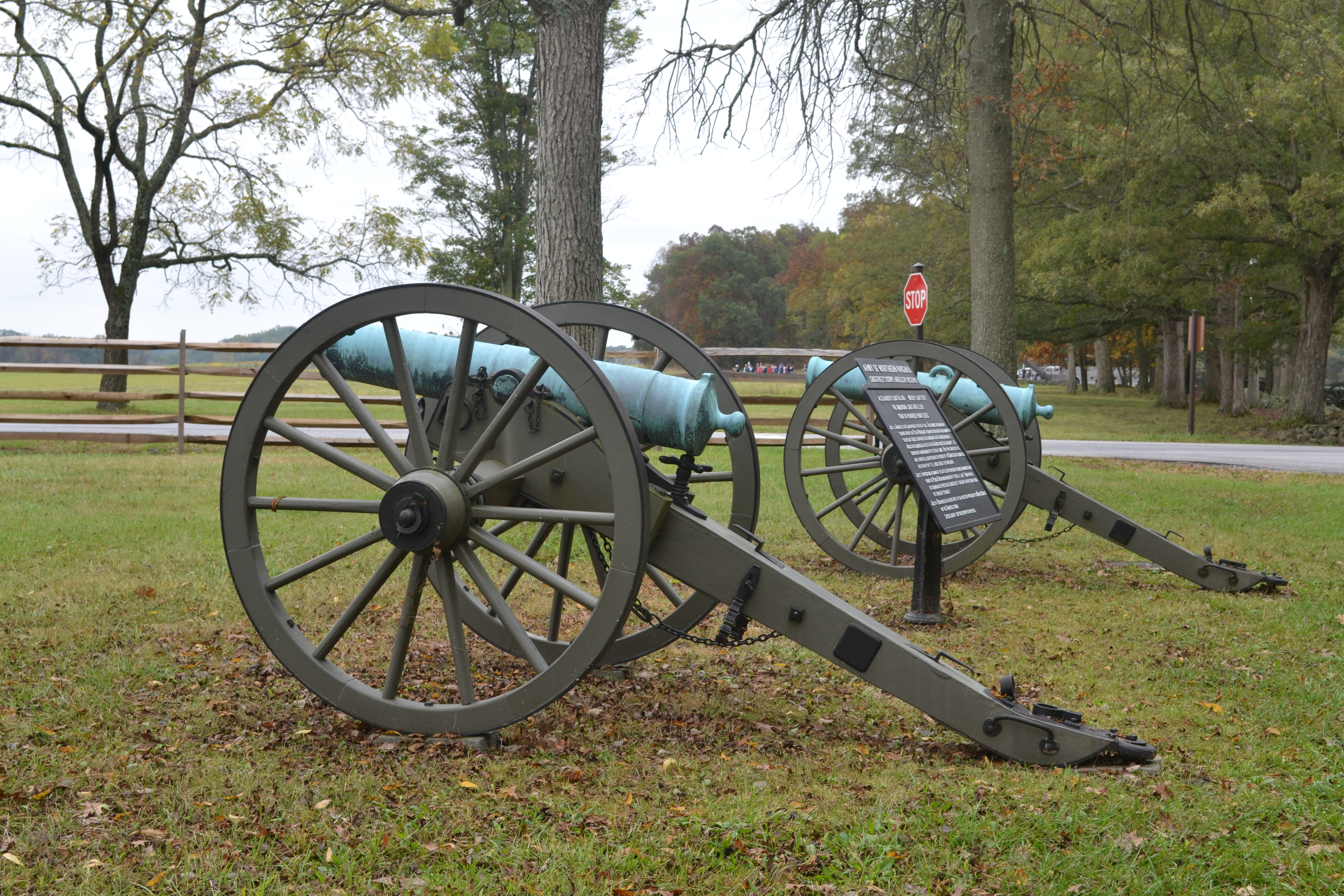
- Two 24-pounder howitzers mark the location of the Madison Light Artillery at Gettysburg National Military Park. (Note: The two guns appear to be Austrian-made howitzers, rather than the US-made M1841 24-pounder howitzer.)
- Active: 23 May 1861 – 9 April 1865
- Country: Confederate States of America
- Allegiance: Confederate States of America; Louisiana
- Branch: Confederate States Army
- Type: Artillery
- Size: Company
- Nicknames: Moody's Battery, Madison Tips
- Equipment: 2 x M1841 24-pounder howitzers, 2 x 3-inch Ordnance rifles (Sept. 1862)
- Engagements: American Civil War; Battle of Garnett's & Golding's Farm (1862); Battle of Savage's Station (1862); Northern Virginia campaign (1862); Battle of Antietam (1862); Battle of Fredericksburg (1862); Battle of Chancellorsville (1863); Battle of Gettysburg (1863); Knoxville campaign (1863); Overland Campaign (1864); Siege of Petersburg (1864–65); Battle of Appomattox (1865)

Commanders
- Notable commanders: George V. Moody

The Madison Louisiana Light Artillery was a Louisiana artillery unit that fought in the Confederate States Army during the American Civil War. Formed as an infantry company, it arrived in the Eastern Theater in May 1861 and was converted to an artillery battery in August. The unit was armed with six guns in 1861, but by September 1862, it had only four guns. It served at Garnett's and Golding's Farm, Savage's Station, Second Bull Run, Antietam, and Fredericksburg in 1862. The battery fought at Chancellorsville and Gettysburg and in the Knoxville campaign in 1863. The Madison Light Artillery served in the Overland Campaign and at the Siege of Petersburg in 1864. The unit surrendered at Appomattox in April 1865.

== Formation ==
The Madison Light Artillery originally formed at New Carthage, in Madison Parish, Louisiana, as an infantry company. The company traveled to Lynchburg, Virginia, where it mustered into Confederate service on 23 May 1861. The unit was converted to an artillery battery on 23 August 1861. It moved to Richmond, Virginia, in October, where the company was equipped with two M1841 12-pounder howitzers, two 3-inch Ordnance rifles, and two M1841 6-pounder field guns. George V. Moody was appointed captain in command of the battery. From Richmond, the battery moved to Manassas, Virginia. (Note: New Carthage no longer exists. It was located near present-day Afton, Louisiana. For its location, see Grant's operations against Vicksburg map at the Siege of Vicksburg article.)

== Service ==
=== 1862 ===
The first actions of the Madison Light Artillery were at the Battle of Garnett's and Golding's Farm on 27–28 June 1862 and the Battle of Fair Oaks Station on 29 June during the Seven Days Battles. The battery was assigned to Lieutenant Colonel John J. Garnett's artillery battalion in Major General John B. Magruder's command. On the evening of 27 June, Brigadier General Robert A. Toombs was ordered to probe the Union lines near James Garnett's farm. Toombs exceeded his orders by launching an attack which was beaten back. Ordered to reconnoiter the Federal lines the next morning, Toombs repeated his mistake of the previous day and was repulsed again. Between the two actions, the Confederates sustained 438 casualties while inflicting only 189 on the Federals. In the 29 June fighting, Union losses totaled 1,038 against only 473 Confederate casualties.

The Madison Light Artillery was assigned to Major General James Longstreet's wing in the Northern Virginia campaign but was not engaged. The battery is not listed in Longstreet's order of battle for the Second Battle of Bull Run on 28–30 August 1862. At the Battle of Antietam on 17 September, Moody's battery was armed with two 3-inch Ordnance rifles and two M1841 24-pounder howitzers. The battery suffered losses of 4 killed and 28 wounded at Antietam. The battery was part of Colonel Stephen D. Lee's 2nd Reserve Artillery Battalion in Longstreet's corps. During the morning's second assault by the Union I Corps, three Confederate batteries were withdrawn and replaced by Moody's battery. One section of the battery unlimbered in front of the Confederate infantry and opened a very effective fire on the Union soldiers. Moody's battery was "badly cut up" and pulled back to refit. At 2:00 pm, Union troops mounted an attack across the Middle Bridge. With the help of the refitted guns of Moody's and other batteries, this effort was defeated by 3:30 pm.

Moody's battery shelled the Union-occupied town early in the Battle of Fredericksburg on 13 December 1862. In the afternoon, two guns were sent to defend Marye's Heights in relief of the Washington Artillery. These two guns fired until they ran out of ammunition, then withdrew. At Fredericksburg, the Madison Light Artillery was assigned to Lieutenant Colonel Edward Porter Alexander's artillery battalion in Longstreet's First Corps, Army of Northern Virginia.

=== 1863–1865 ===
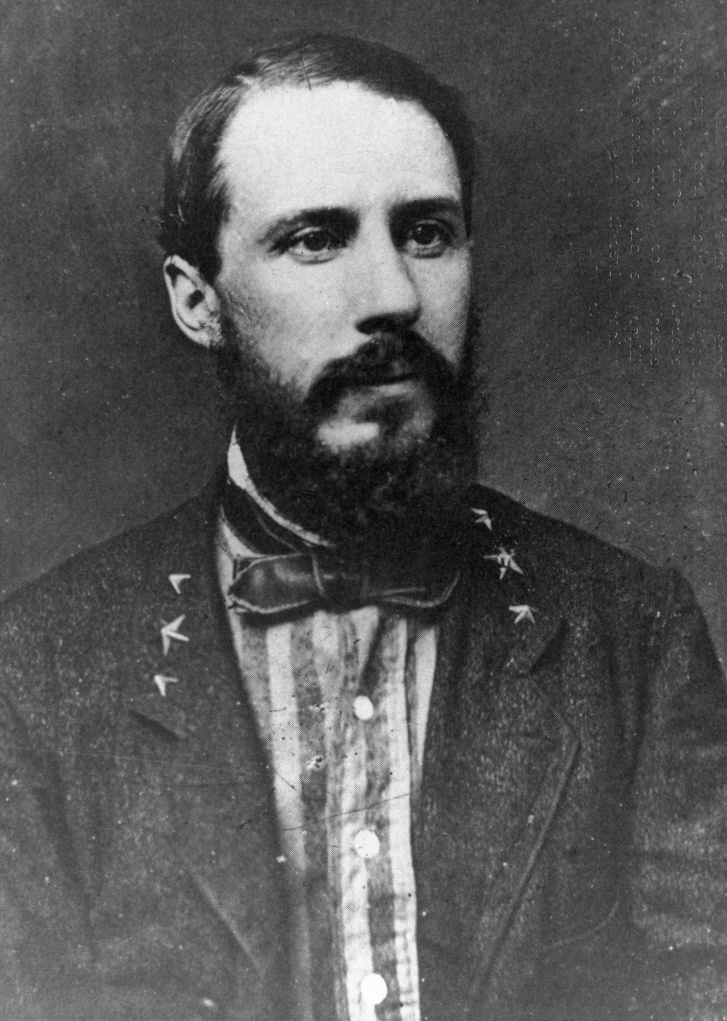
E. P. Alexander

The Madison Light Artillery was still part of Alexander's artillery battalion in the First Corps at the Battle of Chancellorsville on 1–4 May 1863. On 3 May, as soon as Union troops abandoned Hazel Grove, Alexander immediately ordered his guns to occupy the key position. First, he unlimbered 18 guns from four Virginia batteries, then he added 10 more guns from the batteries of Moody, Captain William W. Parker, and Pichegru Woolfolk Jr. The Hazel Grove position completely dominated the Federal defenses near Fairview. As the Hazel Grove batteries ran out of ammunition, Alexander replaced them with other fresh batteries. The guns were tremendously effective, their crews' only complaint being the poor quality of the Confederate-made shells. The 4th U.S. Artillery, Battery K, closest to Hazel Grove, suffered 45 casualties out of 120 gunners and lost 59 horses. In the Salem Church action of 4 May, Alexander's battalion took position in the center near Hazel Run.

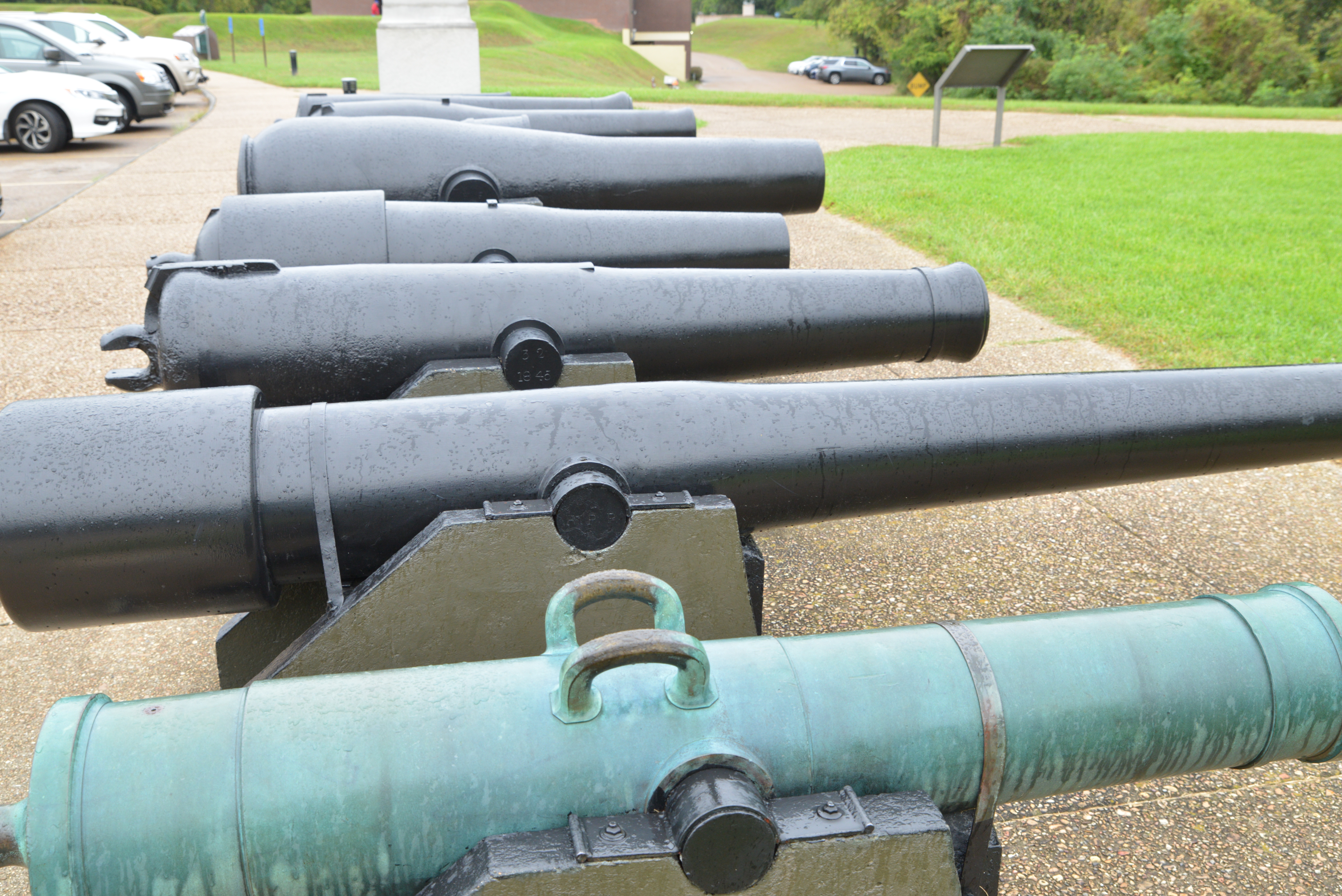
The gun barrel in the foreground with the twin handles is the U.S. Model 1841 24-pounder howitzer which was used by the Madison Light artillery starting in 1862.

At the Battle of Gettysburg on 1–3 July 1863, the Madison Light Artillery was armed with four 24-pounder howitzers. These weapons had a relatively short range of 1,322 yd (1,209 m) at 5° elevation compared with the 1,619 yd (1,480 m) range at 5° elevation of the popular M1857 12-pounder Napoleon. The howitzer was also 91 lb (41 kg) heavier than the Napoleon. However, some Confederate gunners appreciated the 24-pounder's accuracy and hitting power. At Gettysburg, Moody's battery took 135 men into action and suffered 33 casualties. The battery was assigned to Longstreet's First Corps. Author Noah Andre Trudeau's artillery map showed Moody's battery posted in the Peach Orchard for the 3 July bombardment.

When Longstreet's corps transferred to the Western Theater in September 1863, the Madison Light Artillery traveled with it. However, Moody's battery arrived too late to fight at the Battle of Chickamauga. The unit fought with Longstreet's corps during the Knoxville campaign from 4 November to 23 December. The battery was assigned to an artillery battalion led by Major Frank Huger. The Battle of Campbell's Station on 16 November saw a prolonged artillery duel between noon and 3 pm. During the 18 November action that preceded the Siege of Knoxville, Moody's guns fired on dismounted Union cavalry at a range of 800 yd (732 m). When Moody's battery opened fire, it was the signal for two masked 12-pounder Napoleons from Captain Osmond B. Taylor's Virginia battery to begin blasting the Union breastworks. When Longstreet abandoned the siege on 4 December, Alexander ordered Moody's battery to keep firing until nightfall before limbering up and leaving the area. Moody himself was too sick to move and was left behind in a field hospital to be taken prisoner. Longstreet's command remained in East Tennessee until 11 April when it began traveling by rail to Gordonsville, Virginia.

Moody was returned in a prisoner exchange, but he was captured a second time and spent the rest of the war as a prisoner of war at Camp Chase. (Note: Downey noted that Camp Chase was near Chicago, but it was near Columbus, Ohio. The date and circumstance of Moody's second capture was not stated (Downey 2022).) For the Overland Campaign, the Madison Light Artillery was assigned to Huger's battalion in the First Corps. Brigadier General William N. Pendleton reported that Moody's battery had five guns at this time, but he did not mention the type of guns employed. Huger's battalion missed the Battle of the Wilderness because it was held back until 8 May 1864. On 12 May at the Battle of Spotsylvania, Moody's battery was led by First Lieutenant Dent Burroughs who was killed by a shot that penetrated the parapet.

The Madison Light Artillery remained in Huger's battalion in First Corps for the rest of the war. At the Siege of Petersburg, the battery was commanded by Lieutenant J. C. Parkinson, and at the Appomattox surrender the battery was led by Lieutenant George Poindexter. On 9 April 1865, 3 officers and 41 enlisted men were paroled. (Note: The unit was referred to as Moody's battery in three orders of battle (Battles & Leaders 1987b, pp. 182, 593, 751).)

== See also ==
- List of Louisiana Confederate Civil War units
- Louisiana in the Civil War

== Notes ==
Footnotes

Citations
