= M1841 24-pounder howitzer =

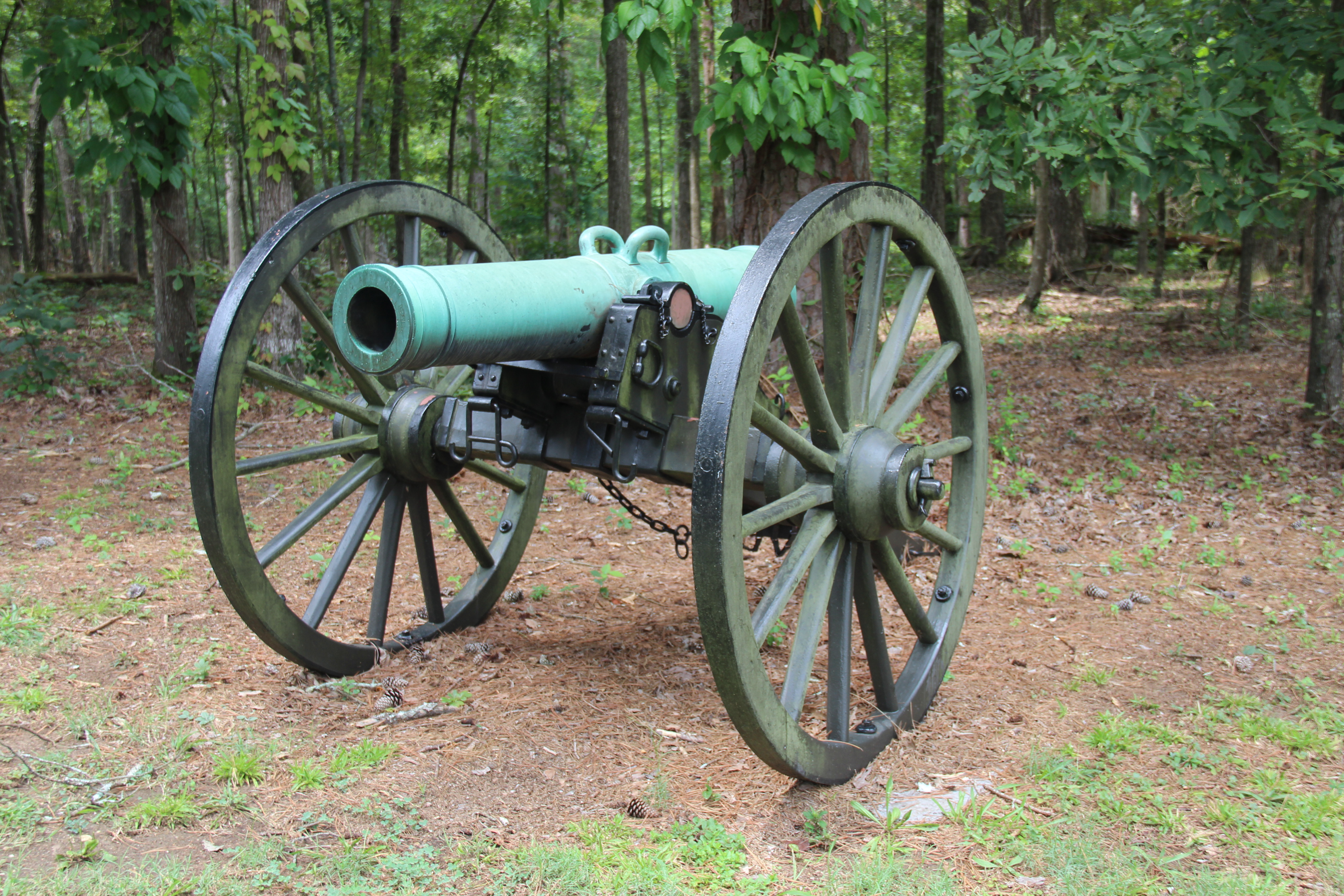
- Bronze Model 1841 24-pounder howitzer is at Chickamauga and Chattanooga National Military Park. Note the twin handles and the 5.82-inch bore.
- Type: Howitzer
- Place of origin: United States

Service history
- Used by: United States
- Wars: Mexican–American War; American Civil War

Production history
- Manufacturer: Cyrus Alger & Co. N. P. Ames
- Produced: 1841–1863
- No. built: 56 (1835), 69 (1841)

Specifications
- Mass: 1,320 lb (598.7 kg)
- Length: 65.0 in (1.65 m)
- Crew: 9
- Shell weight: 18.4 lb (8.3 kg) shell 2.0 lb (0.9 kg) charge
- Caliber: 5.82 in (148 mm)
- Barrels: 1
- Action: Muzzle loading
- Carriage: 1,128 lb (511.7 kg)
- Rate of fire: 2 rounds/minute
- Effective firing range: 1,322 yd (1,209 m)

The M1841 24-pounder howitzer was a smoothbore muzzle-loading artillery piece adopted by the United States Army in 1841 and employed from the Mexican–American War through to the American Civil War. The bronze howitzer fired a 18.4 lb (8.3 kg) common shell, as well as canister shot and spherical case shot. The howitzer was originally designed to be employed in a mixed battery together with 12-pounder field guns. By the time of the American Civil War, the 24-pounder howitzer was outclassed by the M1857 12-pounder Napoleon, which combined the functions of both field gun and howitzer. The 24-pounder howitzer had limited use as field artillery during the conflict and production of the weapon in the Union States ended in 1863. The Confederate States of America manufactured a few 24-pounder howitzers and imported others from the Austrian Empire.

== Background ==
In 1800, armies employed field guns for direct artillery fire and mortars for high-angle fire. Intermediate between the field gun and mortar was the howitzer which fired an explosive shell on a curved trajectory against enemy personnel or fortifications. Usually, a howitzer required a smaller charge than a field gun to lob a projectile of similar weight. Larger howitzers were often named after the size of the bore (or caliber), for example the M1841 8-inch howitzer. On the other hand, by British and American convention, some howitzers were named after the field gun which had the same bore size. The weapon was called the 24-pounder howitzer since it had the same bore size as the 24-pounder gun, which was 5.82 in (148 mm) in diameter.

Copper and tin were required to produce bronze artillery pieces. Since the United States had few copper and no known tin deposits, in 1800 Secretary of War Henry Dearborn recommended that all cannons be cast from iron. Because these efforts were not successful, the Ordnance Board of 1831 under Alexander Macomb recommended that field artillery pieces be manufactured from bronze. The 1834 regulations required that field guns be made in 6-pounder, 9-pounder, and 12-pounder calibers and howitzers in 12-pounder and 24-pounder calibers. The Model 1819 24-pounder was an early attempt to produce an iron howitzer. Manufactured by the Fort Pitt Foundry, the short howitzer was 33.12 in (84.1 cm) from base ring to muzzle and had a bore 29.2 in (74.2 cm) long. Of a total of thirty-one accepted by the US Army, only one is known to have survived. Between 1834 and 1857, twenty-one cast iron 24-pounder howitzers were produced in batches of between one and six by various manufacturers, of which none have survived.

== Production ==
Gun founders Cyrus Alger & Co. and N. P. Ames produced 56 bronze Model 1835 24-pounder howitzers. The dimensions of the Model 1835 are unknown, but they are probably similar to the Model 1841. The average weight of nine of the Model 1835 howitzers was recorded as 1,320 lb (599 kg), but none are known to have survived. A total of 69 bronze Model 1841 24-pounder howitzers were manufactured by Alger and Ames of which 25 survive. Ames produced 17 of the howitzers in 1841–1847 and 10 more in 1861. Alger produced two in 1841, 10 more in 1858, and 30 in 1862–1863. The final 30 differ by having a circular cross section to the two handles; whereas the earlier versions had handles with a half-octagon cross-section. After the last 30 guns, no more guns with handles were produced for the US Army.

Two bronze 24-pounder howitzers that were produced for the Confederate States survive from the Western Foundry of Quinby and Robinson in Memphis, Tennessee. Notably, they do not have the twin handles. No other Confederate 24-pounder howitzers are known to have survived. Seven howitzers were imported from Austria. The survivors are 59 in (1.50 m) long and weigh 652 to 665 lb (296 to 302 kg). Because the larger bore of the Austrian howitzers was 5.87 in (149 mm), Confederate gunners were advised to wrap their ammunition in canvas.

== Specifications ==
The Model 1841 bronze 24-pounder howitzer barrel was 65.0 in (1.65 m) from the base ring to the muzzle and its weight was 1,320 lb (598.7 kg). The diameter of the bore (caliber) was 5.82 in (148 mm) and the bore length was 61.0 in (1.55 m). This means the bore was 10.48 calibers long. The howitzer fired a 18.4 lb (8.3 kg) common shell. At 5° elevation, the gun could throw common shell a distance of 1,322 yd (1,209 m) with the standard propellant charge of 2.0 lb (0.91 kg). The carriage weighed 1,128 lb (512 kg) and the total weight of gun and carriage was 2,446 lb (1,109 kg) (using a gun weight of 1,318 lbs). The howitzer could fire common shell, spherical case (shrapnel), or canister shot. It could not use solid shot. The rate of fire for a smoothbore field artillery piece was two aimed shots per minute. Since a smaller charge was needed to fire a projectile, the 24-pounder howitzer had a smaller chamber near the breech only 4.62 in (117 mm) in diameter.

The Union Army tried to standardize battery size at six guns. Each gun was pulled by a limber with an ammunition chest. Two caissons with additional ammunition were assigned to each gun. A battery wagon and a traveling forge were attached to each battery. Therefore, a six gun battery typically had 20 six-horse teams to pull six gun limbers, 12 caissons, wagon, and forge, plus 10 extra horses. Each gun was served by a sergeant, two corporals, and six privates. Six privates drove the limber and caissons. Two guns formed a section, commanded by a lieutenant and the battery was led by a captain. When a battery's guns were unlimbered, they were placed at regulation 14 yd (12.8 m) intervals, with limbers and caissons to the rear. A six gun battery occupied a width of 82 yd (75 m) and a depth of 47 yd (43 m).

Side view of a typical 19th-century smoothbore muzzle-loading cannon

Model 1841 Bronze 24-pounder Howitzer Specifications
Description	Dimension
Weight of the gun barrel	1,320 lb (598.7 kg)
Diameter of the bore (caliber)	5.82 in (14.78 cm)
Diameter of the chamber	4.62 in (11.73 cm)
Length of the bore including chamber	61 in (154.9 cm)
Length of the chamber	4.75 in (12.1 cm)
Length from the rear of the base ring to the face of the muzzle	65 in (165.1 cm)
Length from the rear of the knob to the face of the muzzle	71.2 in (180.8 cm)
Length from the rear of the base ring to the end of the (second) reinforce	34.5 in (87.6 cm)
Length of the chase from the end of the reinforce to the rear of the chase ring	24.7 in (62.7 cm)
Length from the rear of the chase ring to the face of the muzzle	5.8 in (14.7 cm)
Length from the rear of the base ring to the rear of the trunnions	27.5 in (69.9 cm)
Diameter of the base ring	12.0 in (30.5 cm)
Thickness of metal at the vent	3.19 in (8.1 cm)
Thickness of metal at the end of the (second) reinforce	2.29 in (5.8 cm)
Thickness of metal at the end of the chase and at the neck	1.59 in (4.0 cm)

== History ==
=== Mexican-American War ===
While a light field battery was made up of the M1841 6-pounder field gun and M1841 12-pounder howitzer, a heavy field battery was designed to be formed from four 12-pounder field guns and two 24-pounder howitzers. The US Army Model 1841 series artillery performed splendidly during the Mexican-American War, earning an excellent reputation for maneuverability and reliability. Aside from having superior guns, the American gunners had much better training. During the Battle of Monterrey on 21–24 September 1846, Zachary Taylor's army conducted an ineffectual bombardment of the Black Fort with two 24-pounder howitzers and one 10-inch mortar. During the Battle of Buena Vista on 22–23 February 1847, two 24-pounder howitzers and six companies of volunteers were left behind to garrison Saltillo.

=== Civil War ===
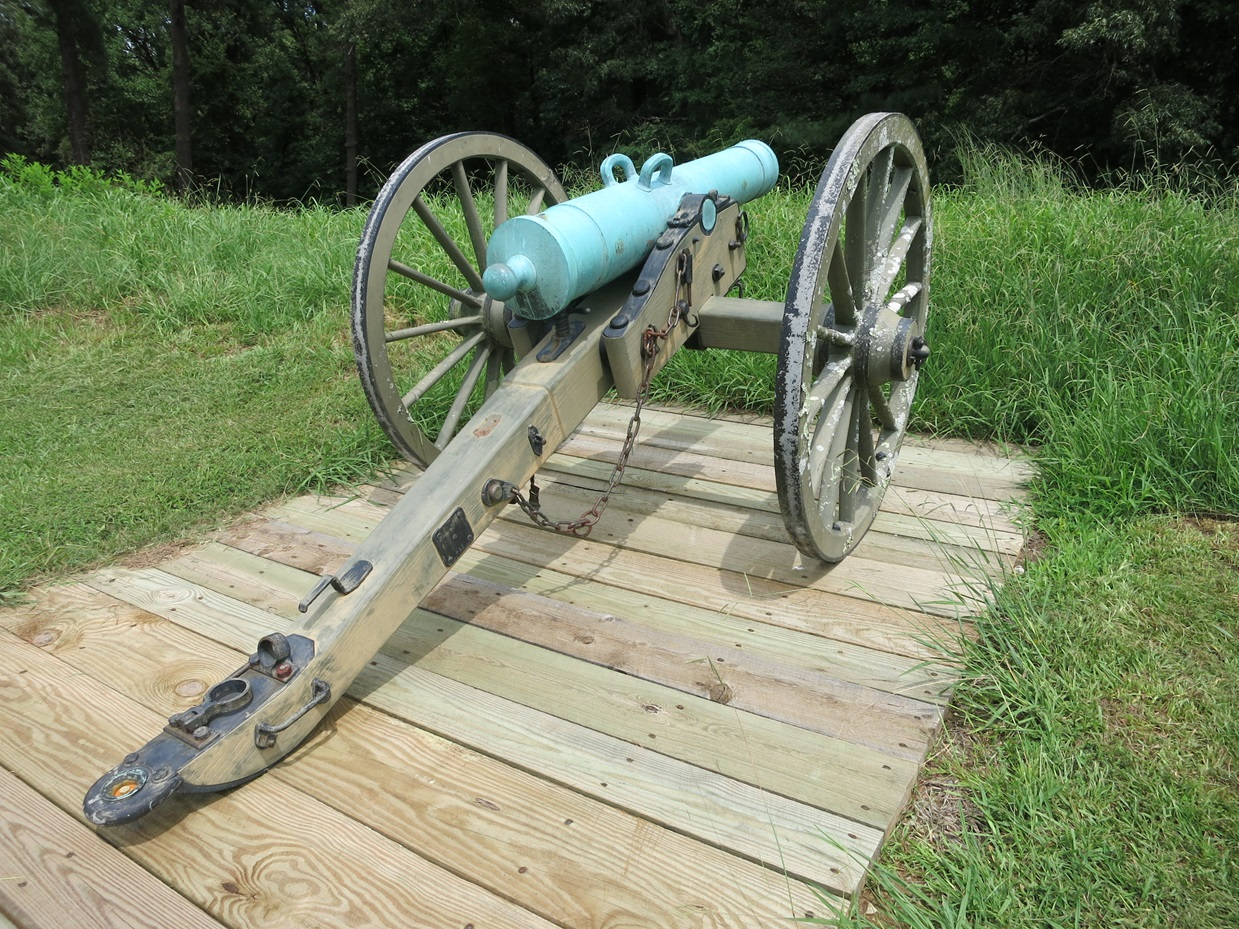
Model 1841 24-pounder howitzer at Battery 5 in Petersburg National Battlefield.

In 1853, France designed an artillery piece that combined the functions of the field gun and the howitzer. The weapon was quickly copied by the US Army and the M1857 12-pounder Napoleon gun-howitzer was the result. During the Civil War, the 24-pounder howitzer was not frequently employed by batteries of Union field artillery because it was relatively heavy and had a shorter range compared to the 12-pounder Napoleon's 1,619 yd (1,480 m) range at 5° elevation. Nevertheless, Confederates favored the 24-pounder howitzer for its hitting power and accuracy. The concept of a mixed battery of four 12-pounder field guns and two 24-pounder howitzers was not pursued by the Union Army after 1861, so it is not clear why the howitzer continued to be manufactured in 1862–1863. The last 24-pounder howitzer was produced on 26 May 1863.

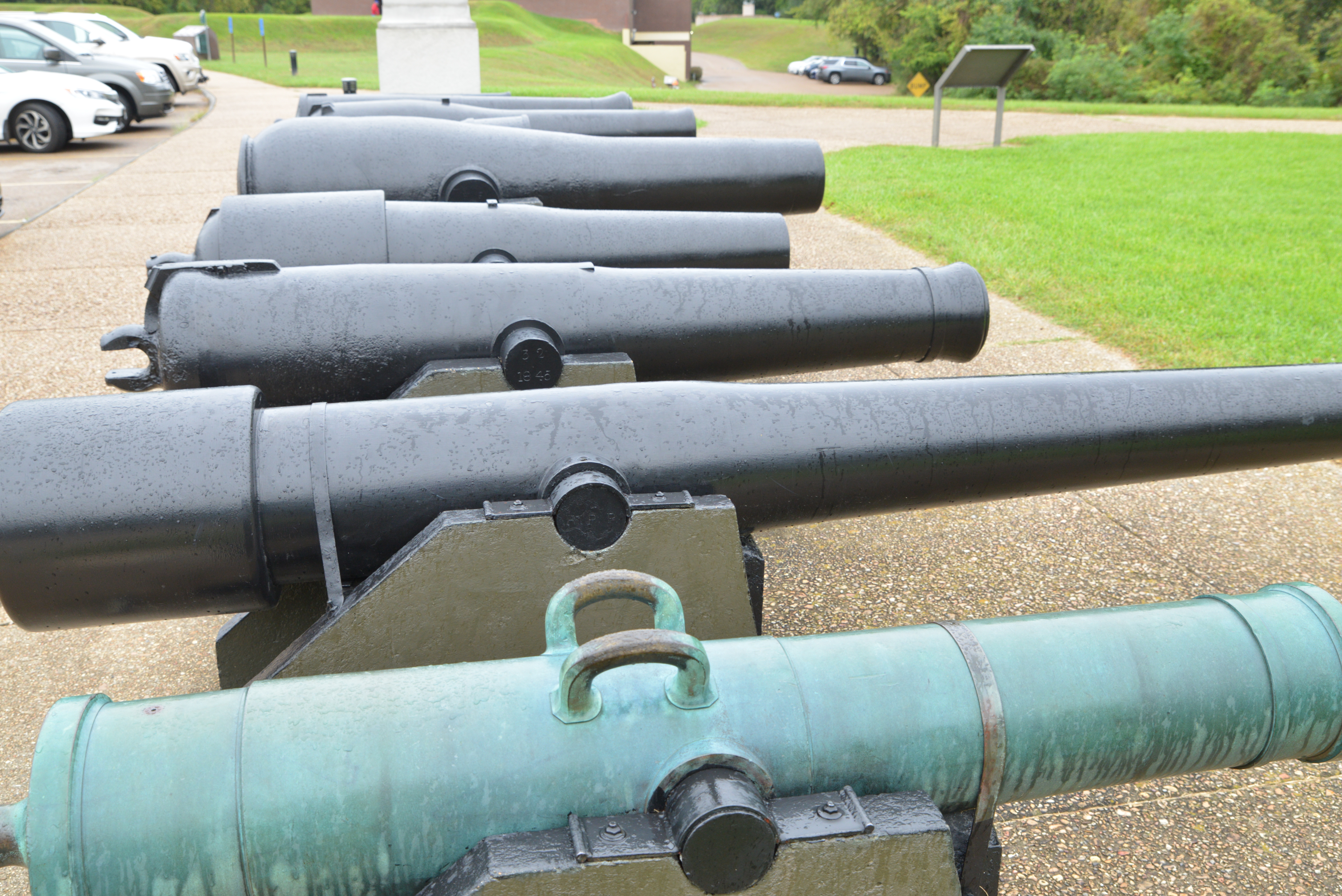
Bronze Model 1841 24-pounder howitzer at Vicksburg National Military Park is the gun in the foreground.

Edward McAllister's Battery D, 1st Illinois Light Artillery Regiment was armed with three cast iron 24-pounder howitzers at the Battle of Fort Donelson during which two of the guns were disabled. The battery was re-equipped with four bronze 24-pounder howitzers before the Battle of Shiloh in April 1862. Frederick Welker's Battery H, 1st Missouri Light Artillery Regiment was armed with two 24-pounder howitzers at the Second Battle of Corinth in October 1862. On 30 June 1863, the Union Army of the Cumberland had two 24-pounder howitzers out of 220 artillery pieces while the Army of the Ohio had four out of 72. Near Richmond, Virginia, Battery L, 1st Connecticut Heavy Artillery Regiment defended a redoubt with one 24-pounder howitzer and two M1844 32-pounder howitzers. In June 1864, the position was attacked by the 22nd South Carolina Infantry Regiment which was repulsed with 17 men killed. Another 23 men surrendered rather than trying to retreat under fire.

During the Battle of Pea Ridge in March 1862, a Confederate unit, Landis' Missouri Battery was armed with four guns, two of which were 24-pounder howitzers. At the Battle of Antietam on 17 September 1862, the Confederate Army of Northern Virginia employed four 24-pounder howitzers. Two were part of James Reilly's six gun (Rowan) North Carolina Battery and two were in George V. Moody's four gun Madison Louisiana Light Artillery. The Union Army of the Potomac employed none at Antietam, but at the Battle of Harpers Ferry, the Confederates captured 47 Federal artillery pieces, including six 24-pounder howitzers. At the Battle of Gettysburg on 1–3 July 1863, the Confederate army again utilized four 24-pounder howitzers.

== Civil War artillery ==
Characteristics of common American Civil War artillery pieces
Description	Caliber	Tube length	Tube weight	Carriage weight	Shot weight	Charge weight	Range 5° elev.
M1841 6-pounder cannon	3.67 in (9.3 cm)	60 in (152.4 cm)	884 lb (401 kg)	900 lb (408 kg)	6.1 lb (2.8 kg)	1.25 lb (0.6 kg)	1,523 yd (1,393 m)
M1841 12-pounder cannon	4.62 in (11.7 cm)	78 in (198.1 cm)	1,757 lb (797 kg)	1,175 lb (533 kg)	12.3 lb (5.6 kg)	2.5 lb (1.1 kg)	1,663 yd (1,521 m)
M1841 12-pounder howitzer	4.62 in (11.7 cm)	53 in (134.6 cm)	788 lb (357 kg)	900 lb (408 kg)	8.9 lb (4.0 kg)	1.0 lb (0.5 kg)	1,072 yd (980 m)
M1841 24-pounder howitzer	5.82 in (14.8 cm)	65 in (165.1 cm)	1,318 lb (598 kg)	1,128 lb (512 kg)	18.4 lb (8.3 kg)	2.0 lb (0.9 kg)	1,322 yd (1,209 m)
M1857 12-pounder Napoleon	4.62 in (11.7 cm)	66 in (167.6 cm)	1,227 lb (557 kg)	1,128 lb (512 kg)	12.3 lb (5.6 kg)	2.5 lb (1.1 kg)	1,619 yd (1,480 m)
12-pounder James rifle	3.67 in (9.3 cm)	60 in (152.4 cm)	875 lb (397 kg)	900 lb (408 kg)	12 lb (5.4 kg)	0.75 lb (0.3 kg)	1,700 yd (1,554 m)
3-inch Ordnance rifle	3.0 in (7.6 cm)	69 in (175.3 cm)	820 lb (372 kg)	900 lb (408 kg)	9.5 lb (4.3 kg)	1.0 lb (0.5 kg)	1,830 yd (1,673 m)
10-pounder Parrott rifle	3.0 in (7.6 cm)	74 in (188.0 cm)	899 lb (408 kg)	900 lb (408 kg)	9.5 lb (4.3 kg)	1.0 lb (0.5 kg)	1,900 yd (1,737 m)
20-pounder Parrott rifle	3.67 in (9.3 cm)	84 in (213.4 cm)	1,750 lb (794 kg)	1,175 lb (533 kg)	20 lb (9.1 kg)	2.0 lb (0.9 kg)	1,900 yd (1,737 m)

== See also ==
- Downey, Brian (2019). "The Weapons of Antietam". Antietam on the Web.
- Morgan, James (2002). "Green Ones and Black Ones: The Most Common Field Pieces of the Civil War". civilwarhome.com.
