= 1st New York Light Artillery Battalion =

Artillery battalion of the Union Army

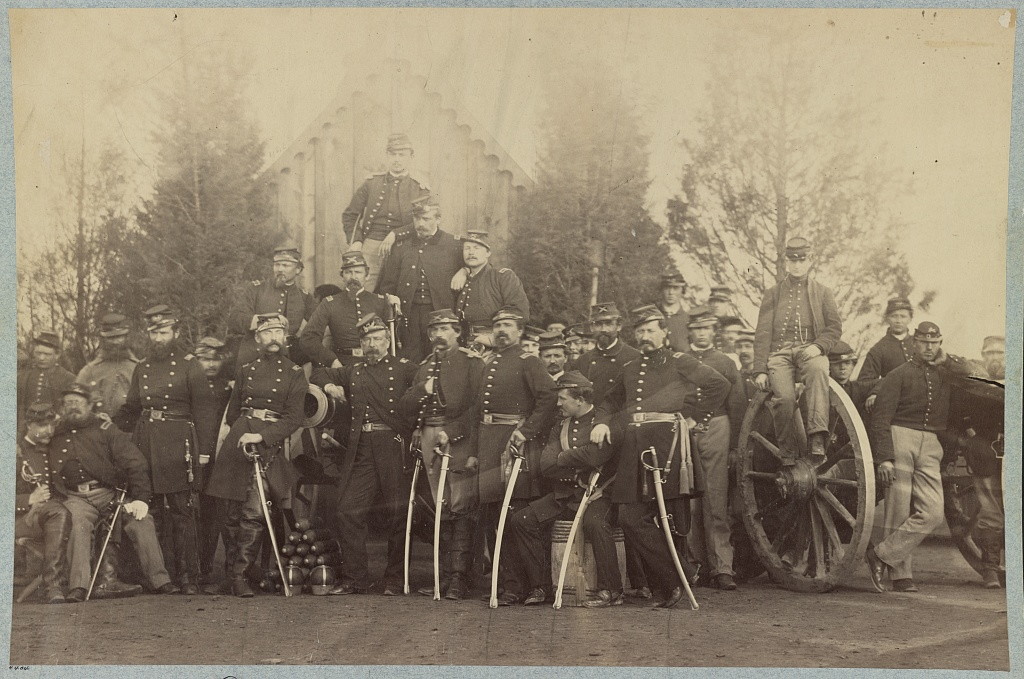
- Officers and enlisted men of the 1st Battalion, New York Light Artillery
- Active: July 1861 – March 5, 1863
- Country: United States
- Allegiance: Union; State of New York
- Branch: Artillery
- Nickname(s): Baden Artillery; Brickel's German Artillery; German Artillery Corps
- Engagements: American Civil War: Siege of Yorktown; Seven Days Battles; Battle of Antietam; Battle of Fredericksburg

Commanders
- Notable commanders: Lieutenant Colonel Andrew Brickel; Major Albert Arndt †

The 1st New York Light Artillery Battalion was a New York State volunteer artillery unit that served in the Union Army during the American Civil War. The unit was initially composed of four artillery companies, which were mustered-in for service in late 1861. Throughout 1862 and early 1863, the battalion saw action in the Eastern Theater before it was reorganized into four independent batteries of the New York Light Artillery, which fought separately for the remainder of the war.

== Unit history ==
=== 1st Battalion of Artillery (Heavy) ===
The 1st Battalion, New York Light Artillery was approved for formation by the United States War Department in July 1861. The unit's companies were raised in New York between August and September 1861 for three-year enlistments and were initially under the command of German-born Lieutenant Colonel Andreas "Andrew" Brickel, a native of Baden in the German Confederation and a former artillery officer of the Baden Revolution of 1848 who had served under Franz Sigel before emigrating to the United States in 1850. The mostly German-speaking unit, described as "nothing but Baden Artillerists under [Lieutenant Colonel Brickel's] command," was in action throughout the Eastern Theater battles of 1862 and early 1863, then dissolved into independent companies prior to the Battle of Chancellorsville, all of which remained in service through most of the war.

The 1st Battalion, New York Light Artillery consisted of four heavy artillery companies and were mustered into federal service on the dates shown below. At the Battle of Antietam on September 16–17, 1862, the batteries were armed as follows.

- Battery A, mustered-in on August 26, 1861 under the command of Captain Otto Diederich – armed with four M1861 20-pounder Parrott rifles
- Battery B, mustered-in on August 12, 1861 under the command of Captain Adolph Voegelee – armed with four M1861 20-pounder Parrott rifles
- Battery C, mustered-in on September 11, 1861 under the command of Captain John Knieriem – armed with four M1861 20-pounder Parrott rifles
- Battery D, mustered-in on September 20, 1861 under the command of Captain Edward Grimm – armed with six M1844 32-pounder howitzers

The battalion spent most of its career in a support role, attached to the Army of the Potomac and comprising the Third Brigade of the Artillery Reserve under Major Albert Arndt. Arndt was mortally wounded on September 16, 1862, and died two days later. At Antietam, the battery commanders were Lieutenant Bernard Wever (A), Lieutenant Alfred von Kleiser (B), Captain Robert Langner (C), and Captain Charles Kusserow (D). After Antietam, Battery D was rearmed with 3-inch Ordnance rifles because the 32-pounders were too heavy for field operations.

=== Detailed service ===
Left New York for Washington, D.C., October 20, 1861. All four batteries assigned to the defenses of the Capital until March 1862. Transferred to Artillery Reserve of the Army of the Potomac, comprising the Third Brigade. Joined Major General George B. McClellan's Peninsula Campaign in Virginia: present at the Siege of Yorktown, April 5 – May 4, 1862; Major Albert Arndt, commanding battalion (Lieutenant Colonel Brickel resigned May 12, 1862); at the Seven Days Battles near Richmond, Virginia, June 25 – July 1, 1862; in camp at Harrison's Landing on the James River until August 16, 1862. Retreated across the Virginia Peninsula and present with Army of the Potomac during the Maryland Campaign; at the Battle of Antietam, September 16–17, 1862 (battalion commander Major Arndt, mortally wounded). Batteries remained attached to Army of the Potomac's Artillery Reserve under Lieutenant Colonel William Hays. At the Battle of Fredericksburg, December 12–15, 1862. Winter camp at Falmouth, Virginia, and participated in the "Mud March" of January 1863.

=== Dissolution of battalion and reorganization as Independent Batteries ===
The battalion organization was discontinued after March 5, 1863, when the four artillery batteries were reorganized as independent companies of the New York Light Artillery for the remainder of the war:

- Battery A, re-designated as the 29th Independent Battery, New York Light Artillery (commanders: Captain Otto Diederich and Captain Bernard Wever)
  - Mustered out, August 15, 1864.
- Battery B, re-designated as the 30th Independent Battery, New York Light Artillery (commanders: Captain Adolph Voegelee, Captain Alfred von Kleiser, Captain Conrad Carrolin, and Lieutenant Charles Hausmann)
  - Mustered out, June 23, 1865.
- Battery C, re-designated as the 31st Independent Battery, New York Light Artillery (commanders: Captain John Knieriem, Captain Charles Kusserow, Captain Robert Langner, and Captain Gustav von Blucher)
  - Mustered out, October 25, 1864.
- Battery D, re-designated as the 32nd Independent Battery, New York Light Artillery (commanders: Captain Edward Grimm, Captain Robert Langner, Captain Charles Kusserow, and Captain Patrick Hart)
  - Mustered out, July 12, 1865.

== See also ==
- List of New York Civil War regiments
- New York in the Civil War
- Field Artillery of the American Civil War
