= 1st New York Light Artillery =

1st New York Light Artillery may refer to the following volunteer units that served in the Union army during the American Civil War:

- 1st New York Light Artillery Battalion
- 1st New York Light Artillery Regiment
