= Francis Alger =

American mineralogist

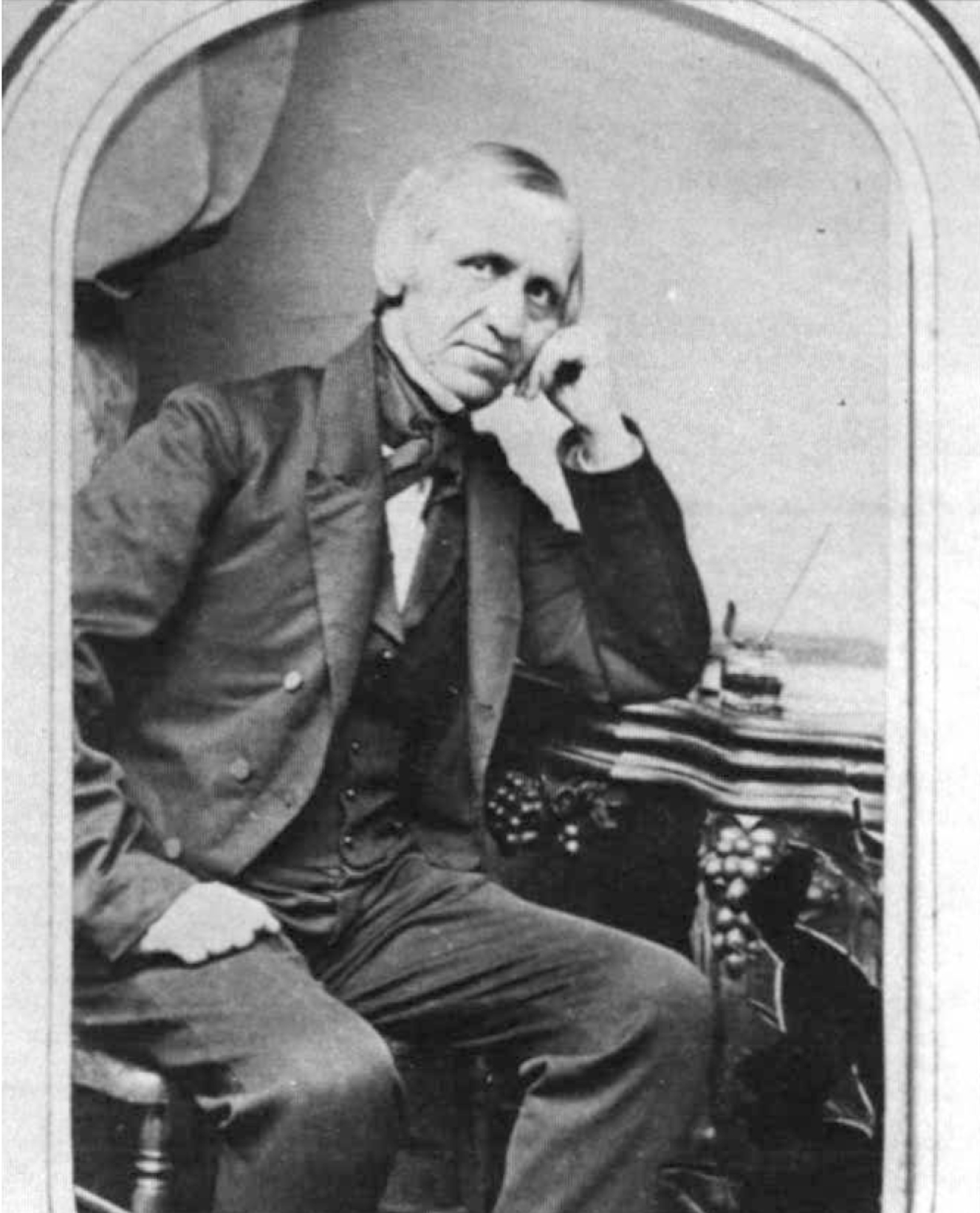
- Born: March 8, 1807; Boston, Massachusetts, U.S.
- Died: November 27, 1863 (aged 56); Washington, D.C., U.S.
- Occupations: Mineralogist, industrialist
- Spouse(s): Mary Louisa Jones (1st), Lydia W. Smith (2nd)

Francis Alger (March 8, 1807 – November 27, 1863) was an American mineralogist and industrialist.

== Biography ==
Alger was born on March 8, 1807, between Lucy Wills and Cyrus Alger. His work mostly focused on Nova Scotia and New Jersey area. He published several successful articles and amassed a large private collection of minerals.

Alger was a friend of Dr. Charles Thomas Jackson, who was also a mineralogist. In the summer of 1827, they traveled to Nova Scotia, to collect minerals and make observations upon the geology of the area. This trip was probably suggested by Alger, who already have been there in 1826 following his father, and published a short article of the location. And based on the visit, they published A Description of the Mineralogy and Geology of a part of Nova Scotia on the American Journal of Science and Arts Volume 14-15. In 1829, they traveled to Nova Scotia again. And in August 1831, submitted Remarks on the Mineralogy and Geology of Nova Scotia, corrected and enlarged version of the prior 'essay', to the first volume of Memoirs of the American Academy of Arts and Sciences. Next year, they published this article as a book with the similar title.

During the dispute between Jackson and Dr. William T. G. Morton about the discovery of ether anesthesia, Alger testified for Jackson. Their friendship lasted until Alger's death. Notice of the Death of Francis Alger of Boston on the Proceedings of the Boston Society of Natural History (1864) was written by Jackson.

He never had education past common school, but he received an honorary MA from Harvard in 1849. Alger was elected as a fellow of the American Academy of Arts and Sciences in 1833. He was one of the founders and curators of the Boston Society of Natural History. He was also a member of the American Association for the Advancement of Science.

He married Mary Louisa Jones on May 9, 1835. They had 4 children: Herbert Alger (1836, died same year), Francis Alger (1838 – 1922), Marion Mott Alger (1840 – 1923), Alfred Andrews Alger (1841 – died same year). They later divorced, probably after 1841, and Alger married Lydia W Smith on October 13, 1858. They had two children, Lucy Alger (1859 – 1921) and Cyrus Willis Alger (1861 – 1942).

After his father’s death in 1856, Alger took over as manager of the South Boston Iron Company.

He died from typhoid pneumonia in Washington, D.C., U.S. on November 27, 1863. He is buried at the Mount Auburn Cemetery with his family.

== Selected writings ==
- Alger, Francis. "Notes on the Mineralogy of Nova Scotia". The American Journal of Science and Arts. 12: 227–232.
- Jackson, Charles T.; Alger, Francis (1832). Remarks on the mineralogy and geology of the peninsula of Nova Scotia : accompanied by a colored map, illustrative of the structure of the country, and by several views of its scenery. Canadiana.org. Cambridge: E. W. Metcalf and Company.
- Phillips, William (1844). Alger, Francis (ed.). An elementary treatise on mineralogy: comprising an introduction to the science (5th ed.). Boston.
