= 2nd Connecticut Light Artillery Battery =

- Active: September 10, 1862 – August 9, 1865
- Disbanded: August 9, 1865
- Country: United States
- Allegiance: Union
- Branch: Artillery
- Size: Battery
- Nickname(s): Sterling's Battery
- Equipment: 1863: 4 x 14-pounder James rifles &2 x M1841 12-pounder howitzers; 1864: 6 x 3-inch Ordnance rifles
- Engagements: Battle of Gettysburg (1863); Siege of Fort Gaines (1864); Siege of Fort Morgan (1864); Battle of Fort Blakeley (1865)

Commanders
- Captain: John William Sterling
- Captain: Walter S. Hotchkiss

The 2nd Connecticut Light Artillery Battery was recruited from Connecticut and served in the Union Army between September 10, 1862 and August 9, 1865 during the American Civil War.

== Service ==
The 2nd Light Battery, under the command of Captains John W. Sterling and Walter S. Hotchkiss was organized in Bridgeport in August 1862 and mustered into the U.S. Service for three years, or the war on September 10. On October 15, it left for Washington via New York City, where it remained encamped until December 12.

The Battery then moved to Fairfax Courthouse, Virginia, and was assigned to the 2nd Brigade, Casey's Division, under the command of General Stoughton. Near the end of January 1863, it moved to Wolf Run Shoals, forming part of the defences of Washington until June 25, when it reported to General Tyler, commander of the artillery reserve, Army of the Potomac. During the Battle of Gettysburg the Battery was positioned to the left of the center for fifty-six hours, and was fortunate having only three men slightly wounded.

After the battle it moved to Frederick City, then to Washington, arriving on August 20. On August 22, it embarked for New York and served there while the draft was taking place. It then returned to Washington on January 24, 1864, then proceeded to Baltimore, where it embarked for New Orleans for service in the Department of the Gulf. For a time, the Battery was stationed at Brashear City, with one section at Thibodeaux; then proceeded to Algiers, and on July 30, embarked on transport for Dauphin Island, Mobile Harbor. There it was engaged in assisting the fleet under Farragut during the reduction of Fort Gaines and Fort Morgan after which it returned to Algiers then went into winter quarters in New Orleans.

During the winter it was stationed at the mouth of the White River, Kennerville and Greenville, Louisiana, at Fort Morgan, Alabama, and from March 11 to 20, at Barrancas and Pensacola, Florida. Following Pensacola it marched through the Black swamp to Fort Blakely, Alabama, and on April 9, 1865, witnessed the fall of that stronghold. It continued to serve in the Department of the Gulf, returning home in July, where it was mustered out at New Haven, on August 9, 1865.

The Battery served almost three years during which it had marched and travelled about 6,000 miles (9,700 km) used up 205 horses.

== Casualties ==
Its losses were one killed, three wounded, eighteen died of disease and accidents, eight were discharged for disability – a total of thirty.
