= M1857 12-pounder Napoleon =

Gun-Howitzer used during the American Civil War

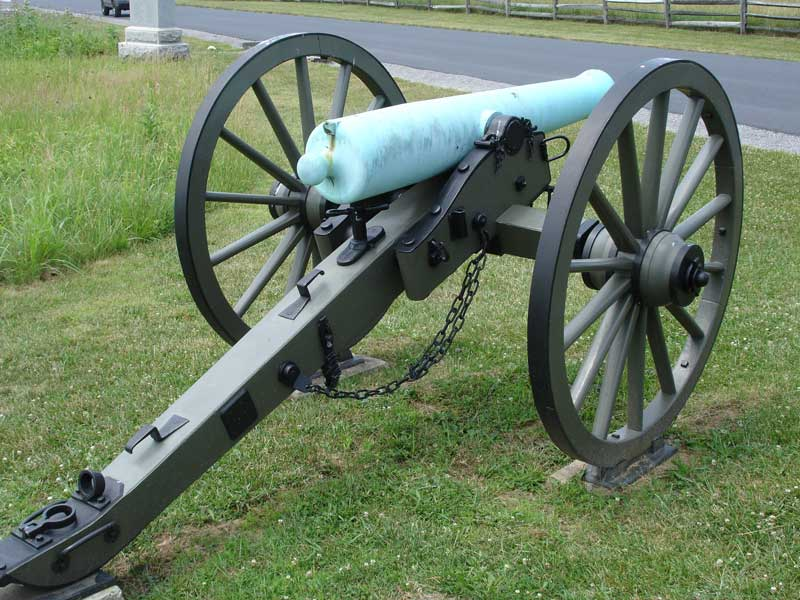
- M1857 12-pounder Napoleon at Gettysburg National Military Park
- Type: Gun-Howitzer
- Place of origin: United States

Service history
- In service: 1857–1865
- Used by: United States
- Wars: American Civil War

Production history
- Manufacturer: Cyrus Alger & Co. Ames Co. Henry N. Hooper & Co. Miles Greenwood & Co. Revere Copper Co.
- Produced: 1857–1864
- No. built: USA: 1,157, CSA: 501

Specifications
- Mass: 1,227 lb (556.6 kg)
- Length: 66.0 in (1.68 m)
- Crew: 9
- Shell weight: 12.3 lb (5.6 kg) shell 2.5 lb (1.1 kg) charge
- Caliber: 4.62 in (117 mm)
- Barrels: 1
- Action: Muzzle loading
- Carriage: 1,128 lb (511.7 kg)
- Rate of fire: 1 rounds/minute
- Muzzle velocity: 1,485 ft/s (453 m/s)
- Effective firing range: 1,680 yd (1,536 m)

The M1857 12-pounder Napoleon or Light 12-pounder gun or 12-pounder gun-howitzer was a bronze smoothbore muzzle-loading artillery piece that was adopted by the United States Army in 1857 and extensively employed in the American Civil War. The gun was the American-manufactured version of the French canon obusier de 12 which combined the functions of both field gun and howitzer. The weapon proved to be simple to produce, reliable, and robust. It fired a 12.03 lb (5.5 kg) round shot a distance of 1,619 to 1,680 yd (1,480 to 1,536 m) at 5° elevation. (Note: The sources Coggins, Katcher, and Ripley provide different ranges for round shot at 5° elevation.) It could also fire canister shot, common shell, and spherical case shot.

The 12-pounder Napoleon outclassed and soon replaced the M1841 6-pounder field gun and the M1841 12-pounder howitzer in the U.S. Army, while replacement of these older weapons was slower in the Confederate States Army. A total of 1,157 were produced for the U.S. Army, all but a few in the period 1861–1863. The Confederate States of America utilized captured U.S. 12-pounder Napoleons and also manufactured about 500 during the war. The weapon was named after Napoleon III of France, who helped develop the weapon.

== Background ==
In the period before the Civil War, a U.S. Army light artillery battery was organized with four M1841 6-pounder field guns and two M1841 12-pounder howitzers. The field gun fired solid iron cannon balls in a flat trajectory to smash its targets while the howitzer was designed to lob hollow shells into massed formations or fortifications. Napoleon III realized that mixing field guns and howitzers within an artillery battery caused the logistical problem of having to carry two types of ammunition. He understood that batteries might become more effective if a single gun could fire both the round shot of the field gun and the common shell and spherical case shot of the howitzer. (Both field guns and howitzers were already capable of firing canister shot.) The French gun designers' solution to the problem was the invention of the canon obusier de 12 or 12-pounder gun-howitzer. By 1856, this new weapon had been adopted by France, Austria, Prussia, Saxony, and Russia. An American military commission sent to Europe in 1855–1856 led by Major Alfred Mordecai wrote a report praising the new gun-howitzer and the U.S. Ordnance Department quickly obtained a license to produce the gun.

On 14 December 1856, the Ames Manufacturing Company received an order to produce a copy of the gun-howitzer, and on 25 March 1857 the Ordnance Department accepted delivery of one 1,187 lb (538 kg) piece for a cost of $546.02. The weapon failed its trial, but in 2004 the original gun could be seen at the Petersburg National Battlefield visitor center. On 28 May 1857, the Ordnance Department ordered four guns of a modified version from Ames and these pieces were delivered on 16 September 1857. The four modified guns were 3 in (76 mm) longer than the original gun and 40 lb (18.1 kg) heavier. These four guns became the standard model for all 12-pounder Napoleons subsequently produced for the U.S. Army.

== Production ==
=== Union ===
When the Civil War broke out in April 1861, the U.S. Army owned only the original five 12-pounder Napoleons. The U.S. Army needed field artillery and there was no time to experiment with new gun types. Since the new gun could be produced quickly, orders were placed with Ames and Cyrus Alger & Company. Later, more contracts were let to Henry N. Hooper & Company, Revere Copper Company, and Miles Greenwood & Company. A single experimental wrought iron Napoleon was manufactured by the Phoenix Iron Works.

One member of the 1855 American military commission was Captain George B. McClellan who became major general in command of U.S. forces in summer 1861. Like Mordecai, McClellan saw the advantages of using a single artillery piece to combine the functions of both field gun and howitzer. In 1861, McClellan approved the plan offered by his chief of artillery Brigadier General William Farquhar Barry, which included the goal to arm Union Army field artillery batteries exclusively with the light 12-pounder smoothbore, the 3-inch Ordnance rifle, and the Parrott rifle. Each battery was organized so as to contain six identical guns, if possible, with no less than four guns per battery. By the time of the First Battle of Bull Run in July 1861, the U.S. Army had only nine 12-pounder Napoleons, and by 1 January 1862, it had only 36 Napoleons. In August 1861, 22 Napoleons were ordered and 153 were ordered in October and November 1861.

When it became clear that the war would be a long one, many more guns were ordered. The number of 12-pounder Napoleons produced for the Federal government each year were 1861 (179), 1862 (422), 1863 (512), and 1864 (13). In 1864, 39 Napoleons were produced for the states of Massachusetts, New Jersey, and Ohio. The U.S. manufacturers and how many guns they produced are shown in the following table.

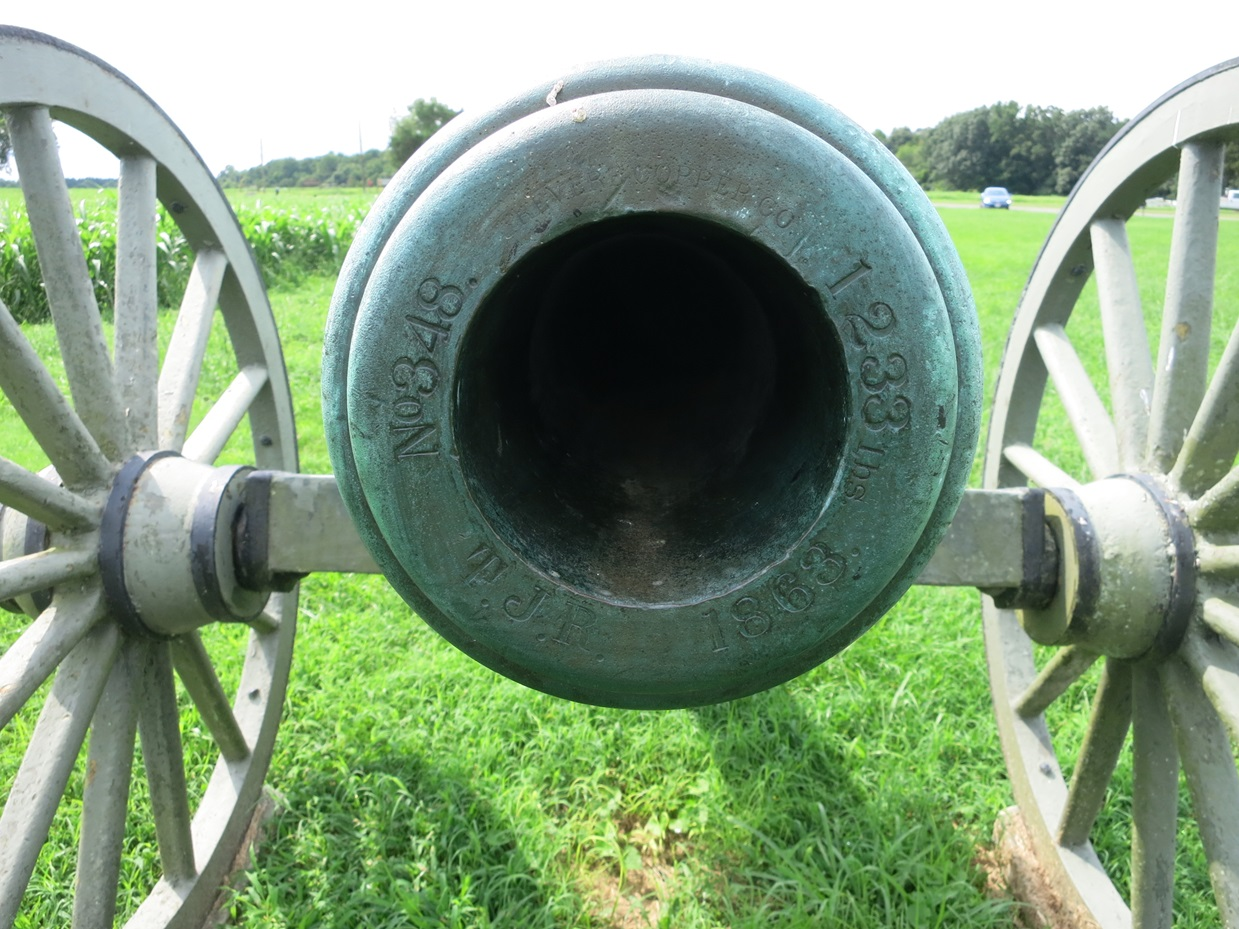
Muzzle of a 12-pounder Napoleon at Malvern Hill reads: "No348 (registry) - Revere Copper Co. (faintly) - 1233 lbs. - 1863 - T.J.R. (Thomas Jefferson Rodman, inspector)".

Manufacturers of US Army 12-pounder Napoleons
Maker	Location	No. Produced
Ames Manufacturing Co.	Chicopee, Massachusetts	103
Cyrus Alger & Co.	Boston, Massachusetts	170
Henry M. Hooper & Co.	Boston, Massachusetts	370
Miles Greenwood & Co.	Cincinnati, Ohio	52
Phoenix Iron Works	Phoenixville, Pennsylvania	1
Revere Copper Co.	Boston, Massachusetts	461

=== Confederate ===
The Confederate States started the Civil War with its batteries largely armed with the M1841 6-pounder field guns and M1841 12-pounder howitzers found in Southern arsenals. The Confederate States were hampered by having an inferior industrial capacity compared to the North and were far behind in the production of 12-pounder Napoleons. In addition, the South suffered from such a shortage of copper that in May 1861 no bronze guns could be produced. In December 1861, bronze gun casting resumed when enough copper was found, mostly from melted down stills and church bells. On 10 July 1862, Confederate chief of ordnance Colonel Josiah Gorgas sent the Tredegar Iron Works plans for the 12-pounder Napoleon. Gorgas asked that all production of the 6-pounder gun and 12-pounder howitzer be suspended, so that the new Napoleons could be manufactured. On 13 November 1862, Gorgas ordered that 12-pounder Napoleons should be the only bronze artillery pieces produced. On 5 December 1862, General Robert E. Lee wrote to the Confederate Secretary of War James Seddon asking that most 6-pounder guns and some 12-pounder howitzers be melted down and recast as 12-pounder Napoleons. By the Battle of Gettysburg on 1–3 July 1863, Lee's army received 49 of the recast Napoleons. The Confederate manufacturers and how many guns they produced are shown in the following table.

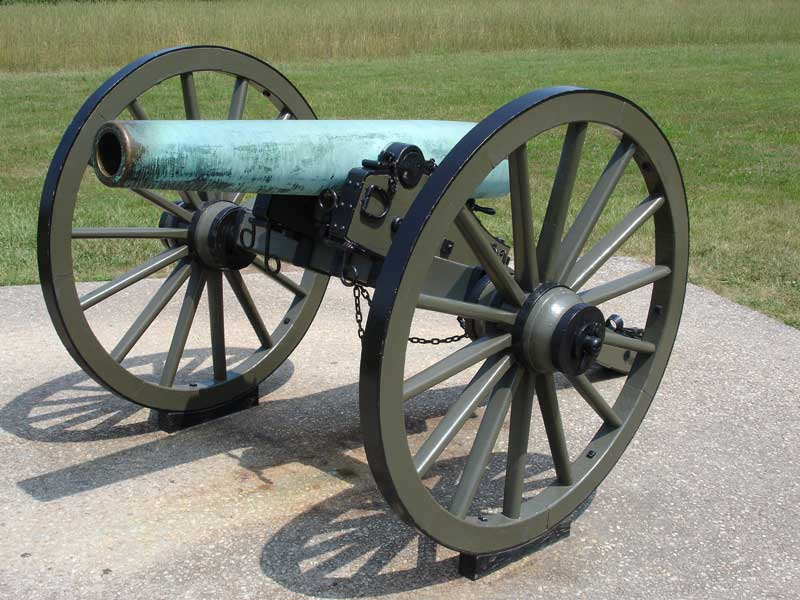
Confederate-made 12-pounder Napoleon at Gettysburg shows a lack of muzzle swell.

Manufacturers of Confederate 12-pounder Napoleons
Maker	Location	No. Produced
Augusta Arsenal	Augusta, Georgia	c. 130
Charleston Arsenal	Charleston, South Carolina	c. 20
Columbus Arsenal	Columbus, Georgia	52
Leeds & Company	New Orleans, Louisiana	12
Macon Arsenal	Macon, Georgia	53
Quinby & Robinson	Memphis, Tennessee	8
Tredegar Iron Works	Richmond, Virginia	226

The first order for Confederate 12-pounder Napoleons came on 7 February 1861 when Georgia ordered 12 guns from the Tredegar Iron Works, but it is unclear whether this batch was ever produced. Leeds & Company shipped two 12-pounder Napoleons on 19 December 1861. The Federal capture of New Orleans in April 1862 ended production of Napoleons at Leeds & Company, while the Union capture of Memphis in June 1862 ended production at Quinby & Robinson. Most Confederate-manufactured Napoleons did not have the muzzle swell that was characteristic of US-manufactured Napoleons. In December 1863, Federal troops captured the copper mines at Ducktown, Tennessee, stopping all manufacture of bronze cannons in the Confederate States. After this, the Tredegar Iron Works produced a cast iron Napoleon with a 2 in (51 mm) thick breech band.

== Specifications ==
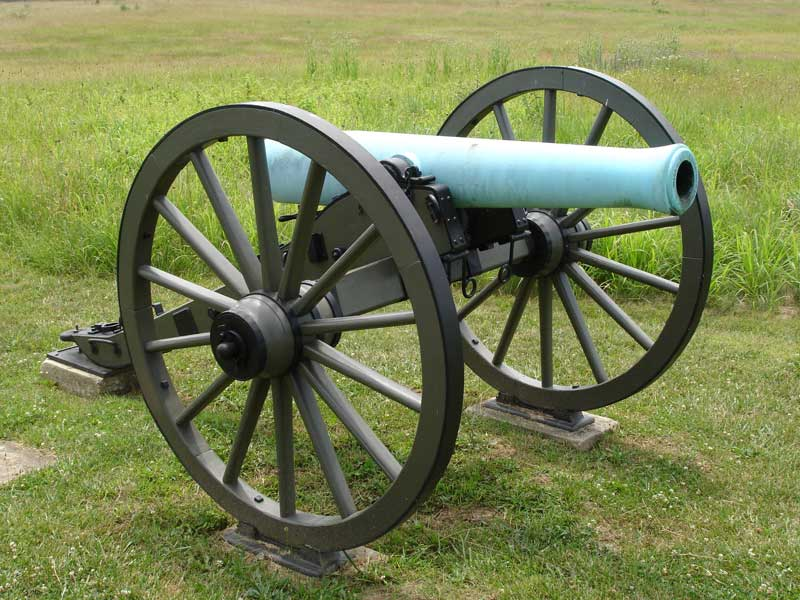
Federal Model 1857 12-pounder Napoleon

The Model 1857 bronze 12-pounder Napoleon gun barrel was 72.15 in (183.3 cm) from the muzzle to the end of the knob and weighed 1,227 lb (556.6 kg). The diameter of the bore (caliber) was 4.62 in (11.7 cm) and the bore length was 63.6 in (161.5 cm). With a 2.5 lb (1.1 kg) gunpowder charge it was capable of firing solid shot 1,680 yd (1,536 m) at 5° elevation and spherical case (shrapnel) shot 1,135 yd (1,038 m) at 3°45' elevation. With a 2.0 lb (0.9 kg) gunpowder charge it was capable of firing common shell 1,300 yd (1,189 m) at 3°45' elevation. The cannon fired a 12.25 lb (5.6 kg) round shot of 4.52 in (11.5 cm) diameter. The spherical case shot weighed 12.1 lb (5.5 kg) and released 78 musket balls when it burst. The canister round weighed 14.8 lb (6.7 kg) and contained 27 iron balls that were 1.49 in (3.8 cm) in diameter or slightly smaller. Canister shot was packed in four tiers within the canister round. When fired, canister was effective up to a distance of 350 yd (320 m).

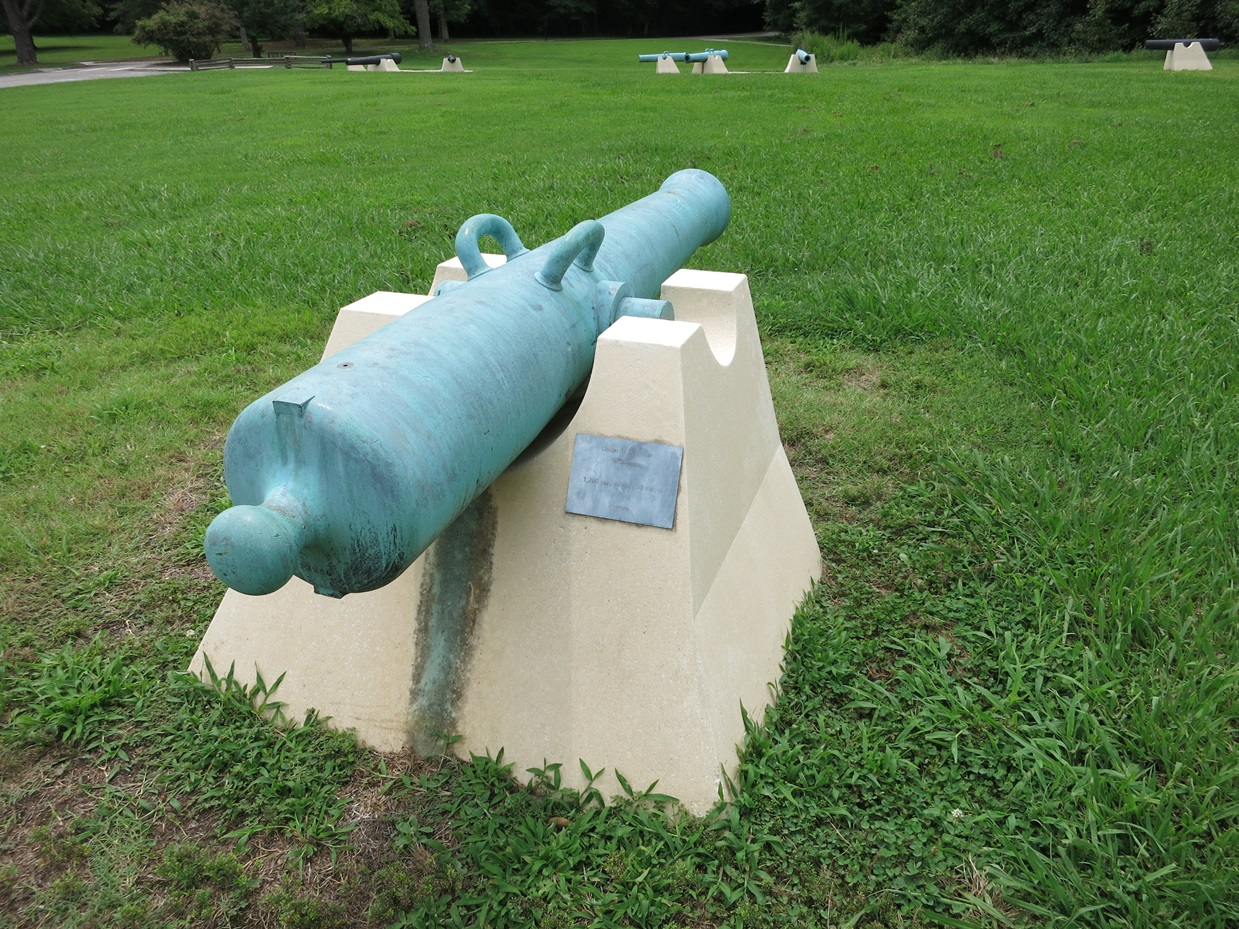
Model 1857 12-pounder Napoleon with handles is located at Petersburg National Battlefield visitor center.

The first 12-pounder Napoleons produced by Northern gun foundries included a pair of handles attached to the top of the gun barrel. As many as 33 were manufactured before the handles were eliminated in late 1861. Of the 21 surviving Napoleons with handles, 17 were produced by Ames, 3 by Alger, and 1 by Revere. Ames also manufactured 6 bronze rifled Napoleons in 1862; all survived and were located at Gettysburg National Military Park in 2004. The Napoleon was a very dependable weapon. In 1864, U.S. Chief of Ordnance Brigadier General George D. Ramsay wrote, "No instance has occurred during the war ... of the 12-pdr bronze gun (the Napoleon) having worn out or of its bursting." Many Confederate gunners preferred the Napoleons produced in the North because of their higher quality. A British observer, Arthur Lyon Fremantle noted in 1863 that many of the guns belonging to the Army of Northern Virginia were captured pieces of Northern manufacture.

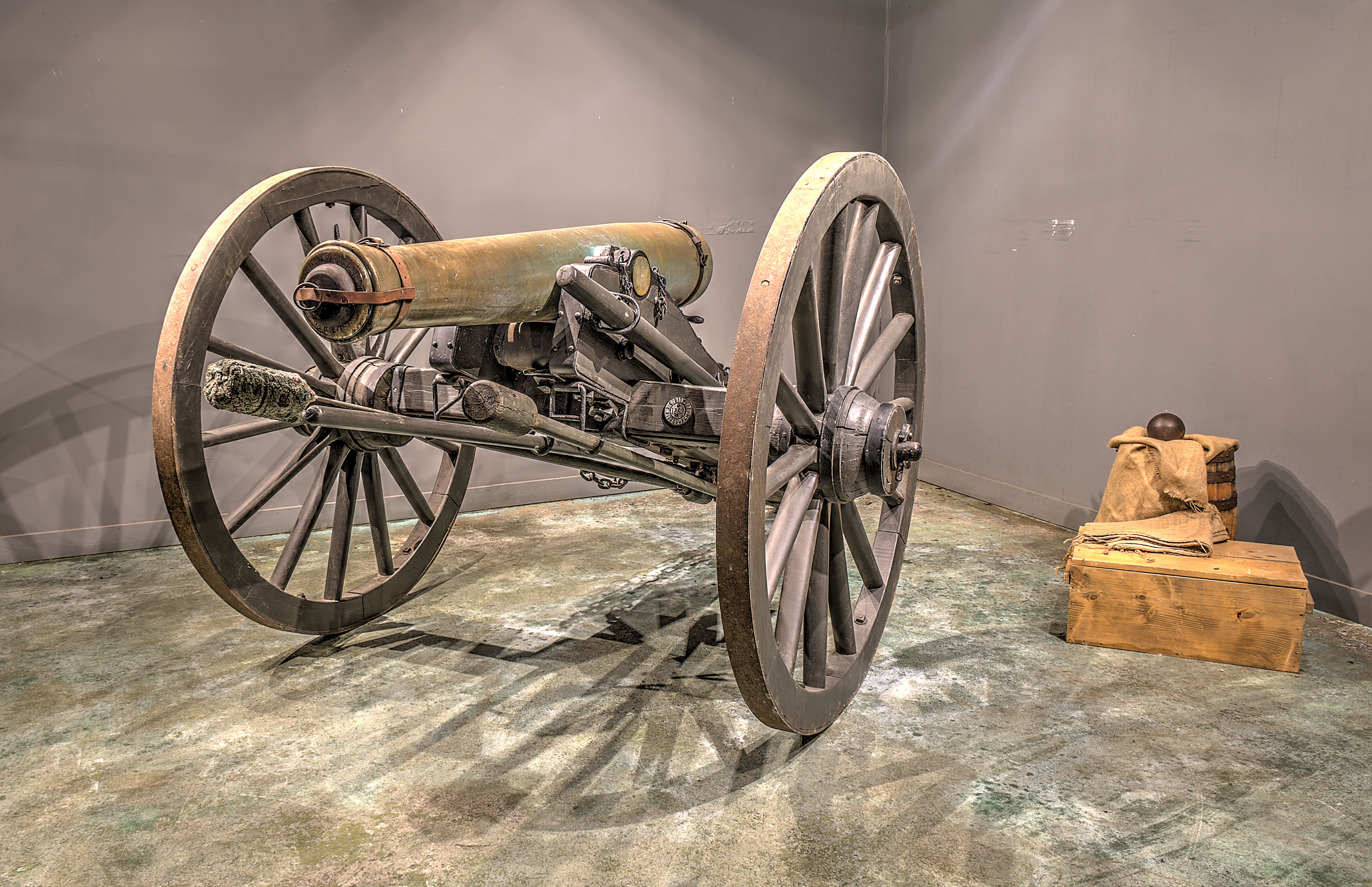
Model 1857 12-pounder Napoleon at National Civil War Naval Museum

The 12-pounder Napoleon was the most favored field gun of both Union and Confederate armies. It was fairly accurate at all ranges and especially lethal when firing canister at close range. The Napoleon was mounted on a carriage weighing 1,128 lb (511.7 kg). The Napoleon fired the same ammunition and propellent charges as the M1841 12-pounder field gun, but its tube and carriage were 577 lb (261.7 kg) lighter than those of the older artillery piece. A 6-gun Union battery of Napoleons was made up of three 2-gun sections. Each gun was hitched to a limber drawn by six horses and accompanied by a limber and caisson drawn by six horses. There was one ammunition box on each limber and two ammunition boxes on each caisson. Generally, each battery also had six reserve limber and caissons, one traveling forge wagon, and one battery wagon hauling equipment.

The ammunition box for the Napoleon contained 32 rounds. At Gettysburg, the 5th Maine Light Artillery Battery, armed with six 12-pounder Napoleons, carried 288 round shot, 288 spherical case, 96 common shells, and 96 canister rounds in its limbers and caissons. In a single ammunition box there were 12 shot, 12 spherical case, 4 shells, 4 canister rounds, and 48 friction primers. But this allocation of ammunition changed. According to the 1864 U.S. Army Field Artillery Instructions, the ammunition box contained 20 round shot, 8 spherical case, and 4 canister rounds. The 1863 Confederate States Ordnance Manual recommended that the Napoleon's ammunition box carry 12 shot, 12 spherical case, 4 shell, and 4 canister rounds. A 6-gun battery of 12-pounder Napoleons with two caissons per gun required 20 6-horse teams and 10 extra horses. Each 6-horse team was controlled by three drivers and each gun crew was made up of nine cannoneers.

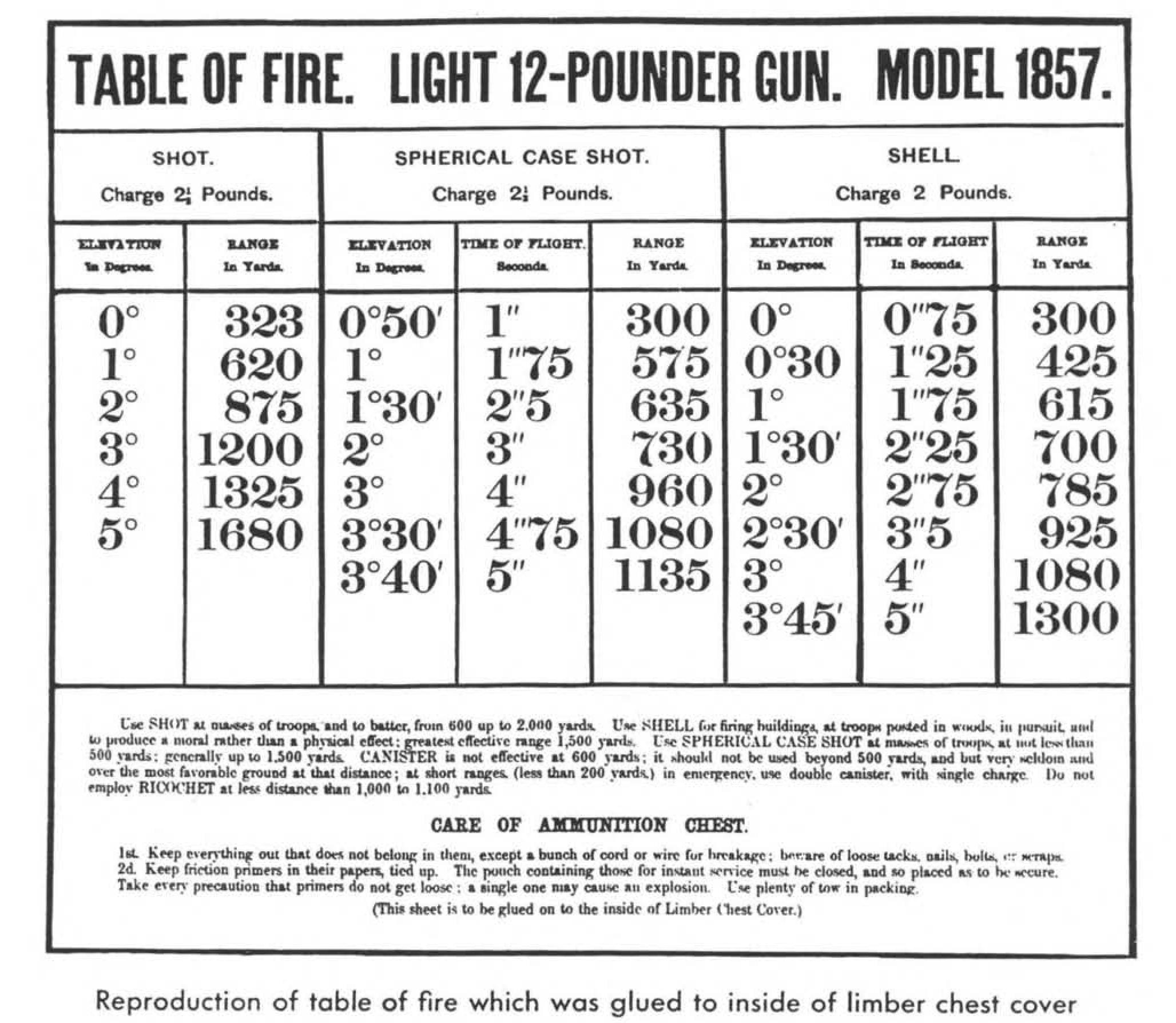

== History ==
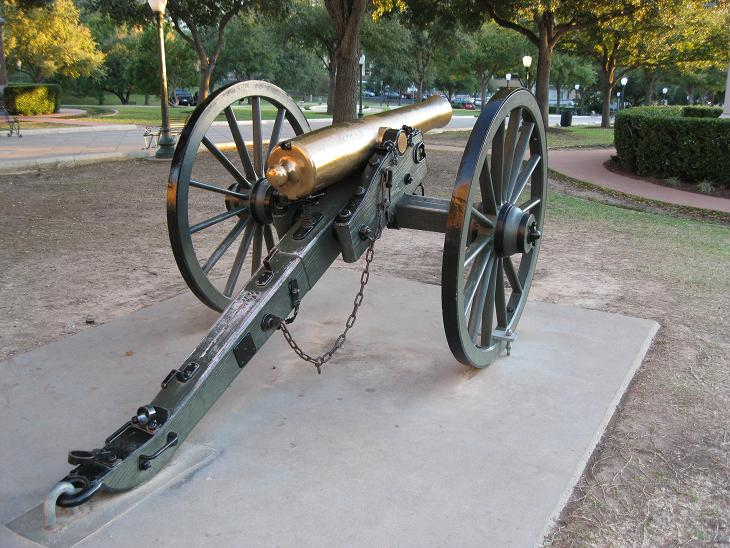
12-pounder Napoleon manufactured in 1864 is located in front of the Texas State Capitol in Austin, Texas.

General Barry pointed out that after the First Battle of Bull Run, there were only nine artillery batteries of mixed calibers available, drawn by 400 horses and manned by 650 men. By strenuous efforts, in March 1862 when McClellan's Army of the Potomac took the field, there were 92 batteries containing 520 guns, 12,500 men, and 11,000 horses. Many obsolete guns brought by volunteer artillery units in the Eastern Theater were soon replaced by newer guns. Older guns rejected in the east migrated to the Western Theater and were used to equip the western Union armies. The 1862 inventory by the Ohio Quartermaster General listed only ten 12-pounder Napoleons out of 162 available guns, compared to forty-four 3.8-inch James rifles, thirty-eight rifled 6-pounder guns, and thirty M1841 6-pounder field guns. As late as the Battle of Prairie Grove on 7 December 1862, fought in Arkansas, the Union forces employed 40 guns, but none of them were Napoleons.

At the Battle of Antietam on 16–17 September 1862, out of 301 artillery pieces, the well-equipped Army of the Potomac had one hundred seventeen 12-pounder Napoleons, eighty-one 3-inch Ordnance rifles and fifty-seven 10-pounder Parrott rifles. On the same battlefield, the Confederate Army of Northern Virginia employed only fourteen Napoleons, compared to forty-four M1841 12-pounder howitzers, forty-three 10-pounder Parrott rifles, and forty-one M1841 6-pounder guns. Most Confederate batteries were made up of a mix of guns. Captain M. B. Miller's 3rd Company of the Washington Artillery was exceptional in that it was composed of four 12-pounder Napoleons. Captain Joseph B. Campbell's 4th U.S. Artillery, Battery B, armed with six 12-pounder Napoleons, was deployed in an exposed position near the Bloody Cornfield at dawn and suffered heavy casualties. While in action, infantry volunteers served some of the guns as they fired double canister rounds. Not knowing that he was supposed to remove the second gunpowder charge, one volunteer loaded two full canister charges. The Napoleon recoiled violently with each discharge, but at the end of the action the gun was found to be undamaged.

During the Battle of Fort Sanders on November 29, 1863, the 12-pounder Napoleons used by the Federals fired triple canister. The Union armies in the Western Theater eventually received their share of 12-pounder Napoleons. On 30 June 1863, the Army of the Cumberland reported having 220 artillery pieces, including sixty Napoleons, forty-five 3.8-inch James rifles, thirty-four 3-inch Ordnance rifles, and thirty-two 10-pounder Parrott rifles. On the same date, the Army of the Ohio counted 72 artillery pieces, including eighteen Napoleons, twenty-six 3.8-inch James rifles, and twelve 3-inch Ordnance rifles. In the Army of the Potomac at the Battle of Gettysburg, every bronze smoothbore on the field was a Napoleon except two 12-pounder howitzers in the 2nd Connecticut Light Artillery Battery. When William Tecumseh Sherman's western army began the Atlanta campaign in May 1864, it included 110,000 soldiers and 254 artillery pieces, of which every one was a 12-pounder Napoleon, 10- or 20-pounder Parrott rifle, or 3-inch Ordnance rifle.

== Civil War artillery ==
Characteristics of common American Civil War artillery pieces
Description	Caliber	Tube length	Tube weight	Carriage weight	Shot weight	Charge weight	Range 5° elev.
M1841 6-pounder cannon	3.67 in (9.3 cm)	60 in (152.4 cm)	884 lb (401 kg)	900 lb (408 kg)	6.1 lb (2.8 kg)	1.25 lb (0.6 kg)	1,523 yd (1,393 m)
M1841 12-pounder cannon	4.62 in (11.7 cm)	78 in (198.1 cm)	1,757 lb (797 kg)	1,175 lb (533 kg)	12.3 lb (5.6 kg)	2.5 lb (1.1 kg)	1,663 yd (1,521 m)
M1841 12-pounder howitzer	4.62 in (11.7 cm)	53 in (134.6 cm)	788 lb (357 kg)	900 lb (408 kg)	8.9 lb (4.0 kg)	1.0 lb (0.5 kg)	1,072 yd (980 m)
M1841 24-pounder howitzer	5.82 in (14.8 cm)	65 in (165.1 cm)	1,318 lb (598 kg)	1,128 lb (512 kg)	18.4 lb (8.3 kg)	2.0 lb (0.9 kg)	1,322 yd (1,209 m)
M1857 12-pounder Napoleon	4.62 in (11.7 cm)	66 in (167.6 cm)	1,227 lb (557 kg)	1,128 lb (512 kg)	12.3 lb (5.6 kg)	2.5 lb (1.1 kg)	1,619 yd (1,480 m)
12-pounder James rifle	3.67 in (9.3 cm)	60 in (152.4 cm)	875 lb (397 kg)	900 lb (408 kg)	12 lb (5.4 kg)	0.75 lb (0.3 kg)	1,700 yd (1,554 m)
3-inch Ordnance rifle	3.0 in (7.6 cm)	69 in (175.3 cm)	820 lb (372 kg)	900 lb (408 kg)	9.5 lb (4.3 kg)	1.0 lb (0.5 kg)	1,830 yd (1,673 m)
10-pounder Parrott rifle	3.0 in (7.6 cm)	74 in (188.0 cm)	899 lb (408 kg)	900 lb (408 kg)	9.5 lb (4.3 kg)	1.0 lb (0.5 kg)	1,900 yd (1,737 m)
20-pounder Parrott rifle	3.67 in (9.3 cm)	84 in (213.4 cm)	1,750 lb (794 kg)	1,175 lb (533 kg)	20 lb (9.1 kg)	2.0 lb (0.9 kg)	1,900 yd (1,737 m)

== Notes ==
Footnotes

Citations

== See also ==
- Downey, Brian (2019). "The Weapons of Antietam". Antietam on the Web.
- Morgan, James (2002). "Green Ones and Black Ones: The Most Common Field Pieces of the Civil War". civilwarhome.com.
