= 22nd South Carolina Infantry Regiment =

- Flag of South Carolina
- Active: 29 January 1861 – 9 April 1865
- Country: Confederate States of America
- Allegiance: South Carolina
- Branch: Confederate States Army
- Type: Infantry
- Size: Regiment
- Engagements: American Civil War; Battle of Secessionville; First Battle of Rappahannock Station; Second Battle of Bull Run; Battle of South Mountain; Battle of Antietam; Battle of Kinston; Siege of Jackson; Bermuda Hundred campaign; Siege of Petersburg; Battle of the Crater; Battle of Sailor's Creek; Battle of Appomattox

The 22nd South Carolina Infantry Regiment was a Confederate infantry regiment in the American Civil War from the state of South Carolina. The regiment was organized in January 1862 and fought that year at Secessionville, 1st Rappahannock Station, 2nd Bull Run, South Mountain, Antietam, and Kinston. In 1863, it fought at Jackson and Charleston Harbor. In 1864, the regiment took part in the Bermuda Hundred campaign and the Siege of Petersburg. During the siege, many of its soldiers were blown up at the Battle of the Crater. The remnants of the unit surrendered at Sailor's Creek and Appomattox in April 1865.

== See also ==
- List of South Carolina Confederate Civil War units
