= 3-inch ordnance rifle =

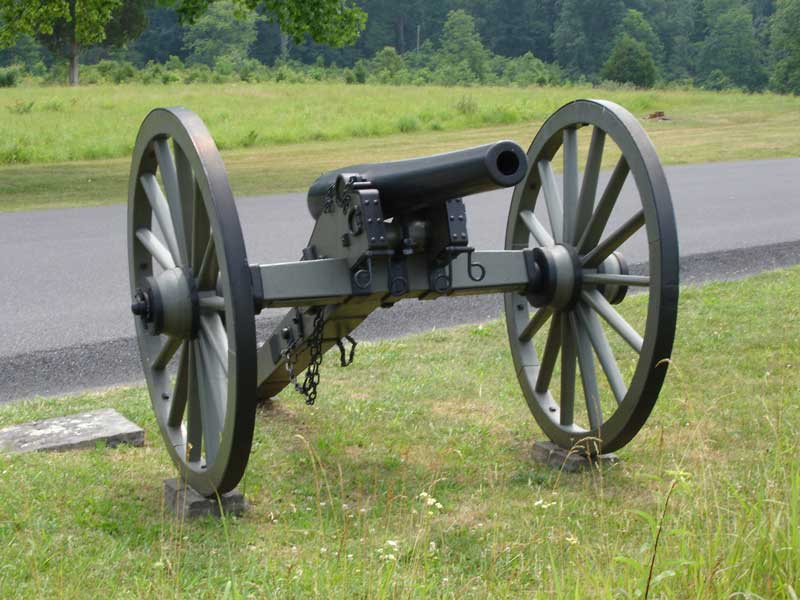
- 3-inch ordnance rifle, model 1861
- Type: Rifled cannon
- Place of origin: United States

Service history
- In service: 1860–1880s
- Used by: United States, Confederate States
- Wars: American Civil War

Production history
- Designer: John Griffen, Jr. Samuel J. Reeves; U.S. Ordnance Dept.
- Designed: 1854, 1862
- Manufacturer: Phoenix Iron Works (Phoenixville, Pennsylvania)
- Unit cost: $330–$350
- Produced: 1860–1867
- No. built: 1,100
- Variants: 1854 (Griffen gun)

Specifications
- Mass: 820 lb (371.9 kg)
- Length: 69 in (1.75 m)
- Crew: 9
- Shell weight: 9.5 lb (4.3 kg) shell 1.0 lb (0.5 kg) charge
- Caliber: 3.0 in (76 mm)
- Barrels: 1
- Action: Muzzleloading
- Carriage: 900 lb (408 kg)
- Muzzle velocity: 1,215 ft/s (370 m/s)
- Effective firing range: 1,830 yd (1,670 m) at 5°
- Maximum firing range: 4,180 yd (3,820 m) at 16°

The 3-inch ordnance rifle, model 1861 was a muzzleloading and rifled cannon that was adopted by the United States Army in 1861 and widely used in field artillery units during the American Civil War. Made of wrought iron, it was capable of firing a 9.5 lb (4.3 kg) projectile 1,830 yd (1,670 m) at an elevation of 5°. The 3-inch rifle was not as effective in firing canister shot as the heavier 12-pounder Napoleon, but it proved to be highly accurate at longer ranges when firing common shell or conical case shot. There was only one reported case of a 3-inch ordnance rifle bursting in action. This was in stark contrast to the similarly sized 10-pounder Parrott rifles which occasionally burst without warning, inflicting injury on the gun crews. The Confederate States of America lacked the technology to manufacture reliable copies of the 3-inch ordnance rifle, but the Confederate States Army respected the weapons and employed those captured from Federal forces.

== Background ==
=== Griffen gun ===
By 1835, so many 6-pounder cast iron cannons had burst during proofing tests that the United States Ordnance Department decided to abandon cast iron and produce field artillery from bronze. The successful M1841 6-pounder field gun was the result of this decision. Gun founders had tried to produce cannons from wrought iron, but the material had not fulfilled its promise. In 1844, the 12-inch wrought iron "Peacemaker" cannon burst during a demonstration aboard the USS Princeton, killing the Secretaries of State and the Navy and others. The accident was caused by bad forging and burned metal.

In 1854, Safe Harbor Iron Works of Lancaster County, Pennsylvania produced high-quality iron rods used in lighthouse construction. The company's superintendent John Griffen proposed manufacturing a cannon by welding together a bundle of wrought iron rods and then drilling out the bore. Later, the process was refined by winding a bar spirally around the bundle. Two additional bars were wound around the bundle and then the mass was subjected to welding heat. Finally, trunnions were added and a bore was drilled out. Samuel J. Reeves, president of Safe Harbor's parent company Phoenix Iron Works, approved of Griffen's method and a cannon was manufactured in late 1854.

The approximately 700 lb (318 kg) Griffen gun was sent to Fort Monroe for trial but it was not immediately tested. Meanwhile, Griffen was issued a patent for the gun on 25 December 1855. Captain Alexander Brydie Dyer undertook proofing tests of the gun in 1856 with Griffen as a witness. The gun passed the proofing tests and when Dyer asked if he wanted to continue, Griffen challenged him to burst the gun. The Griffen gun was subsequently fired 500 times with no apparent damage. Then the gun was fired nine more times with increasing numbers of shot and heavier gunpowder charges. The gun finally burst on the tenth shot when the bore was filled to the muzzle with 13 shot and 7 lb (3 kg) of gunpowder. After Dyer's highly favorable report, four more Griffen guns were manufactured and sent to be tested.

=== Reeves's process ===
The U.S. Ordnance Department requested four wrought iron guns of 3.5 in (89 mm) caliber on 21 February 1861. The government only bought two of these guns, paying $370 apiece, but neither gun are known to have survived. Phoenix Iron Company also produced a few 6-pounders of 3.67 in (93 mm) caliber of which seven survivors are dated 1861 and have "PATENTED DEC. 25, 1855" stamped on one trunnion. On 24 July 1861, General James Wolfe Ripley of the U.S. Army ordered 300 wrought iron rifled cannons from Phoenix Iron Works. The U.S. Ordnance Department designed a gun that eliminated all decorations so that the gun barrel consisted of a "blended sweeping curve". The cost was between $330 and $350 per gun.

Reeves soon discovered that using Griffen's original technique produced only one good gun out of three attempts. A modification to Griffen's process still resulted in 40% of the gun barrels being unusable. A frustrated Reeves then invented an entirely new method of production. He started with a hollow tube or solid bar of wrought iron and wrapped it with sheets of iron until the pile was the diameter of the gun's bore. Sheets of iron were wrapped around the pile and forged and welded to the pile. The finished gun block was then bored out, removing almost all of the original pile. Reeves filed for a patent for his new method and convinced the examiners that it was different from a process described in an earlier patent granted to David T. Yeakel. His process received a patent on 9 December 1862.

=== Production ===
Phoenix Iron Works produced 1,100 wrought iron 3-inch ordnance rifles during the war. Singer, Nimick and Company manufactured 6 rifles with a profile identical to the ordnance rifle, but they were made of steel and much more expensive. Three are known to have survived. One surviving 3-inch wrought iron Wiard rifle exists, but it has an unusual band across the trunnions. The Confederate States manufactured an estimated 84 cast iron 3-inch rifles, at least 61 of them at the Tredegar Iron Works; several appear to be imitations of the U.S. Ordnance Department design. However, the Tredegar guns were manufactured with cast iron and earned a bad reputation for bursting in action.

== Specifications ==
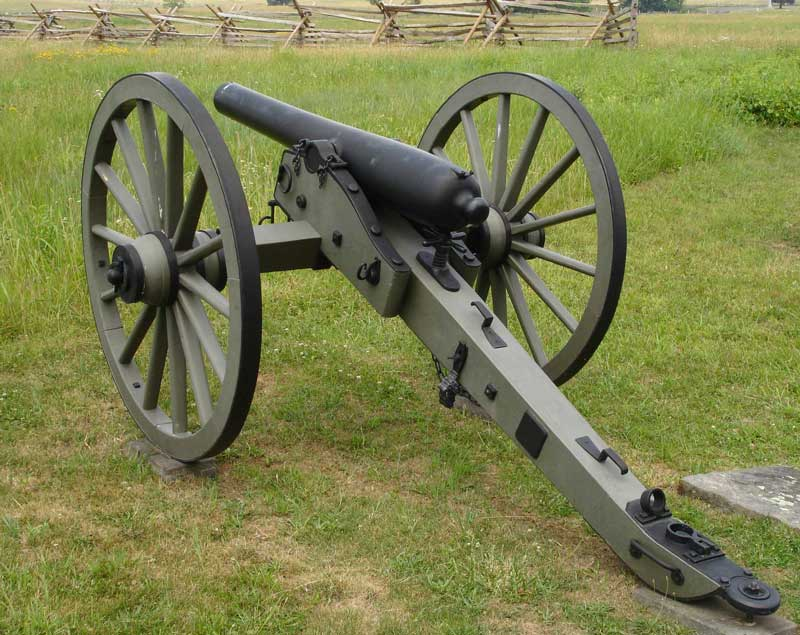
3-inch ordnance rifle, model 1861

The muzzleloading 3-inch ordnance rifle, Model 1861 had a bore (caliber) with a diameter of 3.0 in (76 mm). Its gun barrel weighed 820 lb (371.9 kg) and fired a projectile weighing 9.5 lb (4.3 kg). The gunpowder charge weighed 1.0 lb (0.5 kg) and fired the projectile with a muzzle velocity of 1,215 ft/s (370 m/s) to a distance of 1,830 yd (1,673 m) at 5° elevation. The 3-inch rifle could hurl a shell 4,180 yd (3,822 m) at 16° elevation. Unlike a smoothbore cannon, the 3-inch rifle's projectile retained two-thirds of its muzzle velocity at 1,500 yd (1,372 m) – or 839 ft/s (256 m/s) – so that its rifled projectile was invisible in flight. A smoothbore cannon's projectile retained only one-third of its muzzle velocity at that range and its round shot could be seen in the air. However, a rifled projectile could become visible if the shell began to tumble out of control. Tumbling occurred when the shell failed to take the grooves inside the gun barrel or when the spin wore off in flight. The 3-inch gun's rifling consisted of seven lands and grooves with a right-hand twist. The twist rate was one turn in 11 ft (3.4 m).

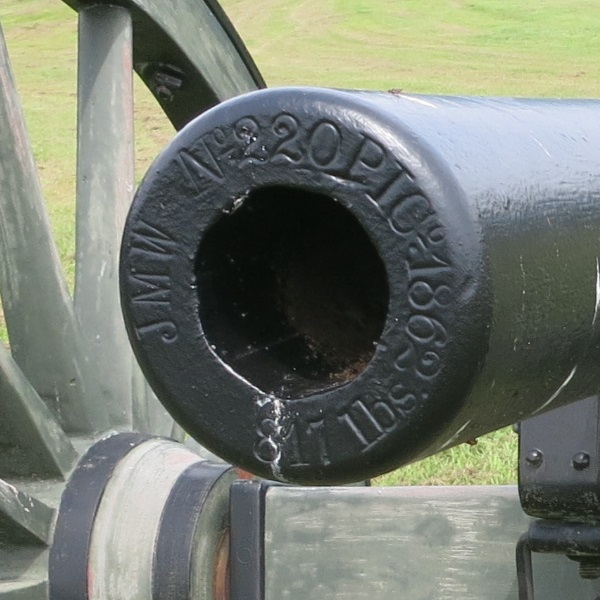
Muzzle shows "No.220 - PICo - 1862 - 817 lbs. - JMW". This represents registry number, Phoenix Iron Company, year produced, weight, and inspector (James M. Whittemore). Location is Fort Stedman, Petersburg National Battlefield.

The 3-inch ordnance rifle was mounted on the standard carriage for the 6-pounder field gun. Because its projectile was heavier than a 6-pound shot, the 3-inch rifle's greater recoil sometimes caused damage to the trail or the cheek pieces of the carriage. The 6-pounder carriage weighed 900 lb (408 kg). The 3-inch rifle fired case shot (shrapnel), time and percussion shell, and canister shot. The use of bolts (solid shot) was rare. Either Hotchkiss or Schenkl ammunition could be used. Parrott ammunition could be used in an emergency, but it performed poorly since it was designed for the 10-pounder Parrott gun which had only three grooves, rather than the ordnance rifle's seven grooves. For two reasons, canister shot fired from the 3-inch rifle was less effective than canister fired from a 12-pounder Napoleon or a M1841 12-pounder howitzer. First, its 3-inch bore was narrower than the 12-pounder's bore and could fire fewer canister balls. Second, the rifling of the barrel caused the canister to be thrown in an irregular pattern. For these reasons, Union General Henry Jackson Hunt believed that the 3-inch ordnance rifle's effective canister range was less than half that of the 12-pounder Napoleon's 400 yd (366 m) range.

Union batteries were generally organized with 6 guns of identical type, whether the 3-inch ordnance rifle or another type. At the Battle of Gettysburg on 1–3 July 1863, 50 of the 65 Union batteries numbered 6 guns and 64 of those batteries had guns of identical type. (Note: According to Cole, the only unit at Gettysburg with guns of mixed type was Sterling's 2nd Connecticut Light Artillery Battery (p. 56).) Each 6-gun battery required 14 six-horse teams and seven spare horses. The teams pulled the six artillery pieces and limbers, six caissons, one battery wagon, and one traveling forge. Each caisson carried two ammunition chests. The limber carried one additional ammunition chest. The 3-inch ordnance rifle carried 50 rounds in each ammunition chest. A memo from November 1863 stated that rifled guns ought to have 25 common shells, 20 spherical case shot (shrapnel), and five canister rounds in each ammunition chest. In March 1865, a memo recommended that each chest carry 30 common shells, 15 spherical case shot, and five canister rounds for rifled guns of the horse artillery. Each 6-horse team was controlled by three drivers and each gun crew was made up of nine artillerists.

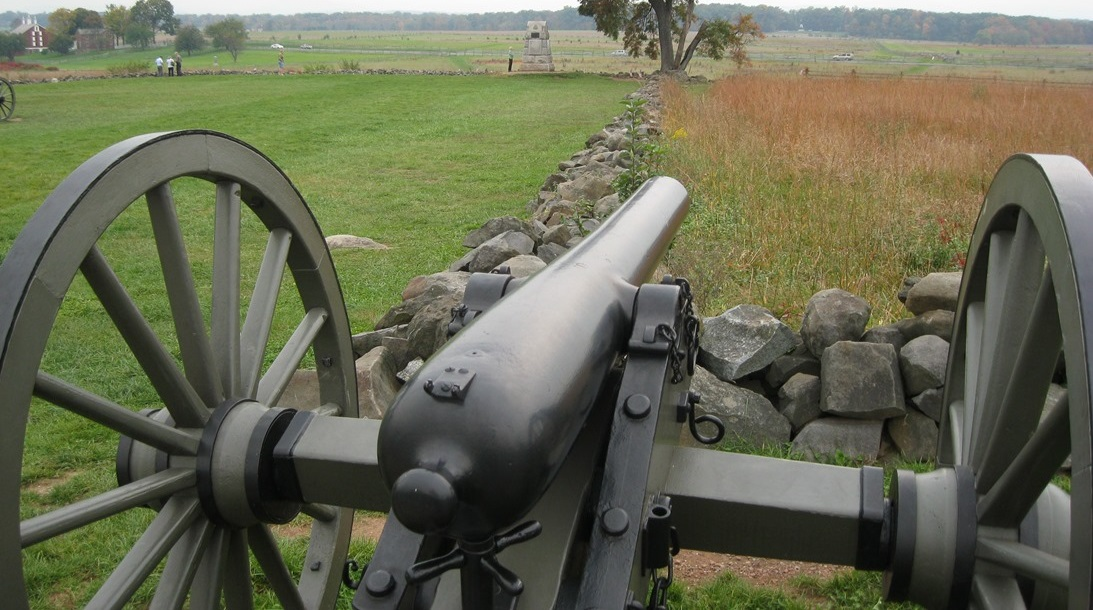
This 3-inch ordnance rifle overlooks "The Angle" – the target of Pickett's Charge – at Gettysburg National Military Park.

Model 1861 3-inch ordnance rifle specifications
Description	Dimension
Diameter of the bore (caliber)	3.0 in (7.62 cm)
Length of the bore	65.0 in (165.1 cm)
Length from the rear of the knob to the face of the muzzle	72.7 in (184.7 cm)
Length from the rear of the knob to the center of the trunnions	31.285 in (79.5 cm)
Length from the center of the trunnions to the face of the muzzle	41.415 in (105.2 cm)
Diameter of the trunnions	3.67 in (9.3 cm)
Thickness of metal at the muzzle	1.5 in (3.8 cm)
Thickness of metal at the vent	3.355 in (8.5 cm)

== History ==
Over 350 3-inch ordnance rifles still existed in 2004, many of them in National Military Parks. Guns with registry numbers from 1 to 235 do not have a patent stamp. Guns numbered from 236 to 543 were inspected between 20 February and 25 November 1862 and have the patent stamp "Patented Dec. 9, 1862" on the left trunnion. Hazlett, Olmstead, and Parks supposed that the guns in this second batch were warehoused until the patent date, then stamped. This may have occurred due to bureaucratic errors or because the federal government was not able to provide enough equipment to put the guns in the field. The actual reason is not known. Guns numbered 544 through 678 were inspected in 1863; guns 679 through 841 were inspected in 1864; guns 842 through 934 were inspected in 1865; and guns numbered 935 through 965 were inspected in 1866 and 1867.

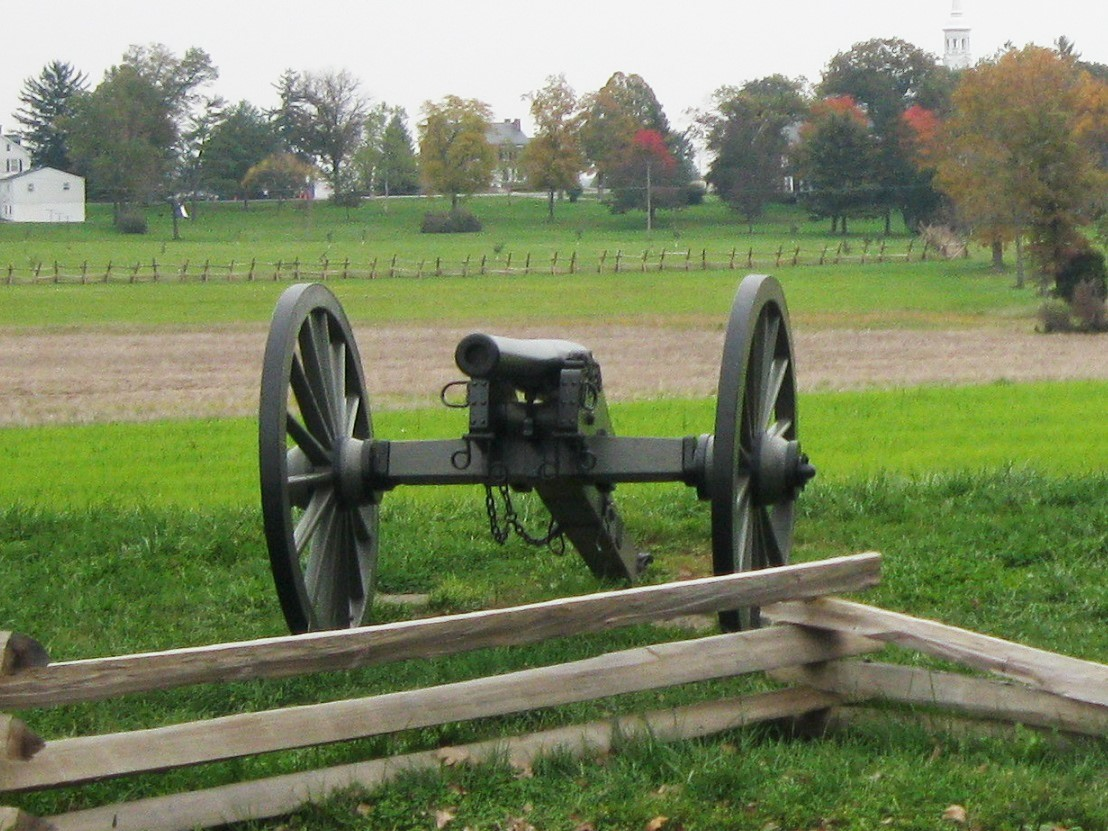
3-inch ordnance rifle, 1st NY Light Artillery, Company L at Gettysburg NMP

The 3-inch ordnance rifle proved to be extremely durable in action, with only one reported case of failure. During the Battle of the Wilderness on 5 May 1864, a 3-inch ordnance rifle in R. Bruce Ricketts's Battery F, 1st Pennsylvania Light Artillery blew its muzzle off when firing double-canister on the Plank Road. The damaged gun was buried near Todd's Tavern according to a letter Ricketts wrote in 1897. By 1864, the Parrott rifles were being phased out because they had a troubling propensity to burst in action. In addition, the 10-pounder Parrott was heavier than the 3-inch rifle. The 3-inch ordnance rifle was also capable of extraordinary accuracy. During one of the battles of the Atlanta campaign in 1864, a Confederate gunner in Lumsden's Alabama battery reported that one of his guns was placed in a fortification with an embrasure about one foot wide. Within a short time, three shells came through this opening from a 3-inch ordnance rifle without exploding. The first struck the gun between the trunnions and vent, gouging out some metal. The second damaged the left cheek of the gun carriage. The third struck the gun's muzzle, crushing it inward, making the gun impossible to load and putting it out of action.

At the Battle of Antietam on 17 September 1862, the number of 3-inch ordnance rifles used by the Union army was 81 out of a total of 301 artillery pieces; the Confederate army employed 42 (captured) out of a total of 241 guns. (Note: Johnson and Anderson listed 81 Union 3-inch ordnance rifles in Appendix C (p. 129), but the text listed a total of 85 in Union batteries (pp. 69–83).) Among the Union army batteries, the 3-inch ordnance rifle was distributed with one battery (Battery A, Maryland Light Artillery) having 8 guns, while most batteries had either 4 or 6 guns. On the Confederate side, the 3-inch ordnance rifles were allotted with one battery having 3, while all others had 1 or 2 per battery. While many 3-inch ordnance rifles survive, only four have a recorded history. The gun with registry number 1 served in Gilbert H. Reynolds's Battery L, 1st New York Light Artillery at the Battle of Gettysburg and was captured by the Confederates. It was recaptured at the Battle of Spottsylvania in May 1864. Gun number 100 served in Samuel Sherer Elder's Battery B, 1st U.S. Artillery and fired the last shot at the Battle of Appomattox Court House. Gun number 233 served in John H. Calef's Battery A, 2nd U.S. Artillery and fired the first shot at Gettysburg. Gun number 247 served in the same battery at Gettysburg.

The 3-inch ordnance rifle was utilized until the 1880s. In the years 1879–1881, six of these guns were re-bored to a caliber of 3.18 in (81 mm), re-rifled, converted to breechloaders, and renamed 3.2-inch Breechloading Rifles (Converted). The guns performed well in their new configuration and this experiment eventually led to the adoption of the 3.2-inch gun M1897. In 1903, more than 200 obsolete 3-inch ordnance rifles were converted to saluting guns.

== Civil War artillery ==
Characteristics of American Civil War artillery pieces
Description	Caliber	Tube length	Tube weight	Carriage weight	Shot weight	Charge weight	Range 5° elev.
M1841 6-pounder field gun	3.67 in (9.3 cm)	60 in (152 cm)	884 lb (401 kg)	900 lb (408 kg)	6.1 lb (2.8 kg)	1.25 lb (0.6 kg)	1,523 yd (1,393 m)
M1841 12-pounder field gun	4.62 in (11.7 cm)	78 in (198 cm)	1,757 lb (797 kg)	1,175 lb (533 kg)	12.3 lb (5.6 kg)	2.5 lb (1.1 kg)	1,663 yd (1,521 m)
M1841 12-pounder howitzer	4.62 in (11.7 cm)	53 in (135 cm)	788 lb (357 kg)	900 lb (408 kg)	8.9 lb (4.0 kg)	1.0 lb (0.5 kg)	1,072 yd (980 m)
M1841 24-pounder howitzer	5.82 in (14.8 cm)	65 in (165 cm)	1,318 lb (598 kg)	1,128 lb (512 kg)	18.4 lb (8.3 kg)	2.0 lb (0.9 kg)	1,322 yd (1,209 m)
M1857 12-pounder Napoleon	4.62 in (11.7 cm)	66 in (168 cm)	1,227 lb (557 kg)	1,128 lb (512 kg)	12.3 lb (5.6 kg)	2.5 lb (1.1 kg)	1,619 yd (1,480 m)
12-pounder James rifle	3.67 in (9.3 cm)	60 in (152 cm)	875 lb (397 kg)	900 lb (408 kg)	12 lb (5.4 kg)	0.75 lb (0.3 kg)	1,700 yd (1,554 m)
3-inch ordnance rifle	3.0 in (7.6 cm)	69 in (175 cm)	820 lb (372 kg)	900 lb (408 kg)	9.5 lb (4.3 kg)	1.0 lb (0.5 kg)	1,830 yd (1,673 m)
10-pounder Parrott rifle	3.0 in (7.6 cm)	74 in (188 cm)	899 lb (408 kg)	900 lb (408 kg)	9.5 lb (4.3 kg)	1.0 lb (0.5 kg)	1,900 yd (1,737 m)
20-pounder Parrott rifle	3.67 in (9.3 cm)	84 in (213 cm)	1,750 lb (794 kg)	1,175 lb (533 kg)	20 lb (9.1 kg)	2.0 lb (0.9 kg)	1,900 yd (1,737 m)

== Notes ==
Footnotes

Citations
