= Cyrus Alger =

American arms manufacturer and inventor (1781–1856)

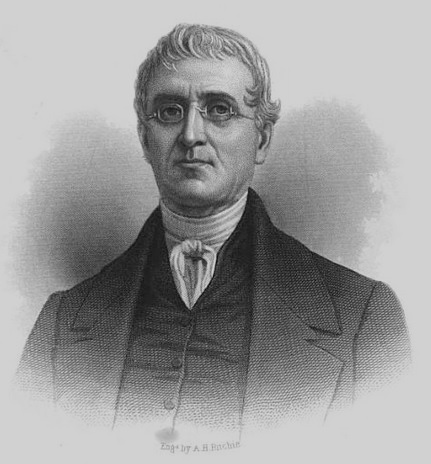
- Born: November 11, 1782; West Bridgewater, Massachusetts
- Died: February 4, 1856 (aged 73); Boston, Massachusetts
- Occupation: Metallurgist
- Known for: “Columbiad”
- Spouses: Lucy Wills (1st); Mary Otis Pittsbury (2nd)

Cyrus Alger (November 11, 1782 – February 4, 1856) was a United States arms manufacturer and inventor.

== Biography ==
He was born between Hephzibah Keith and Abiezer Alger on November 11, 1782, in West Bridgewater, Massachusetts. Early in life Alger became an iron founder, training in one of his father's three foundries in the Boston area, in Easton, Massachusetts. In 1809, he worked with Thomas Handasyd Perkins, likely tied to Perkins's interest in the Monkton Iron Works in Vergennes, Vermont. Initially Monkton aimed to provide iron to American consumers while the Embargo stymied foreign competition. While the Embargo's end threatened business, the War of 1812 created a new market for Monkton. The company supplied the American government with large numbers of cannon balls as well as iron to join the timbers in constructing frigates.

In 1817 Alger incorporated the South Boston Iron Company in Dorchester, Massachusetts. Through his firm's success, the region became a hub for iron manufacturing.

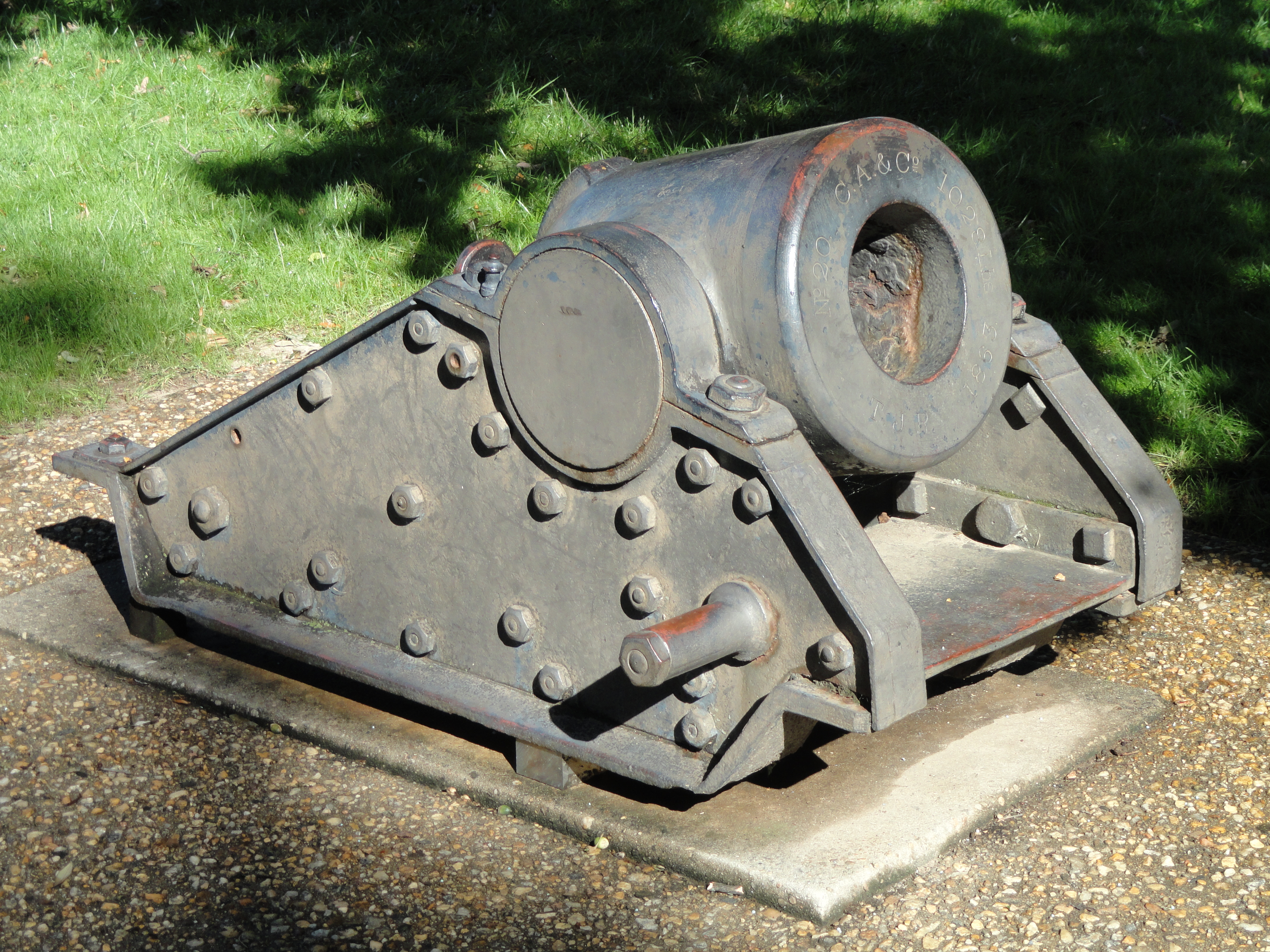
Cyrus Alger & Co. No. 20 mortar

Alger was one of the best practical metallurgists of his time. His numerous patents of improved processes show a continued advance in the art. The first gun ever rifled in America was made at his works in 1834, and the first perfect bronze cannon was made at his foundry for the U. S. ordnance department, The mortar “Columbiad,” the largest gun of cast iron that had then been made in the United States, was cast under his personal supervision.

Alger also devised numerous improvements in the construction of time fuses for bomb shells and grenades. In 1811 he patented a method of making cast-iron chilled rolls, and in 1822 first designed cylinder stoves. Alger served as a member of the city council during the first year of its existence, and was elected alderman in 1824 and 1827.

He died on February 4, 1856, in Boston, Massachusetts. He is buried at the Mount Auburn Cemetery with his family.

== See also ==
- Field artillery in the American Civil War
- Siege artillery in the American Civil War
- Francis Alger, his son.
