= 91st Illinois Infantry Regiment =

91st Regiment Illinois Volunteer Infantry
- Illinois state flag
- Active: September 8, 1862, to June 28, 1865
- Country: United States
- Allegiance: Union
- Branch: Infantry

The 91st Regiment Illinois Volunteer Infantry was an infantry regiment that served in the Union Army during the American Civil War.

== Service ==
The regiment was organized at Camp Butler, Illinois, in August 1862, by Col. Henry M. Day, and was mustered on September 8, 1862. Armed with smoothbore, .69 -caliber Springfield Model 1816s altered from flint-lock to percussion, the 91st Illinois left the state October 1, for the front, and arrived at Shepherdsville, KY, on Tuesday, October 7.

=== Initial operations, surrender, and parole ===
The regiment was assigned to the Department of the Ohio's Railroad Guard to counter Confederate partisan and cavalry attacks on the Louisville and Nashville Railroad (L&NRR). Its primary opponent from October through December was Brig. Gen. John Hunt Morgan's regular and irregular cavalry. (Note: Morgan was responsible for tying down large numbers of U.S. troops in the Department of the Ohio with a mix of regular and irregular cavlary. His raids on Rosecrans' supply lines in December 1862 and January 1863, most notably his victory at the Battle of Hartsville on December 7., eventually earned him the thanks of the Confederate Congress on May 1, 1863. These actions had two effects on Rosecrans' actions; they delayed the launch of his spring offensive aimed at Chattanooga and the center of the Confederacy and spurred Rosecrans to beef up his cavalry with repeating weapons and create several mounted infantry regiment asking for authorization to purchase or issue enough tack to outfit 5,000 mounted infantry. For more information, see his Wikipedia article.)

On Saturday morning, December 27, 1862, the recently married Morgan arrived in force at Elizabethtown, KY, where the 91st was then stationed behind fortifications, under Lieut. Col. Harry S. Smith. Morgan had captured the regiment's three detached companies guarding the railroad at Nolin Station and Bacon Creek on Friday. Morgan and Smith sent notes to each other demanding each other's surrender. At an impasse at 1:30 P.M., Morgan's artillery batteries began bombarding the remaining seven companies and his cavalry opened up with their musketry. Soon, the inferiority of the smoothbore muskets, exhaustion of the ammunition, and Morgan's superior numbers, caused Smith to sue for surrender. Morgan paroled the regiment after taking their arms. (Note: Due to their parole, the 91st reported no arms in the Department of Ohio's Ordnance Return for the 4th Quarter of 1862.) The regiment's loss was seven killed, and several wounded, some of whom died of their wounds. As they were paroled, they noted that the rebel loss in killed and wounded exceeded 200.

On Sunday, December 28, the 91st took the route step for Louisville, KY, where all the well men took the Mobile and Ohio Railroad (M&ORR) to Columbus, KY. There they took steamboats across the Ohio River to Cairo, IL and then rode the Illinois Central Railroad for St. Louis, MO. Only seven men reached St. Louis, and reported at Benton Barracks on Thursday, January 1, 1863. The remainder of the regiment interpreted their parole as license to go home and abandoned the train at points along the line in Illinois. Most of the officers got as far as East St. Louis before they went home. About two-thirds of the Regiment answered at roll-call at Benton Barracks on Saturday, February 28, 1863, to muster for six months pay. From then until Friday, June 5, all but a few reported back to the regiment's headquarters at Benton Barracks. On that day, the regiment's was exchanged and cleared for operations.

=== Return to active duty ===
As a result of the exchange, the men were re-equipped, resupplied, and re-armed .69-caliber M1842 muskets that had been rifled at St. Louis Arsenal (Note: In March of 1855, the army ordered both Springfield and Harper's Ferry National Arsenals (NA) to begin rifling M1842 muskets, adding long-range rear sights, and recessing ramrod tips to handle conical profile .69-caliber Minié pattern ammunition. In addition to the two NAs, the Saint Louis, MO, Frankford, PA, and Benicia, CA Arsenals were ordered to alter the M1842s in their stocks the same way.) With their new arms, equipment and supplies, the men of the 91st began at once training and drilling. While in St Louis, they were reassigned from the Department of the Ohio, soon to be the Army of the Cumberland, to the Department of the Missouri. During this tenure, the three victorious U.S. campaigns of Gettysburg, Tullahoma, and Vicksburg occurred.

On Wednesday, July 8, the Regiment mustered and received four months pay. Reassigned to the Army of the Tennessee, fresh off its victory at Vicksburg, the 91st Illinois alongside 29th Illinois, embarked on the steamboat Nebraska that afternoon. The boat cast off from St. Louis, steamed down the Mississippi, and disembarked at Vicksburg, a week later, at 7 p.m. on July 15. Once there, the regiment was assigned to the 2nd Brigade, Maj. Gen. Herron's 2nd Division, in Maj. Gen. Ord's XIII Corps. (Note: After returning from Sherman's defeating Gen. Johnston, XIII Corps reorganized by consolidating two of its three divisions into and adding Herron's division from XV Corps.) With its new command, the 91st Illinois suffered heavy losses in effective men due to bad drinking water. (Note: Unbeknownst to the regiment, their water sources had been contaminated by the decomposition of hastily buried dead of the recent Siege of Vicksburg.) To support Maj. Gen. Banks' Army of the Gulf's plans to extend the blockade around the Confederacy by sealing the border with Mexico, Grant had Sherman detach Ord and ordered XIII Corps to join Banks at Port Hudson. The corps left Vicksburg, Friday, July 24, arriving at Port Hudson on Saturday. While there, the 91st Illinois patrolled and scouted the surrounding country reasserting federal control.

On Thursday, August 13, Banks began moving his army back to New Orleans, LA, to continue regaining U.S. control of the Gulf Coast. The 91st Illinois remained at New Orleans until Saturday, September 5, when Herron's division detached from XIII Corps. The division took steamers up the river, landing at Morganzia Bend on Sunday midday. Monday morning, September 7, the 91st, 94th Illinois, 20th Wisconsin, and a battalion of the 2nd Illinois Cavalry, with two cannons, started west for the Atchafalaya River. About sundown they made contact with the enemy but were rebuffed and fell back six miles. Regrouping, the force attacked again on Tuesday, driving the enemy across the river taking 200 prisoners. With the rebels driven out of the area, on Wednesday, the 91st Illinois fell back to the Mississippi, and on Friday, September 10, to take possession of Morganzia, LA.

The regiment remained in garrison at Morganzia a month, and on Saturday, October 10, the 91st Illinois boarded steam transports for New Orleans. Arriving there the next day, the regiment turned in their M1842 rifled-muskets and received new .577-caliber Pattern 1853 Enfield rifled-muskets. The 91st Illinois was assigned to the Brig. Gen. Vandever's 1st Brigade, (Note: The 91st Illinois' brigade mates were the 37th Illinois 26th Indiana, 34th and 38th Iowa infantry regiments, Its attached artillery was Batteries E and F, 1st Missouri Light Artillery.) of Maj. Gen. Dana's 2nd Division, XIII Corps, (Note: Dana commanded both XIII Corps and its 2nd Division.) in Banks' Army of the Gulf. General Vandever commanding. For the next ten days, the regiment was on duty as patrolling New Orleans and its environs.

==== South Texas Expedition ====
In the fall of 1863, the Union wanted to shut down the last holdouts on the Texas coast. Banks would send his XIX Corps under the Antietam veteran Maj. Gen. William B. Franklin to take the Sabine Pass at the Luisianna-Texas state line. (Note: The Sabine River, used by blockade runners, ran into the Gulf of Mexico from the natural shallow-water harbor Sabine Lake upstream from the Gulf about 6 miles (9.6 km) where a railroad connected to Beaumont. Franklin aimed to seize "Fort Sabine" at Sabine Pass about 2 miles (3.2 km) upstream of the river mouth. An earlier Navy attempt at the First Battle of Sabine Pass failed, so his battle plan was to land a small force to take the fort and establish a beachead for a main force of 5,000 U.S. Army regulars. The fort proved resistant to the naval bombardment and the rebels captured two assault vessels, inflicted 350 casualties, and captured 315 sailors.)

Meanwhile, at the other end of the Texas coast, Banks and his XIII Corps would shut the port at the Corpus Christi/Brownsville area at the mouth of the Rio Grande. Another issue for seizing Brownsville was the U.S. government was also anxious to show Union presence along the Mexican border since the French Army had just invaded Mexico and installed Maximillian, and there was an increasing tension and hostility with the French and Imperial Mexican forces. The Union planned to shut down the port and at the same time give a boost to Juárez. Here, Confederate forces, under Brig. Gen. Bee consisted of only four companies from the 33rd Texas Cavalry under Col. James Duff and another two companies of three-month volunteers. All other Confederates along the coast had been called elsewhere in the wake of Franklin's failed attack. The total Confederate force amounted to roughly 150 men stationed at Fort Brown.

On Friday, October 23, the 91st's division sailed for Texas, via Mississippi River and Gulf of Mexico. The expeditionary force and its small fleet of steamer transports and towed sailing supply vessels arrived at the mouth of the Rio Grande shortly after noon, November 1, 1863. On Tuesday November 3, the 91st landed at Point Isabell. On November 4 after unloading all necessary arms, supplies, and equipment, the XIII Corps moved west to Clarksville at the mouth of the Rio Grande. On Friday, Dana's 2nd Division started for Brownsville, Texas, skirmishing all the way with Bee's troops

===== Battle of Brownsville =====
Vandever's 1st Brigade followed Col. Dye's 2nd Brigade (Note: This brigade consisted of the 94th Illinois, 19th and 20th Iowa, 13th Maine, and 20th Wisconsin infantry regiments. Its artillery was Battery B, 1st Missouri Light Artillery. The division's remaining attached troops were the 15th Maine Infantry, 1st Engineers, Corps D'Afrique (an African-American unit), 16th Infantry, Corps D'Afrique, a Pioneer Company, and the German-American 1st Texas Cavalry.) as it led the advance up the river on Brownsville. The 1st Texas Cavalry screened the force as it advanced. (Note: This regiment of German and Tejano Unionists were recruited from survivors of the Nueces massacre and other Hill Country Germans and Tejanos who had made their escape to New Orleans. They were now facing the same James Duff who had imposed martial law in Gillespie County, arrested, and executed two Germans. Duff had also sent Lieutenant Colin McRae who had committed the massacre. For more information see the Wikipedia article here.)

After chasing off Duff's cavalry, Dye's men entered the Brownsville around 10:00 a.m., on November 6, 1863. As the Union forces spread out through the city. General Bee quickly ordered the evacuation of the city and abandoned Fort Brown. He personally supervised the burning of what military supplies and cotton he could. Inside the fort was 8,000 pounds (3,600 kg) of condemned explosives which caused a great explosion much to the terror of the local citizens. The Confederates' destruction spread into the city while the soldiers resorted to looting prompting the local citizens into a degree of opposition. A local resident by the name of General José Maria Cobos was a Mexican general and refugee living in exile due to the recent French invasion. General Cobos received permission from the civilian authorities in Brownsville to organize a force to resist the looters and subdue the fires started by the Confederate evacuation. Around noon General Banks personally arrived in the city and by 4:00 pm the remaining Union forces arrived. Colonel Dye was put in command of the post and the Union army encamped in the city, the army barracks at Fort Brown having been destroyed. The Union forces also captured a large supply of cotton left behind by the Confederates.

===== Chaos in Matamoros =====
Shortly after helping stop the looting and the fires in Brownsville, General Cobos led a force across the river and seized Matamoros. Banks was in communication with Secretary of State William Seward and keeping Washington informed of the political situation in Mexico. The French had sought and received Confederate support while aiding the Confederacy when and where they could. The Union consistent with its desire to preserve its republic supported the Republicans under Juarez. Cobos while no friend of the Hapsburgs nor French was also a conservative reactionary who denounced Juarez as a demagogue. Cobos had received the support of the local bandit chieftain, Cortina to take power, but they fell out the next day and Cortina executed Cobos.

The 19th Illinois and other men of XIII Corps were witness to this chaos across the river and were kept on alert during the remainder of their stay in Brownsville. Banks took the unoccupied Fort Brown on Monday November 9.

The regiment was mustered out on June 12, 1865, and discharged at Chicago, Illinois, on June 28, 1865.

== Total strength and casualties ==
The regiment suffered 12 enlisted men who were killed in action or who died of their wounds and 1 officer and 131 enlisted men who died of disease, for a total of 144 fatalities.

== Commanders ==
- Colonel Henry M. Day - Mustered out with the regiment.

== See also ==
- List of Illinois Civil War Units
- Illinois in the American Civil War
