= Francis S. Hesseltine =

American Civil War Medal of Honor recipient

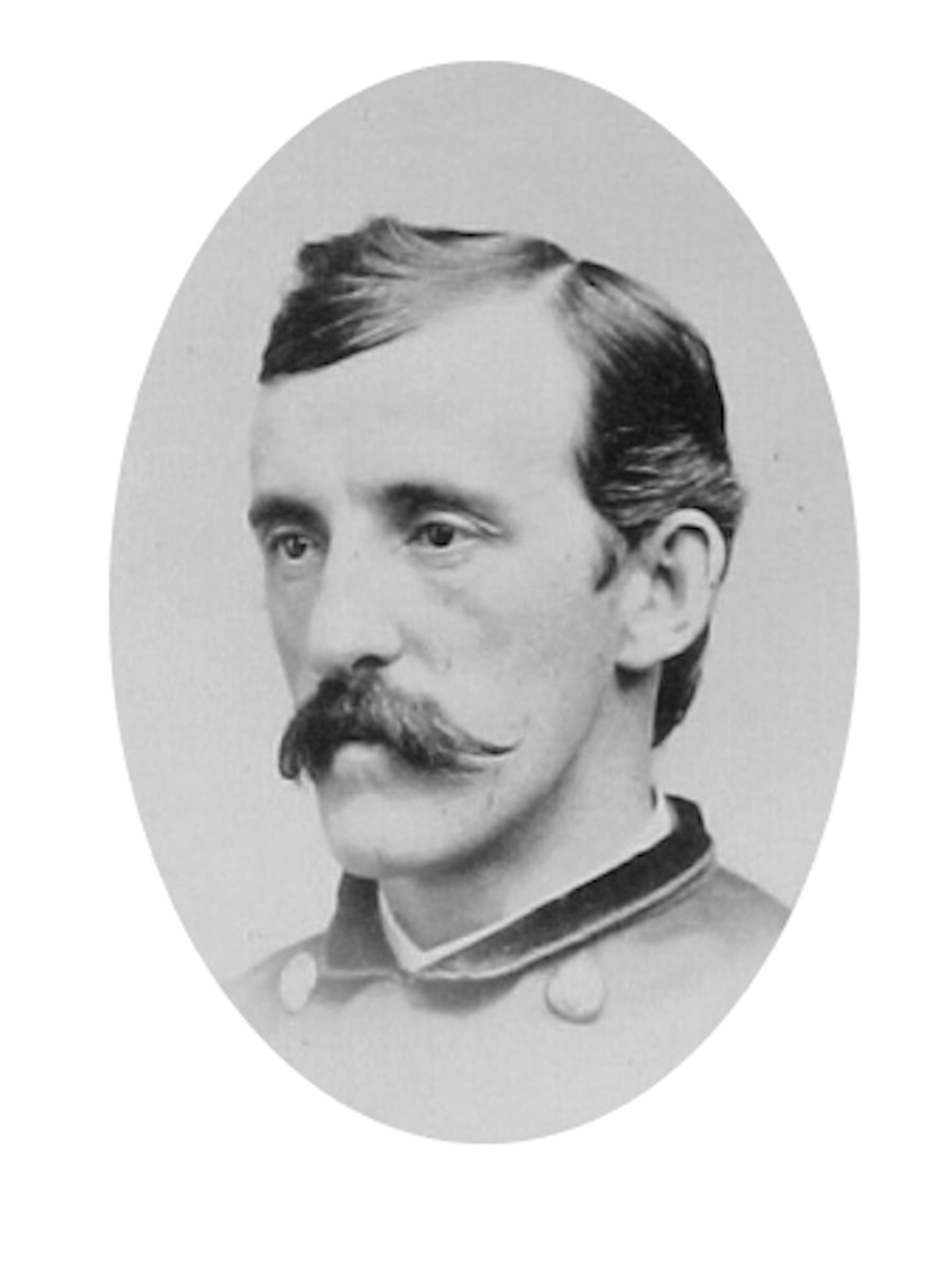
- Hesseltine in 1864
- Born: December 10, 1833; Bangor, Maine
- Died: February 17, 1916 (aged 82)
- Burial place: Melrose, Massachusetts
- Military career
- Allegiance: United States
- Branch: United States Army
- Rank: Lieutenant Colonel
- Unit: 13th Maine Volunteer Infantry Regiment
- Conflicts: American Civil War
- Awards: Medal of Honor

Francis Snow Hesseltine (December 10, 1833 – February 17, 1916) was a Union Army soldier in the American Civil War who received the U.S. military's highest decoration, the Medal of Honor for extraordinary heroism on December 30, 1863, while serving as the lieutenant colonel of the 13th Maine Volunteer Infantry Regiment, at Matagorda Bay, Texas. His Medal of Honor was issued on March 2, 1895.

== Early life ==
Francis Hesseltine was born in Bangor, Maine, in 1833 and educated at Colby College in Waterville. While a student at Colby, he was the first citizen of Waterville to volunteer to serve in the Union Army. The sophomore student was elected captain of a company in the 3rd Maine Volunteer Infantry Regiment, a unit made up almost entirely of college students. Had the war not intervened, Hesseltine would have graduated from Colby in June 1863.

== Civil War service ==
By February 1862 Hesseltine was a lieutenant colonel in the Thirteenth Maine Regiment. The regiment was sent to Ship Island, Mississippi, where he was given command of Fort Jackson and Fort St. Philip, which were located 70 miles south of New Orleans, and protected the approaches to the city.

In October 1863 concerns about Mexico possibly entering the war allied with the Confederacy caused the Thirteenth Maine to be shipped to Brownsville, Texas, at the mouth of the Rio Grande River.

== Medal of Honor action ==
In late December 1863 Hesseltine led a detachment of 100 men in a reconnaissance of the Matagorda peninsula, which covered the approach to the harbor of Corpus Christi, Texas. On December 28, a regiment of 1,000 Confederate cavalrymen discovered his reconnaissance detachment and attacked Hesseltine's command.

On the 28th, seven miles from the head of Matagorda peninsula all contact was cut off with the transport ship which could evacuate Hesseltine's force due to heavy surf. The enemy was at his rear and he was, effectively, surrounded.

In Hesseltine's own words, "Soon, by the aid of my glass, I was able to discern the head of a body of cavalry moving down the peninsula … their line stretched steadily towards us … in half an hour their skirmishers were swarming up close to mine, slightly heeding the shall and shrapnel … half our skirmishers faced about and gave them a volley … I knew my men. They were cool; and determined rather than the rebels should meet the first encouragement of this campaign, that they would die there."

As of 3 p.m. on the third day, Hesseltine had located his transport ship, and his unit boarded without loss of lives or equipment. The 100 infantrymen from Maine had inflicted significant casualties on the 1,000 Confederate cavalrymen and sank their gunboat.

== Post war ==
After the war, Hesseltine studied law in Portland, then moved to Savannah, Georgia, and lived there until 1870, when he opened a law practice in Boston with his son. He then moved to Melrose, Massachusetts, residing at 45 West Emerson Street. He became involved in the public life of the growing town.

He became active in political and public endeavors, serving on the building committee for town hall, helping fund the Melrose Improvement Society. The Melrose Improvement Society planted over 3,000 trees and cleared the town common. In 1891, he served on the oversight committee for the building of two new schools (Livermore and Winthrop) and the addition to the high school. In 1892 he was on the committee to study the establishment of public sewerage. In 1895, he served on the committee to study the change from town to city government. He presided at the municipal memorial service for President Grant. He also served on the commission formed to pay pensions (with city funds) to Melrose's Civil War veterans.

Hesseltine was active in Republican party politics and in 1884 was Melrose campaign coordinator for Maine Governor James G. Blaine, in his unsuccessful presidential campaign against Grover Cleveland. He ran for Mayor in 1902 but was defeated.

In 1912, Hesseltine was awarded an honorary doctorate by his alma mater, Colby College.

He is one of eight Medal of Honor recipients to be a member of the Ancient and Honorable Artillery Company of Massachusetts. He was also a member of the Massachusetts Commandery of the Military Order of the Loyal Legion of the United States and the Grand Army of the Republic.

He died at the age of 82, on February 17, 1916, and was buried at the Wyoming Cemetery in Melrose.

== Medal of Honor citation ==
The President of the United States of America, in the name of Congress, takes pleasure in presenting the Medal of Honor to Lieutenant Colonel Francis Snow Hesseltine, United States Army, for extraordinary heroism on 30 December 1863, while serving with 13th Maine Infantry, in action at Matagorda Bay, Texas. In command of a detachment of 100 men, Lieutenant Colonel Hesseltine conducted a reconnaissance for two days, baffling and beating back an attacking force of more than a thousand Confederate cavalry, and regained his transport without loss.

== See also ==
- 13th Maine Volunteer Infantry Regiment
- Department of the Gulf
- Battle of Brownsville
- Battle of Mustang Island
- Battle of Fort Esperanza
- Red River Campaign
