= Battle of Fort Esperanza =

Battle of the American Civil War

Coordinates: 28.3720°N 96.4075°W

- Part of the Trans-Mississippi Theater of the American Civil War
Date	November 27–30, 1863
Location	Cedar Bayou and Matagorda Island, Texas
Result	Union victory

Belligerents
United States (Union)	(Confederate States of America) CSA (Confederacy)

Commanders and leaders
Cadwallader C. Washburn	William R. Bradfute

Strength
1st Brigade, 1st Division, XIII Corps - Colonel Henry D. Washburn: 8th Indiana Infantry; 18th Indiana Infantry; 33rd Illinois Infantry; 99th Illinois Infantry; Battery G, 1st Mich.; 23rd Iowa Infantry attached from 2nd Brigade, 1st Division, XIII Corps; 2nd Brigade, 2nd Division, XIII Corps - Brig. General Thomas E.G. Ransom: 34th Iowa Infantry; 13th Maine Infantry; 15th Maine Infantry; Battery F, 1st Mo.	Detachments from: 8th Texas Infantry Regiment; 5th Texas Militia

Casualties and losses
1 killed 10 wounded	1 killed 10 captured

The Battle of Fort Esperanza (November 27–30, 1863) was fought in Texas during the American Civil War. Maj. Gen. Cadwallader C. Washburn led two brigades from the Union XIII Corps to capture a fort on Matagorda Island defended by Colonel William R. Bradfute and a small Confederate garrison. After some skirmishing, the Confederates evacuated the fort. Casualties were light on both sides.

== Background ==
Following the engagements of Brownsville and Mustang Island, a Union expedition led by C. C. Washburn continued up the Texas coast toward Matagorda Island. On the north end of Matagorda Island lay Fort Esperanza commanded by Colonel William R. Bradfute with a garrison of detachments from his own 8th Texas Infantry Regiment and the 5th Texas Militia regiment as well as a few local militiamen from the area.

== Action ==
Leading General Washburn's expedition was Brig. Gen. Thomas E. G. Ransom’s Federal brigade. On November 23 Ransom’s men had difficulty crossing Cedar Bayou due to light skirmishing and bad weather but once across they encamped to wait for the next Federal brigade under Colonel Henry D. Washburn to cross. On November 27 General Washburn arrived on the scene and ordered Ransom’s brigade up the center of the island while Colonel Washburn’s brigade moved on a parallel route along the coast. Washburn’s brigade reached Fort Esperanza first. The Federals encountered pickets from the 8th Texas Infantry who retreated within the fortification after a brief reconnoitering skirmish. Bad weather limited activity on November 28 to minor skirmishing and occasional artillery fire which produced no results for either side. On November 29 with Ransom’s brigade in place two Union batteries opened the fight with an artillery bombardment. Union infantry then drove in the Texas infantry from the exterior rifle pits while artillery continued with great accuracy against the Confederate defenses. Colonel Bradfute held a council of war that evening and decided to abandon the fort. Shortly after midnight on November 30 Bradfute’s men detonated the fort’s magazines, spiked the cannon and withdrew. The explosion signaled the Confederates’ evacuation and the Union force entered the fort only to realize the Confederate had already withdrawn. Two Indiana regiments were ordered to pursue the retreating garrison but managed only to capture an artillery piece used to guard the crossing point. Though much of the artillery and ammunition was destroyed, Washburn's expedition succeeded in capturing the fort and found much needed supplies left behind. The Confederate suffered one killed and 10 captured while the Union soldiers suffered one killed and 10 wounded.
