= 33rd Illinois Infantry Regiment =

Union infantry regiment during the Civil War

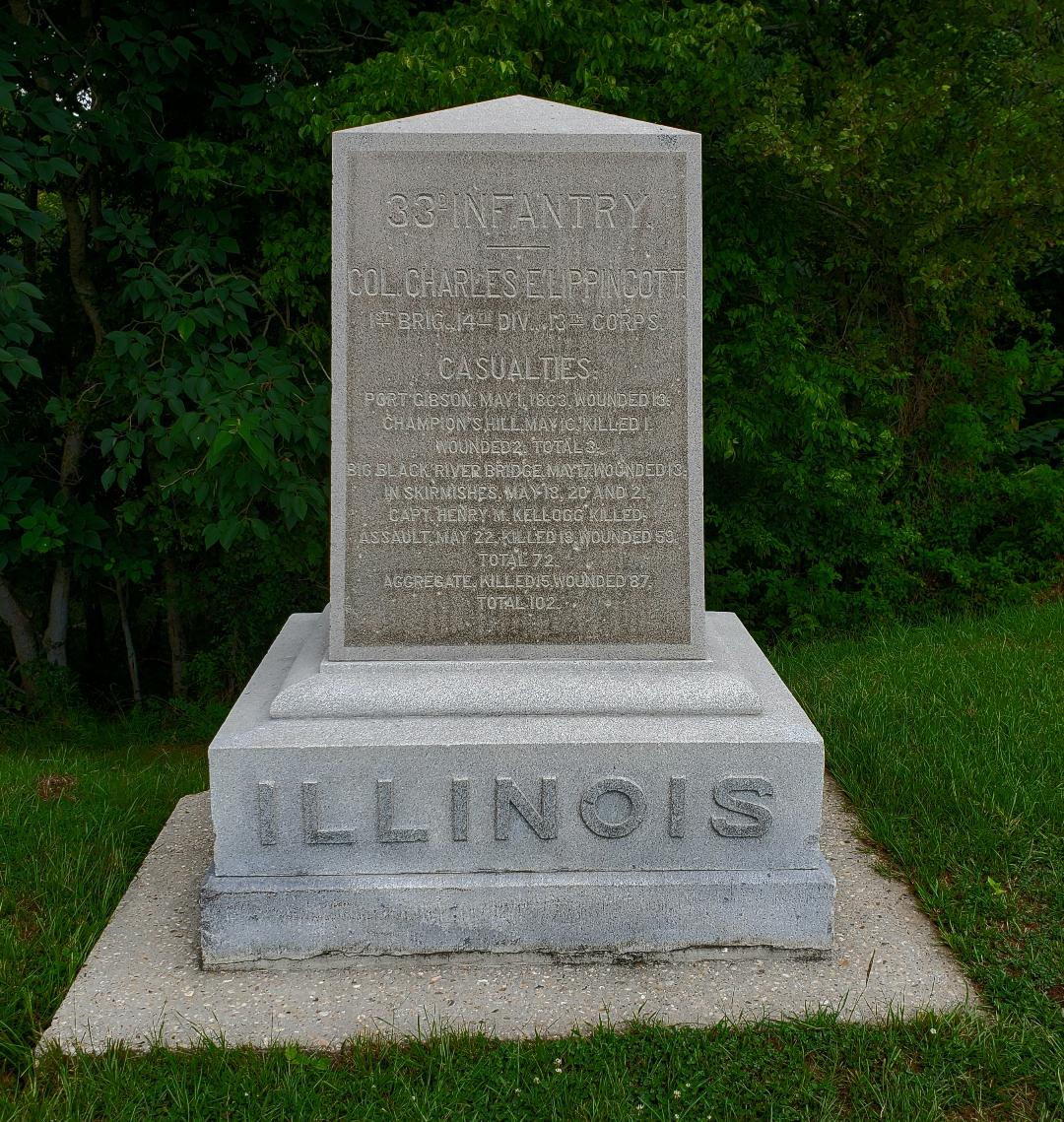
- Monument to the 33rd Illinois is located at Vicksburg National Military Park near the Iowa state monument and across the ravine from the Railroad Redoubt.
- Active: 3 Sept. 1861 – 6 December 1865
- Country: United States
- Allegiance: (United States) Union; Illinois
- Branch: Union Army
- Type: Infantry
- Size: Regiment
- Nickname: Teacher's Regiment
- Engagements: Engagement at Fredericktown; Battle of Cotton Plant; Battle of Port Gibson; Battle of Champion Hill; Battle of Big Black River; Siege of Vicksburg; Jackson Expedition; Battle of Brownsville; Battle of Fort Esperanza; Battle of Spanish Fort

Commanders
- Notable commanders: Charles Edward Hovey: Charles E. Lippincott; Isaac H. Elliott

The 33rd Illinois Infantry Regiment (nicknamed the Teacher's Regiment) was an infantry regiment from Illinois that served in the Union Army during the American Civil War. A number of the soldiers were college students and graduates, and for a time the regiment included a 17-piece band. The unit fought at Fredericktown in 1861, Cotton Plant in 1862, the Vicksburg campaign and Fort Esperanza in 1863, and at Spanish Fort in 1865. The original enlistees were mustered out in October 1864 while the veterans and recruits were mustered out in December 1865.

== Formation ==
The 33rd Illinois Infantry was originally formed from many college students on the campus of the Illinois State Normal School and became known as the "Teacher's Regiment". In one company there were 13 college graduates and all were privates. The soldiers were so well educated that the standard joke was that men discharged for mental incapacity would have made officers in other regiments. The unit formally organized between 15 August and 29 September 1861 at Camp Butler near Springfield, Illinois, and mustered into federal service on 3 September 1861.

The original field officers were Colonel Charles Edward Hovey of Bloomington, Lieutenant Colonel William R. Lockwood of Quincy, and Major Edward R. Roe of Bloomington. After Lockwood's resignation, Charles E. Lippincott of Chandlerville was promoted lieutenant colonel on 1 March 1862. After Hovey was promoted brigadier general on 5 September 1862, Lippincott was promoted colonel and Roe was promoted lieutenant colonel. Roe resigned on 29 May 1863 and was replaced as lieutenant colonel by Leander H. Potter of Bloomington. Potter resigned on 12 September 1864 and was replaced by Isaac H. Elliott of Princeton. Lippincott resigned on 10 September 1865 and Elliott briefly became colonel before the regiment was discharged. At discharge, Henry H. Pope of Taylorville was lieutenant colonel and Elijah H. Gray of Winchester was major.

The regiment enlisted a 17-piece band whose members served the unit by playing music on the battlefield as well as off. The band was led by C. S. Elder and Augustus Woodward, both from Lexington. Its initial public performance took place at the Normal School in August 1861. Aside from Elder, the band included three First Class, four Second Class, and nine Third Class musicians. The band members mustered out on 16 August 1862 after serving one year.

== Service ==
=== Missouri–Arkansas ===
On 20 September 1861, the 33rd Illinois Infantry moved to Ironton, Missouri, where it was based until March 1862. During this period, the regiment was attached to the Department of Missouri and took part in an expedition which resulted a skirmish at Big River Bridge near Potosi on 15 October and the Engagement at Fredericktown on 21 October. The men became hardened to warfare by fights with Confederate partisans. In one struggle, Lippincott stabbed an enemy officer in the ribs with his sword and then, grabbing the Confederate's pistol, shot him in the back. The 33rd Illinois was assigned to the 2nd Brigade, Army of Southeast Missouri in March–May 1862. Under the overall command of Brigadier General Frederick Steele, the regiment marched to Batesville, Arkansas, on 5 April–3 May. At Batesville, Steele's column joined the Army of the Southwest under Major General Samuel Ryan Curtis and the 33rd Illinois was reassigned to the 1st Division in Curtis' army in May–July 1862.

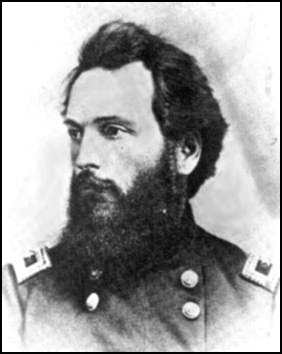
Charles E. Hovey

Facing a supply shortage, Curtis marched south along the White River in an attempt to make contact with a Union fleet. While crossing the Cache River on 7 July 1862, Curtis sent Hovey with 400 soldiers to make a reconnaissance. Hovey's force included one cannon and four companies each of the 33rd Illinois and the 11th Wisconsin Infantry Regiments. The Battle of Cotton Plant (Hill's Plantation) began when the 11th Wisconsin began skirmishing with 1,000 Confederates from the 12th Texas and 16th Texas Cavalry Regiments led by Colonel William H. Parsons. As the Wisconsin troops began to fall back, Hovey ordered three companies of the 33rd Illinois to take cover in a cornfield. When the Confederate horsemen galloped after the retreating Federals, the Illinois soldiers opened fire from ambush, routing Parsons' cavalry. Later, 200 Union cavalry and two artillery pieces arrived as reinforcements and Hovey's troops began pressing back their adversaries. After Brigadier General William Plummer Benton's Union brigade arrived, the Confederates retreated rapidly. During the battle, Edward M. Pike of the 33rd Illinois earned the Medal of Honor for saving a cannon from falling into enemy hands. After failing to make contact with the Union fleet, Curtis occupied Helena, Arkansas.

The 33rd Illinois was on duty near Helena until 1 September 1862, including being in action at Totten's Plantation on 2 August. The regiment was assigned to the 1st Division, District of Eastern Arkansas in July–November 1862. The unit skirmished at Bolivar Township in Poinsett County, Arkansas, on 24 September and Friars Point, Mississippi, on 28 September. The regiment was assigned to the 1st Brigade, 1st Division, Army of Southeast Missouri in November 1862 – March 1863. It marched first to Pilot Knob, Missouri, and arrived at Van Buren, Missouri on 15 November. (Note: Reece and Dyer both wrote Van Buren, Arkansas, but that town is 350 miles southwest and was occupied by Confederates on 15 November. This was probably a mistake for Van Buren, Missouri, which is 60 miles south of Pilot Knob.) As part of a column under Benton, the regiment made a winter campaign in southeast Missouri, ending at Pilot Knob on 1 March 1863. A soldier from the 33rd Illinois wrote that their brigade commander Benton lacked the proper qualities to be a general, and that the most courageous thing the man had ever done was to marry a woman after a 10-day courtship. A poignant reminder of these soldiers' lives includes an entry by Frank Adams in his diary in which he described Captain McKenzie's wife, who came to visit camp on March 4, 1863, as an "exceedingly beautiful woman."

=== Vicksburg ===
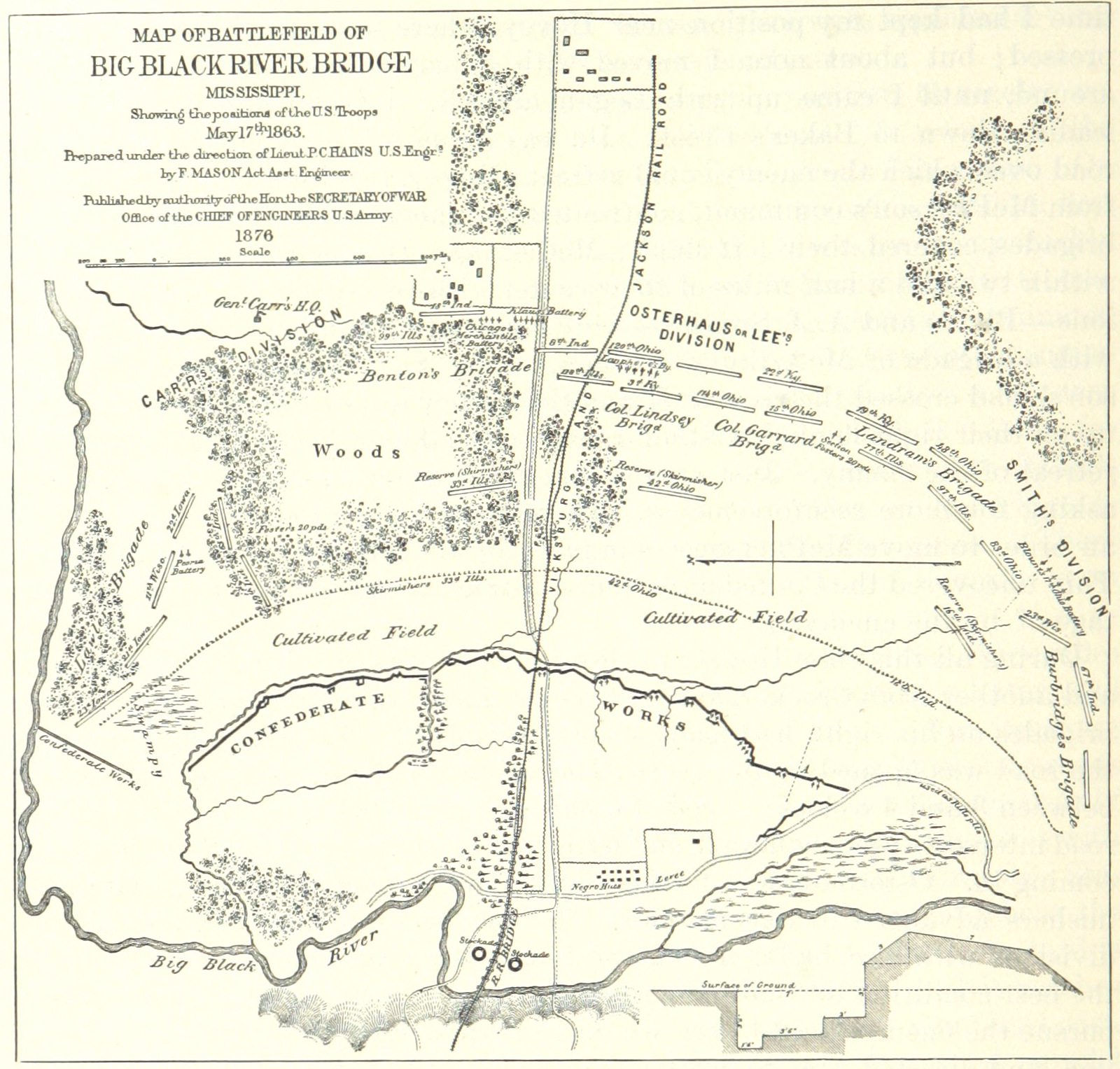
Battle of Big Black River Bridge. 33rd Illinois is to the right of "Woods"

The 33rd Illinois transferred to the 1st Brigade, 14th Division, XIII Corps, Department of the Tennessee during the period March–July 1863. The regiment was ordered to Ste. Genevieve, Missouri, on 5 March, and was then shipped to Milliken's Bend near Vicksburg, Mississippi, where it remained until 25 April. The unit began its participation in the Vicksburg campaign when it moved to Bruinsburg, Mississippi, on 25–30 April. During the campaign, the 33rd Illinois was in Benton's brigade together with the 99th Illinois, 8th Indiana, and 18th Indiana Infantry Regiments. Benton's brigade was part of Brigadier General Eugene Asa Carr's division, Major General John Alexander McClernand's corps, and Major General Ulysses S. Grant's army. The 33rd Illinois fought at the Battle of Port Gibson on 1 May, Battle of Champion Hill on 16 May, Battle of Big Black River Bridge on 17 May, and Siege of Vicksburg on 18 May–4 July.

The regiment sustained losses of 13 wounded at Port Gibson, 1 killed and 2 wounded at Champion Hill, and 13 wounded at Big Black River Bridge. The highest casualties were suffered during the 22 May assault: 15 killed and 87 wounded. (Note: Casualties are listed on the memorial shown in the infobox photo.) Captain Henry M. Kellogg was killed in action on 20 May. At Port Gibson, Benton's brigade fought on the far right flank. At Champion Hill, Carr's division marched on the center road behind Brigadier General Peter J. Osterhaus' division and was only lightly engaged. At Big Black River Bridge, Benton's brigade attacked north of the railroad. Carr's other brigade under Brigadier General Michael Kelly Lawler make the decisive breakthrough. The 33rd Illinois captured 14 pieces of artillery. During the 22 May assault, Benton's brigade unsuccessfully attacked the 2nd Texas Lunette. Attacking at 10:00 am, the 33rd Illinois reached the ditch in front of the Confederate defenses but could go no farther. The soldiers took cover in the ditch while the Confederates tossed lighted shells down the slope. It was not until 7:00 pm that they were able to withdraw. During the siege, the soldiers of the 33rd Illinois found that eating blackberries alleviated a case of dysentery. Through 1 June, losses totaled 19 killed and 102 wounded, but 10 of the wounded men died. Vicksburg surrendered to Grant on 4 July 1863.

=== Department of the Gulf ===
The 33rd Illinois took part in the Jackson Expedition, which involved continuous fighting during 9–16 July 1863. While skirmishing on 13 July, Private Joseph W. Fifer from the regiment was wounded. Fifer would later become governor of Illinois. The Confederate defenders evacuated Jackson, Mississippi, a few days later. The 33rd Illinois was part of 1st Brigade, 1st Division, XIII Corps in July–August 1863. The unit had garrison duty at Vicksburg until August 20 when it was transferred to the Department of the Gulf, where it served until June 1864. The regiment garrisoned New Orleans, Brashear City, and Berwick, Louisiana, until October 1863. The unit participated in the Western Louisiana Campaign on 3 October–10 November. For the 33rd Illinois, this operation up the Bayou Teche was a lark in which the soldiers stole "wagonloads" of chickens from the inhabitants. While marching through New Iberia the men of the regiment began howling. The men claimed that this scared the townspeople so badly that they began to fly French flags from their homes. The regiment served with Union troops from eastern states. According to one 33rd Illinois soldier, the easterners, "wore more feathers and less dust than those from the West." When soldiers of the 33rd Illinois and the 3rd Rhode Island Cavalry Regiment got into a drunken fistfight, the Illinoisans ended with fewer injuries.

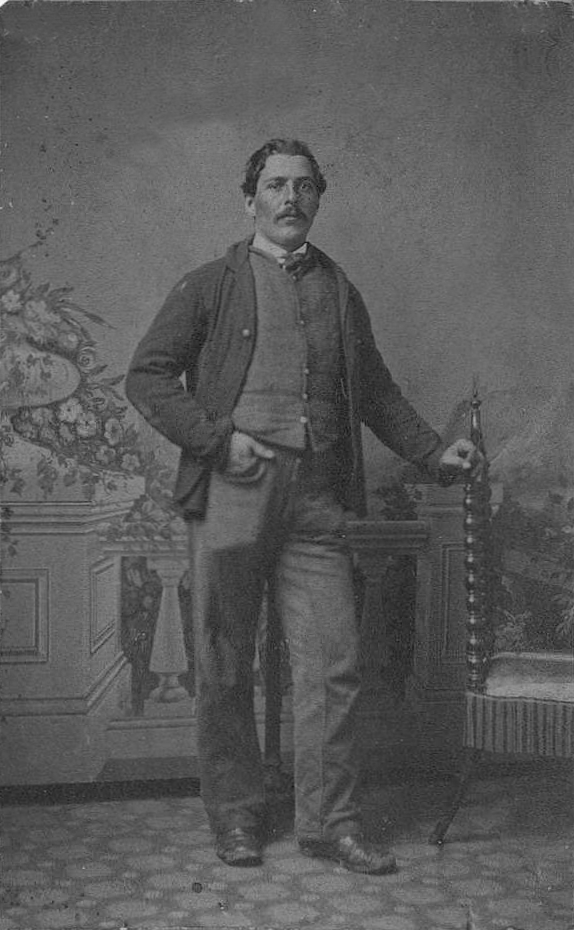
John C. McNeel, from White Oak, McLean County, Illinois, served in the 33rd Illinois

On 10 November 1863, the 33rd Illinois was ordered to New Orleans where it embarked for the Texas coast two days later. The expedition's goals were to raise the national flag in Texas, to cut off the cotton trade with Mexico, to damage the Texas economy, and to serve warning to the French occupation force in Mexico. On 22 November, the regiment landed on St. Joseph's Island with every soldier carrying three days of rations and 80 rounds of ammunition. The Union forces marched north on St. Joseph's Island and crossed to Matagorda Island. Fort Esperanza guarded the Pass Cavallo inlet. In the Battle of Fort Esperanza, the fort was abandoned by its Confederate garrison on 29–30 November. More than one soldier claimed that the flag of the 33rd Illinois was the first to fly over the abandoned fort. Frank Adams wrote in his diary on November 28th, "Went up to the top of the lighthouse and took observations all the morning and was thereby nearly frozen. Made a rope ladder and went up again just at evening with Capt. Illshy. Hoisted the stars & stripes." Its capture gave the Union control of Matagorda Bay. First Lieutenant George H. Fifer was mortally wounded in the fighting and died 26 December 1863 of Pneumo Thorax, according to Frank Adams' diary. The 33rd Illinois performed garrison duty at Indianola and Lavaca until March 1864. During this period, the regiment was part of Brigadier General Fitz Henry Warren's brigade.

On 8 January 1864, most of the soldiers of the 33rd Illinois reenlisted as veterans; a bounty of $402 was offered. The men who chose to reenlist left Texas on 28 January 1864 while those who chose not to reenlist were transferred to the 99th Illinois Infantry Regiment. The men who reenlisted reached Bloomington on 14 March and received their veterans' furlough. On 18 April, the regiment reorganized at Camp Butler and proceeded first to St. Louis and then to New Orleans, arriving on 29 April. The unit moved to Brashear City on 17 May where it was parceled out to defend the railroad. Companies A and D were ordered to Tigerville, Company B to Bayou Lafourche, Companies C, F, and K to Bayou Boeuf, Company E to Terre Bonne, Company G to Chacahoula, Company H to Boutte, and Company I to Bayou L'Ourse. The unit was assigned to the District of LaFourche in June 1864 – February 1865. The men temporarily assigned to the 99th Illinois rejoined the 33rd Illinois on 3 July 1864.

On 18 September 1864, the more than 100 soldiers of the 33rd Illinois who had not reenlisted embarked on the steamer Cassandra along with 300 Confederate prisoners that they were assigned to guard. After reaching New York City, the Illinoisans traveled by railroad to Camp Butler on 3 October and were mustered out on 11 October. On 5 March 1865, the regiment boarded a railroad train to join the XVI Corps. That day, the train derailed at Boutte and nine men from Companies A, D, and G were killed in the wreck. Another 72 men were injured of whom 2–3 men later died. The injured soldiers were mostly in Companies A and D, but all companies had injured men except C and F at the rear of the train. A number of injured men had to be discharged because they were disabled.

The 33rd Illinois participated in the Mobile campaign on 18 March–12 April 1865. The regiment was assigned to Colonel William L. McMillen's 1st Brigade, Brigadier General John McArthur's 1st Division, Major General Andrew Jackson Smith's XVI Corps, Major General Edward Canby's Army of West Mississippi. McArthur's Division engaged in the Battle of Spanish Fort starting on 27 March. On the night of 8 April, the Confederate defenders evacuated Spanish Fort. Smith planned to have McArthur's 1st and Carr's 3rd Division at Spanish Fort join Brigadier General Kenner Garrard's 2nd Division for the Battle of Fort Blakeley on 9 April, but the fort was quickly captured by assault and they were not needed.

Mobile, Alabama, was occupied by Canby's army on 12 April 1865. The 33rd Illinois marched to the Alabama state capital at Montgomery on 13–25 April. Entering the statehouse, the soldiers of the 33rd Illinois held a mock legislative session in which they voted for Jefferson Davis to be hanged for treason, army rations to be changed to roast beef and turkey with cranberries, and their army pay to be increased to $100 per month. The regiment marched to Selma on 10 May and rode the railroad to Meridian, Mississippi, on 17 May. While at Meridian in July, the unit was filled up with soldiers transferred from the 72nd Illinois, 117th Illinois, 122nd Illinois, and 124th Illinois. Later, the regiment moved to Vicksburg where the soldiers were mustered out of service on 24 November. They traveled to Camp Butler where the enlisted men were discharged on 6 December and the officers discharged on 7 December 1865. A total of 1,924 men were carried on the muster rolls during the war. The 33rd Illinois Infantry Regiment suffered the loss of 2 officers and 56 enlisted men who were killed in action or who died of their wounds; and 1 officer and 250 enlisted men who died of disease, giving a total of 309 war fatalities.

== Contemporary ==
The 33rd Regiment Band was organized in 1996. The band members perform songs with Civil War era musical instruments at re-enactments and other events.

== Flags ==
The regiment carried 2 flags during the war. They were given to the unit in October of 1861 and were presented by a group of teacher from Chicago. One was a National flag having golden stars, the other one was a regimental flag featuring dark blue field bearing a bald eagle in the center with the words "Presented by the Teachers of Chicago," above it. Below the bird was a scroll containing the name of the regiment. The colors costed $130 which would be around $4,948 in today's money.

== See also ==
- List of Illinois Civil War Units
- Illinois in the American Civil War

== Notes ==
Footnotes

Citations
