= 13th Maine Infantry Regiment =

American Civil War Union Army unit

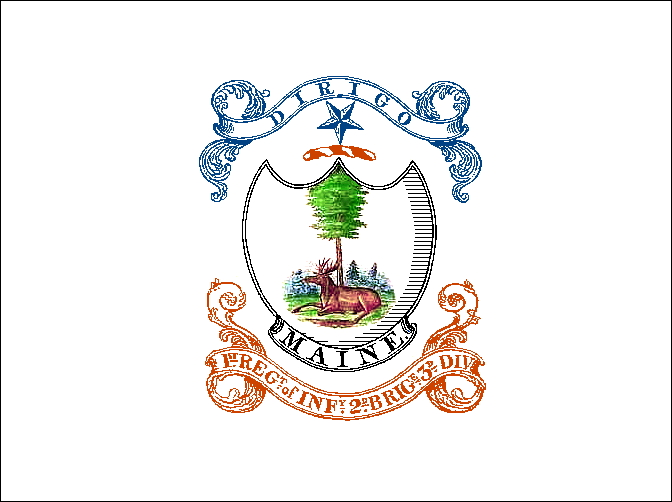
- Active: December 13, 1861, to January 5, 1865
- Country: United States
- Allegiance: Union
- Branch: Infantry
- Engagements: Battle of Brownsville; Battle of Mustang Island; Battle of Fort Esperanza; Red River Campaign; Battle of Pleasant Hill

The 13th Maine Infantry Regiment was an infantry regiment that served in the Union Army during the American Civil War. The regiment spent 1862–1864 in the Department of the Gulf and finished the war with the Army of the Shenandoah. During its service, it survived a hurricane off the Carolinas en route the Gulf of Mexico, manned the forts guarding the Mississippi Delta, invaded Texas at the Rio Grande and along the coast, fought in Banks' ill-fated Red River Campaign in Louisiana, manned Washington, D.C., defenses, and provided rear-area security for the Shenandoah Valley campaign in 1864 south of Harpers Ferry.

== Service ==
=== 1861 ===
The 13th was raised at large, and organized at Augusta, Maine, and mustered into Federal service for a three-year enlistment on December 13, 1861. Unlike earlier regiments clothed initially in militia gray, the 13th was issued regulation dark blue Federal regulation fatigue jackets, dark blue trousers, sky blue regulation caped overcoats, and prison-manufactured boots. The regiment appreciated the quality of the overcoats and footwear, but found the blouse and pants of poor quality. The 13th also was lucky to receive Enfield rifles instead of smoothbore 1842, rifled 1842, or German and Belgian smoothbores that were issued to other regiments training alongside them at the arsenal in Augusta.The regiment did, however, find the rushed manufacture of the Enfields leaving a rough finish which combined with its brass fittings made it difficult to keep clean.

=== 1862 ===
In January 1862, while in training in Augusta, the regiment, along with others there, suffered an outbreak of the measles, but lost no men to it. As training progressed, they heard rumors, which proved true, that the regiment was bound for duty with Major General (MGEN) Benjamin Butler in the Gulf of Mexico. On February 18, the regiment boarded the train in Augusta and traveled to Boston arriving on just before midnight on February 19. In Boston, Companies A, B, E, and I embarked on SS Mississippi for Ship Island, Mississippi, on February 20. Mississippi was scheduled for stops at Hampton Roads to pick up Butler, Hatteras Inlet to pick up Brigadier General (BGEN) Thomas Williams, and Key West for coal before arriving in Mississippi. At the stop at Norfolk, MGEN Benjamin Butler embarked. On February 26 off Hatteras, it ran into a winter storm (Butler referred to it as a hurricane) that lasted two days. After making it through the storm with the assistance of seamen in the 13th's ranks, Mississippi ran aground in clear weather and calm seas.

With the assistance of the blockade vessel USS Mount Vernon, she got away and limped to Port Royal where she was repaired. The four companies were transferred to SS Matanzas for the remainder of the voyage to Mississippi arriving March 20 at Ship Island and disembarking on March 22.

The day after the four companies sailed from Boston, the remainder (C, D, F, G, and K) entrained for New York embarking February 27 on SS Fulton. Due to missing the bad weather and grounding, these companies arrived almost two weeks before the others. On March 31, the 13th was brigaded with the 30th Massachusetts, the 1st Battery Maine Volunteer Light Artillery, the 12th, 14th, and 15th Maine as the 3rd Brigade of the Department of the Gulf under the command of Colonel George Shepley, the commander of the 12th Maine. As such, it was kept in reserve on Ship Island while New Orleans was taken.

The regiment continued training and drilling on Ship Island beset by disease spread by fleas and mosquitoes native to the island. Detachments of the regiment were sent into the defenses of New Orleans, July 5, 1862, and the entire regiment was ordered there September 1. By this time, the dark blue jacket and trousers had been replaced by the standard federal uniform of dark blue sack coat and sky blue trousers.

Through the remainder of 1862, the regiment was dispersed by companies through various strong points in New Orleans' defenses. Companies C and K were at Fort Pike and Fort Macomb guarding the entrance to Lake Pontchartrain. The remainder of the regiment garrisoned a pair of forts 70 miles (110 km) downriver from New Orleans on either side of Plaquemines bend, Fort Jackson and Fort St. Philip. On the south side, Fort Jackson was held by Companies A, D, G, and I manned the walls. On the north side, Fort St Philip held companies B, E, and H.

Although Butler's governance of New Orleans was popular in the North, Butler was replaced by Nathaniel P. Banks in December 1862. Banks soon began planning more military operations throughout the Department.

=== 1863 ===
When Banks reorganized his command in the Department, the 13th became an independent command within XIX Corps. As such, through the first three-quarters of 1863, the regiment remained in garrison at the forts inspecting the shipping and fishing traffic passing from Lake Pontchartrain into the Gulf of Mexico and down the Mississippi Delta to the gulf. The commanders of the stations took great pains to keep the regiment well-drilled and proficient in their arms throughout this period.

During the first half of the war, the Union Navy had successfully blockaded many Southern ports along the Gulf Coast. Cotton trade was a major economic asset for Texas and the whole Confederacy. Initially cotton was transported to Brazos Santiago Pass at the delta of the Rio Grande and exported from Port Isabel. Union forces captured this port and trade was moved inland to Brownsville, Texas. From Brownsville goods were transported across the border to Matamoros and from there to neutral ports along the Mexican coast.

==== South Texas Expedition ====
In the fall of 1863, the Union wanted to shut down the last holdout was in the Corpus Christi/Brownsville area at the mouth of the Rio Grande. Banks launched his Texas Coast operations in October to close the gap once and for all. Another issue for seizing Brownsville was the U.S. government was also anxious to show Union presence along the Mexican border since the French Army had just invaded Mexico and installed Maximillian, and there was an increasing tension and hostility with the French and Imperial Mexican forces. The Union planned to shut down the port and at the same time give a boost to Juárez.

The Confederate forces in the area were commanded by General Hamilton P. Bee. Bee's forces consisted of a mere four companies from the 33rd Texas Cavalry under Colonel James Duff and another two companies of three-month volunteers. All other Confederates along the coast had been called elsewhere in the wake of the Union attack at Sabine Pass. The total Confederate force amounted to roughly 150 men stationed at Fort Brown.

The 13th, with the 15th Maine, transferred from XIX Corps to XIII Corps for this operation as part of this expeditionary force. The 13th became part of the 2nd Brigade of the 2nd Division commanded by Colonel William M. Dye. The expeditionary force and its small fleet of steamer transports and towed sailing supply vessels arrived at the mouth of the Rio Grande shortly after noon, November 1, 1863. On November 2, the 13th landed on the east end of Brazos Island. On November 4 after unloading all necessary arms, supplies, and equipment, the XIII Corps moved west to Clarksville at the mouth of the Rio Grande. The 13th and the 20th Wisconsin stayed in Clarksville for a day while the rest of the brigade moved on to Brownsville with the rest of XII Corps.

On November 2, Bee had dispatched two companies of his cavalry to observe and report on the Union landing. Company A under Captain Richard Taylor arrived at the mouth of the Rio Grande while company F under Captain Henry Davis arrived at Point Isabel further north. On November 2 Captain Taylor informed General Bee the Union forces had landed cavalry while Bee made preparatory orders for the evacuation of Brownsville.

===== Battle of Brownsville =====
The 2nd Brigade of the 2nd Division led the Union advance up the river on Brownsville. After chasing off Duff's cavalry, Dye's men entered the Brownsville around 10:00 on November 6, 1863. As the Union forces spread out through the city. General Bee quickly ordered the evacuation of the city and abandoned Fort Brown. He personally supervised the burning of what military supplies and cotton he could. Inside the fort was 8,000 pounds (3,600 kg) of condemned explosives which caused a great explosion much to the terror of the local citizens. The Confederates' destruction spread into the city while the soldiers resorted to looting prompting the local citizens into a degree of opposition. A local resident by the name of General José Maria Cobos was a Mexican general and refugee living in exile due to the recent French invasion. General Cobos received permission from the civilian authorities in Brownsville to organize a force to resist the looters and subdue the fires started by the Confederate evacuation. Around noon General Banks personally arrived in the city and by 4:00 pm the remaining Union forces arrived. Colonel Dye was put in command of the post and the Union army encamped in the city, the army barracks at Fort Brown having been destroyed. The Union forces also captured a large supply of cotton left behind by the Confederates.

===== Chaos in Matamoros =====
Shortly after helping stop the looting and the fires in Brownsville, General Cobos led a force across the river and seized Matamoros. Banks was in communication with Secretary of State William Seward and keeping Washington informed of the political situation in Mexico. The French had sought and received Confederate support while aiding the Confederacy when and where they could. The Union consistent with its desire to preserve its republic supported the Republicans under Juarez. Cobos while no friend of the Hapsburgs nor French was also a conservative reactionary who denounced Juarez as a demagogue. Cobos had received the support of the local bandit chieftain, Cortina to take power, but they fell out the next day and Cortina executed Cobos.

The 13th and other men of XIII Corps were witness to this chaos across the river and were kept on alert during the remainder of their stay in Brownsville. The instability in Mexico would serve as a distraction to the Union for the remainder of the war in South Texas.

===== Battle of Mustang Island =====
Following the Battle of Brownsville, the 13th Maine and the rest of XIII Corps consolidated a garrison there under Major General Napoleon J. T. Dana. General Banks planned to move against Corpus Christi. Banks sent BGEN Thomas E. G. Ransom on an expedition against a Confederate earthen fortification on Mustang Island known as Fort Semmes. The Confederate garrison, of less than 100 men, was composed of detachments from the 3rd Texas State Militia under Major George O. Dunaway and the 8th Texas Infantry under Captain William N. Maltby. Ransom's force consisted of the 13th and 15th Maine, 34th and 26th Iowa, 8th Indiana, and one battery of artillery numbering around 1,500 men.

Ransom's men marched to Point Isabel where on November 15, the force embarked on SS Matamoros and SS Planter. Once across the bar at the estuary, the force steamed north along South Padre and Padre Islands to Mustang Island, a barrier island at the mouth of Corpus Christi Bay. Arriving at Corpus Christi Pass in the late morning of November 16, Ransom found the water too shallow in the pass to allow the force to land the troops on the inside shore of Mustang Island. They opted to make the riskier landing through the surf on the outer shore. Lieutenant Colonel (LTCOL) Hesseltine of the 13th was the first ashore followed by the rest of the regiment. The landing was not finished until after sunset, but looking to steal an opportunity on rebels, Ransom had his force march 22 miles (35 km) through the night to within three miles (4.8 km) of the fort by 0400. As dawn broke, the march to the fort continued. Upon reports from scouts of rebel pickets, Ransom deployed the 13th Maine ahead of the column in skirmish order.

Fort Semmes, occupied by men from the 8th Texas Infantry and 3rd Texas State Militia, was an earthen battery of three cannon designed to control traffic through Aransas Pass and, therefore, not designed to resist a land attack from the south. The skirmishers of the 13th were soon in contact with the small force of pickets inland from the pass. After the 13th fired a volley that sent the rebels back to the fort, Ransom deployed the 20th Iowa, 13th Maine and 15th Maine Infantry Regiments in line of battle while USS Monongahela fired into the fort from offshore. The regiments advanced stopping to fire volleys as they got closer to the earthworks. The small garrison of Fort Semmes was not prepared for open battle and the fighting was over shortly after the attack commenced. Major Dunaway decided upon an unconditional surrender of the entire garrison rather than making an attempt to fight their way back to the mainland.

Despite having been away from Maine for a little more than eighteen months, this was the 13th's (and the 15th's) first real combat, and BGEN Ransom commended both regiments for their conduct both on the march and in the combat. The attack captured 9 officers, 89 men, 100 small arms, 3 heavy cannon, 140 horses, 125 head of cattle, a "nearly new" schooner and a lot of wagons and small boats.

As Ransom's brigade consolidated Corpus Christi, MGEN Cadwallader C. Washburn arrived at Corpus with another brigade head of the Union expedition on the Texas Coast.

===== Battle of Fort Esperanza =====
The forces under MGEN Washburn remained at Aransas Pass for five days preparing their continued advance north along the Texas coast toward Matagorda Island. On the north end of Matagorda Island lay Fort Esperanza commanded by Colonel William R. Bradfute with a garrison of detachments from his own 8th Texas Infantry and the 5th Texas Militia regiment as well as a few local militiamen from the area.

The expeditionary force. led by the 13th's brigade under Ransom marched up the length of St. Joseph Island and began constructing a ferry to get across Cedar Bayou on November 23. Due to light skirmishing and bad weather, they took two days to cross. Once across they encamped to wait for the next Federal brigade under Colonel Henry D. Washburn to cross. On November 27 General Washburn arrived on the scene and ordered Ransom's brigade up the center of the island while Colonel Washburn's brigade moved on a parallel route along the coast. Washburn's brigade reached Fort Esperanza first. The Federals encountered pickets from the 8th Texas Infantry who retreated within the fortification after a brief reconnoitering skirmish. Bad weather limited activity on November 28 to minor skirmishing and occasional artillery fire which produced no results for either side. The weather turned bad again on November 27 and combined with a lack of requisite boats to thwart a planned leapfrog to McHenry Island behind the fort.

On November 29 with Ransom's brigade in place two Union batteries opened the fight with an artillery bombardment. Union infantry then drove in the Texas infantry from the exterior rifle pits while artillery continued with great accuracy against the Confederate defenses. Colonel Bradfute held a council of war that evening and decided to abandon the fort. Shortly after midnight November 30, Bradfute's men detonated the fort's magazines, spiked the cannon and withdrew. The explosion signaled the Confederates' evacuation and the Union force entered the fort only to realize the Confederate had already withdrawn. Two Indiana regiments were ordered to pursue the retreating garrison but managed only to capture an artillery piece used to guard the crossing point. Though much of the artillery and ammunition was destroyed General Washburn's expedition succeeded in capturing the fort and found much needed supplies left behind. The Confederate suffered one killed and ten captured while the Union soldiers suffered one killed and ten wounded.

==== Medal of Honor action ====
After Esperanza's capture, the force set up camps on either side of the pass. The 13th began the camp routine of drilling and digging shelters into the dunes due to the lack of tents. MGEN Washburn began gaining intelligence that the rebel state commander in Texas, MGEN John Magruder had promised to drive south from his recaptured Galveston to drive the expeditionary force into the sea and reopen Texas. To preclude that, Washburn frequently sent small reconnaissance patrols in land and up the coast.

On December 28, 1863, one of these patrols was conducted by the 13th Maine led by LTCOL Hesseltine on the Matagorda Peninsula. The 100 picked men were from companies C, H, and K. The patrol embarked on USS Granite City and traveled north to a point seven miles (11 km) from the head of the peninsula with an eye to coming upon any rebel scouting force from the rear as they swept south on the island. Landing in heavy surf at daybreak on December 29, Hesseltine sent detachments out for signs of enemy activity. Soon, heavy seas and high winds cut off communications with Granite City. The small detachments returned with no reports of rebel activity.

Hesseltine spread his men in skirmish order across the width of the island and started sweeping south with Granite City offshore to provide any naval gunfire support (NGFS). His command found the movement difficult so that by 1400, they had only moved south seven to eight miles (11 to 13 km). To speed his movement, he decided to pull his skirmish order in tighter. Hearing a whistle from Granite City and then the firing of its 30-pounder (14 kg) gun, he looked at the ship's target with his telescope and saw a large body of Confederate cavalry coming down from the north in his rear. He continued his movement south but maintained a watch on the cavalry. The NGFS was not having great effect on the cavalry only killing a few so that by 1430, the cavalry was close enough to start firing on his skirmish line. At this time Hesseltine had half his line turn about and fire a volley at their pursuers which scattered the horsemen.

Eventually, the patrol reached a point of the island where its width narrowed to 200 yards (180 m). Hesseltine put the patrol in line of battle across the neck, but the cavalry started fording the bayou inside the island to get to the patrol's rear. Having his patrol quick-time its way further south as he looked for a spot to stand.

He found a depression in the dunes surrounded by driftwood and brambles that formed a natural redan with its opening to the beach under the cover of Granite City. The cavalry force made several attempts to approach and recon the position, but the 13th sent them back with accurate gunfire each time. While the rebels tried to figure out their next course of action, darkness fell on November 29. The patrol lit fires to let Granite City's relief, USS Sciota know where they were. The patrol and its NGFS had inflicted many casualties on the rebels, but had yet to suffer a loss themselves.

For many of the men in the patrol, this was still only their third or fourth time in combat. The drilling that the regiment constantly conducted while in garrison was paying off in fire discipline and steadiness. Hesseltine kept the men at the barricades all night.

Their scouts approached, to learn from our rifles that we were awake. Soon after midnight the picket fired, and ran in to report a strong body moving to the left on to the beach. This force came up, but a sharp fire sent them to the rear, as the gunboat Sciota, which had slipped her anchor, ran round, and · poured in a broadside. They retired for the night.

The morning of December 30 was heavy with fog that impeded both the Union and Confederate forces. When it lifted midday, the gunboat CSS John F. Carr steamed down the interior bay to shell the makeshift fort "with her 20-pounder Parrott, making some very good shots, but injuring no one." At 1500 Hesseltine's small command was without food and water, and he decided to slip his men out of the position and head south on the island. The rebels were unaware of the escape and continued shelling the position.

Driving a handful of rebel scouts before them, the patrol continued marching in the dark in the midst of a terrible storm until 0100 on December 30 (this storm also ran CSS John F. Carr aground to wreck on a sandbar leading the Confederates to scuttle her lest she be captured). At daybreak they resumed their trek and by 1400 had reconnected with Sciota and through heavy surf reembarked for Corpus Christi.

In his report Hesseltine sang the praises of all his subordinates the steadiness and tactical proficiency of the men in his patrol, and specifically lauded the two US Navy ships concluding his report with:

Captain [George H.] Perkins, of the Sciota, excited my admiration by the daring manner in which he exposed his ship through the night in the surf till it broke all about him, that he might, close to us, lend the moral force of his 11-inch guns and howitzers, and by his gallantry in bringing us off during the gale.

To Captain [Charles W.] Lamson, of the Granite City, great credit is due for his exertion to retard and drive back the enemy. By the loss he inflicted upon them, it is clear but for the heavy sea he would have freed us from any exertion. Information comes in that the attacking force was Green's cavalry, and from 1,200 to 1,500 strong. I have allowed myself to be too minute in this report that you may understand exactly how 100 of our Yankees baffled, beat back, and eluded so large a body of rebels and rebel gunboat without loss.

The conduct and the patrol led the Confederates to believe their forces had encountered to be about 300 and for propaganda purposes reported in the papers that their force was of equal size despite their own military records. Hesseltine was later awarded the Medal of Honor for this action.

=== 1864 ===
In January 1864, Hesseltine became the commander of the regiment when Rust was promoted to command the brigade. On February 25, the regiment departed Texas to return to Louisiana. The two regiments who had been in garrison before the expedition and seen little action were recognized by other commands in the department as solid units. After their return to Louisiana from Texas, the 13th along with the 15th was transferred from XIII Corps to XIX Corps. Their old brigade commander, BGEN Ransom was promoted to command of XII Corps. The two Maine regiments were brigaded with the 160th New York and the 47th Pennsylvania in the 2nd Brigade under BGEN James McMillen in the 1st Division under BGEN William Emory in MGEN William B. Franklin's XIX Corps. In that transfer, Rust resumed command of the regiment.

==== Red River Campaign ====
In that organization, they participated in the Red River Campaign designed to capture Shreveport, Louisiana, and sever Texas from the rest of the Confederacy. XIX Corps would join XIII Corps in Banks' column.

(Some historians have claimed that the campaign was also motivated by the continuing distraction down near the scene of 13th's exploits in the last quarter of 1863, the 25,000 French troops in Mexico sent by Napoleon III and under the command of Emperor Maximilian).

The plan was Banks would take 20,000 troops (XIII Corps in two divisions, XIX in two divisions, a cavalry division, and a brigade of US Colored Troops) on a route up the Bayou Teche, where they would be met by 10,000 men from XVI Corps and XVII Corps from the Army of the Tennessee under the command of Brigadier General A. J. Smith. Smith's forces were available to Banks only until the end of April, when they would be sent back east where they were needed for other Union military actions. Banks would command this combined force of 30,000, which would be supported in its march up the Red River towards Shreveport by Union Navy Rear Admiral David Dixon Porter's fleet of gunboats. At the same time, 7,000 Union troops from the Department of Arkansas under the command of MGEN Frederick Steele would be sent south from Arkansas to rendezvous with Banks in his attack on Shreveport, and to serve as the garrison for that city after its capture.

Heavy late winter and early spring rains delayed the movement up from New Orleans. Banks halted at Natchitoches to consolidate his forces and rendezvous with Porter's flotilla. Although there were signs of the enemy, regular contact and light skirmishing only became daily on March 21. The 13th as it moved with its brigade, had no contact with the rebels as it moved up the river. They noted the change from sugar plantations to cotton plantations as they moved further northwest and into the pines. They saw little of their corps commander, Franklin, but frequently saw the XIII's commander, Ransom, under whom they served in Texas and held in high regard.

At this time opposed by a numerically inferior force led by Major General Richard Taylor, Banks and his staff expected no real resistance. Even still, Banks inexplicably veered away from the river and Dixon's support to chase Taylor into dense pine forests. The roads were poor and the army was strung out for miles along the Mansfield Road in a dense pine forest. On April 8 he reached Sabine Crossroads.

===== Battle of Mansfield/Battle of Sabine Crossroads =====
The 13th Maine as part of Emory's Division was in the reserve taking turns with the other regiments in the division manning the rear guard when the expedition made contact with the rebels. The lead elements, XIII Corps, deployed in battle piecemeal, found themselves outnumbered locally, and were feeling increased pressure from their flanks. At 1600, Walker's Texas Division thrashed and shattered the left wing of XIII Corps. As the situation worsened, Banks called up XIX Corps.

As Emory's Division was committed to the battle, they had to quick-time their way past the traffic jam of XIII Corps' wagons and artillery stuck on the road. Eventually, they met elements of XIII Corps thoroughly routed streaming back down the road. Emory deployed his division atop a ridge that descended to Chatman's Bayou with every member knowing how dire their situation was. The 13th as part of 2nd Brigade was kept in reserve. The rebels attacked and were thrown back repeatedly with severe losses. The 15th Maine and 160th New York were soon committed. Eventually, the 13th and the 47th Pennsylvania were committed to shore up the right wing from an enveloping attack and repulsed the rebels. The battle ended with nightfall.

The Battle of Mansfield (or Battle of Sabine Crossroads) was a strategic and tactical disaster for the expedition, but Emory's Division held its field at the end of battle. Most of the Union losses were from units outside of Emory's Division. This was also the first time that the 13th had seen heavy combat. Of note, it was remarked in official reports and regimental histories in being a battle where artillery played almost no role. As in Texas, men of the 13th found that all their drilling had paid off:

The Thirteenth had at last faced the enemy upon a real battle-field [sic], and had done its part in his repulse. In helping foil the flank movement, it had performed a most essential service, and probably saved Emory's division from sharing the fate of Ransom's gallant detachment of the 13th Corps; for Ransom's men had bravely repulsed all attacks in their front, and had only been beaten because their flanks had been turned by the enemy's superior force. For hundreds of families in Louisiana and Texas, the anniversary of Sabine Cross-Roads, as the battle was called, has since been a day of mourning.

Further, in his post-action report, Banks wrote:

Their attack was made with great desperation, apparently with the idea that the dispersion of our forces at this point would end the campaign, and with the aid of the steadily falling river leave the fleet of transports and gun-boats in their hands or compel their destruction. Nothing could surpass in impetuosity the assault of the enemy but the inflexible steadiness and valor of our troops. The First Division of the Nineteenth Corps, by its great bravery in this action, saved the army and navy. But for this successful resistance to the attack of the enemy at Pleasant Grove, the renewed attack of the enemy with increased force could not have been successfully resisted at Pleasant Hill on the 9th of April.

As the expedition prepared to withdraw, the men of the 13th learned that their old commander, Ransom, had been seriously wounded in the day's action.

===== Battle of Pleasant Hill =====
Shortly after midnight, the 13th received orders to withdraw quietly from their positions. The force was to fall back seventeen miles (27 km) to unite with BGEN A. J. Smith at Pleasant Hill. As they slipped away, the 13th found they had lost two killed and eight wounded in the battle (a further five were separated from the regiment during the retreat and were taken prisoner by the rebels). Due to the darkness and the order to maintain silence, the 13th Maine did not reach Pleasant Hill until 0900 on 9 April. The 13th and McMillan's brigade were the rear guard during the march.

Back at Mansfield, Taylor did not learn of Banks' retreat until dawn. He then ordered an immediate pursuit with BGEN Thomas Green's cavalry. Upon arrival at Pleasant Hill, Banks had his force prepare for battle and deploy to face the enemy with the 13th in Emory's division in the center left of the line. When the Green and his men came upon Banks' line of battle near the town of Pleasant Hill, they retreated a mile to wait for the infantry to arrive. By 1000, the 13th and its brigade had been relieved at the frontline by Shaw's brigade of the 3rd Division of A. J. Smith's XVI Corps and sent into reserve in the rear.

At 1630, Confederate BGEN Thomas J. Churchill's arriving infantry started the attack on the Union forces striking Col Lewis Benedict's 3rd Brigade of Emory's Division. Taylor thought he was sending them into the Union flank, but it was actually the center. Confederate cavalry also miscalculated positions and suffered heavily from flank fire. Churchill's men did succeed in collapsing this Union center position, but this also brought his men into the middle of a U-shaped position, with A. J. Smith's unused divisions forming the base of the "U". The 13th was pulled out of reserve and sent to the advanced Union right which had also collapsed, but they were recalled to shore up the center to join a counterattack. As they were moving into position a fleeing artillery team drove through their formation completely disorganizing it and knocking it back to a ravine to regroup. From the ravine, the 13th advanced with its brigade joined by elements of Benedict's brigade who formed on McMillan's line of advance. The push drove Churchill's infantry back and members of, and, joined by neighboring regiments, they routed Taylor's men from the vicinity of Pleasant Hill. As they drove the Confederates from the field in disorder, some of the artillery that had been lost the day before in the train were recaptured.

Being in possession of the field and having inflicted slightly higher losses on his enemy, Banks took stock of his expedition's status. Unknown to him, the state of his opponent was such that as Kirby Smith wrote, "Our repulse at Pleasant Hill was so complete and our command was so disorganized that had Banks followed up his success vigorously, he would have met but feeble opposition to his advance on Shreveport." Short of water and feed for the horses, not knowing where his supply boats were, unaware of the depth of the wound he had dealt his opponent, and receiving divided opinions from his senior officers, Banks opted for a rapid retreat downriver to Natchitoches and Grand Ecore to rendezvous with the fleet. It was a tactical victory for the Federals, but a strategic Confederate one because the Union army retreated following the battle.

The 13th had again performed well, but suffered losses. It last three killed, twenty-one wounded (seven of whom later died), and twenty-one missing, many of whom never returned to Maine after the war and were never heard of again. The regiment found the retreat after what they perceived a solid victory was "most unwelcome." The 13th marched twenty miles (32 km) on April 10 and reached Grand Ecore by 1500, April 11. The regiment encamped an built fortifications along the river for nine days waiting for the fleet to get past the rapids that were a factor due to the unusually low level of the Red River that spring.

===== The Campaign Ends =====
At Grand Ecore near Natchitoches, Banks received confidential orders from Grant to move the army to New Orleans to avoid further jeopardizing the timetable for the attack on Mobile Bay. The river also continued to fall, and all the supply boats had to return downriver. Banks gave the order to return to Alexandria.

On April 21, the regiment received orders to prepare to retreat further and destroy all property which could not be carried. The fires were a signal to the rebels "as if a courier had been sent into their camp." By 0200, April 22, they were in line of march with their brigade. On the afternoon of April 23, the retreat was delayed as, Porter had run into a delaying ambush at the mouth of Cane River after he tarried to blow up the stuck USS Eastport. While occasionally under artillery fire, the 13th watched the other brigades in its division close with and drive off the rebels at Cane River Crossing allowing them to cross and Porter to move down river. The remainder of the march to Alexandria was uneventful for the 13th as they arrived there in the afternoon April 25.

Sensing that they were involved in a perceived defeat, Banks's relations deteriorated with the cantankerous A. J. Smith and the Navy and with most of the other generals as well. He was determined to seize as much contraband as he could before retreating to the Mississippi and put his regiments on relief from manning the defenses to work loading cotton and sugar on the flotillas transports. The 13th spent all of May 11 performing this duty.

As XIX Corps prepared to retreat along the river under the guns of the Navy, Porter could not get many of his ironclads over the falls at Alexandria. Colonel Joseph Bailey designed Bailey's Dam, to which Banks soon gave night-and-day attention. Several boats got through before a partial dam collapse. An extra upriver dam provided additional water depth, allowing the march to resume. By May 13, the last vessel made it over the dam and the expedition quit Alexandria. When the Federals left Alexandria, the town went up in flames, the origins of which are disputed. Because the Confederates had already burned most of the cotton that was not on the fleet's vessels, many speculators at Alexandria were disappointed.

Unknown to Banks, Kirby Smith had taken half of Taylor's force to repel Steele to the northwest. As a result, Taylor tried to make it seem many more men were present, but he did not try to stop the dam construction. He did manage to sink two gunboats – USS Covington and USS Signal – and three transports – Emma, City Belle, and John Warner – downriver at Snaggy Point. Yet though General Taylor had promised to prevent the escape of the Federals, he could not do so. He blamed Kirby Smith for lack of support.

The 13th marched southeast along the southern bank, occasionally seeing the flotilla shell rebel forces on the north bank. Midday May 15, the column stopped at Snaggy Point. John Warner had been carrying mail from the expedition south when it had been taken by the rebels. The 13th saw this mail torn open as the Confederates had been looked for money and found some of their own letters. En route to the Mississippi, a running twelve-mile (19 km) engagement of a series of successful Union flanking movements was fought on the road to Mansura on May 16. In this action, the 13th was under artillery fire several times but found the Confederates had already retreated out of rifle range as the regiment advanced. In the halt at Masura, the 13th and its brigade discovered a shed with a large supply of tobacco and twenty barrels of salt meat intended for the rebel forces. The 13th and its brigade mates soon replenished their tobacco supply and seized the meat.

The 13th and the rest of the Union force suffered no casualties. The 13th was kept ready but never played no part in the Yellow Bayou, the final conflict of the campaign which took place on May 18 with significant casualties in a burning forest. Transport ships were lashed together to allow Union forces to cross the wide Atchafalaya River. The force finally reached the Mississippi on May 21 and went into camp at Morganza.

In this failed campaign, since March 7, the 13th Maine had marched over 500 miles (800 km), had performed well at Mansfield and Pleasant Hill, and had been shelled at Cane River and Mansura.

==== Northern Virginia ====
The regiment remained at Morganza through the rest of May and into June. In late June, they started hearing rumors of movement. On July 1 they were told XIX Corps was going to Northern Virginia. On July 2, the 13th boarded a steamer and made for New Orleans. Despite other military departments were considered secondary to the Army of the Potomac; and that XIX Corps were under orders to proceed to Fortress Monroe as rapidly as possible, the 13th and its brethren waited for steamers to become available.

On July 5, the command and seven companies of the 13th and the entire 29th Maine embarked on SS Clinton and the other three companies on another vessel. Just after dark that evening, the steamers unmoored and proceeded down river. By daylight the next morning, the 13th was steaming swiftly in the direction of Key West. Unlike their trip south in 1862, their journey to Hampton Roads was uneventful, "even stormy Cape Hatteras suffered us to pass without a ripple upon the water." On the afternoon of July 12, the two ships anchored at Fortress Monroe, "in very nearly the same spot where the Mississippi had anchored on the 24th of February 1862." Remaining overnight, they received orders to proceed to Washington in the morning. Just before noon on July 13, they debarked Long Bridge in Washington, DC.

For the next week and a half, the 13th as part of XIX Corps chased Jubal Early's raiding force back and forth and up and down the Potomac in defense of the capital until July 24.

In the ten days since landing at Washington, the regiment bad marched over one hundred and fifty miles, had forded the Potomac once and the Shenandoah twice, and had twice crossed the Blue Ridge. The arching vas very hard owing to the heat and the dust, 'The northern Atlantic States were then suffering from a very severe drought, having hardly any rain worth mentioning for two months, and when marching in the road the dust would almost step one's breath.

The regiment camped at Chain Bridge, resting and refitting, until July 26, when they marched to Harpers Ferry arriving on July 29. When, news arrived of McCausland's raid into Pennsylvania and his revenge burning of Chambersburg, they marched back toward Washington reaching Frederick, Maryland, on the afternoon July 31.

The five companies that had taken the different steamer arrived in the afternoon of July 16 at Long Bridge They immediately joined other troops in pursuit of Early until July 17 when they boarded a steamer for Bermuda Hundreds, where they reported to General Butler. After spending a week on picket and on the skirmish line, they rejoined the regiment at Monocacy on July 31.

On August 3, while at Monocacy, Emory, commander of XIX Corps, informed the Department that the 13th and 15th Maine had yet to receive their veteran furlough earned several months earlier. On August 5, the non-reenlisted men of the 13th were temporarily attached to the 30th Maine; while the reenlisted men took the cars for Baltimore on their way to Maine. They arrived at Augusta on August 9 and were furloughed on August 13. The furlough, expected to be only thirty days, was extended two weeks by a special order from the War Department. On September 26, they reassembled at Augusta, and the next day left for the front. They reached Harper's Ferry on October 1 where the regiment was rejoined the next day by the non-reenlisted men who had been with the 30th Maine.

These men had had an eventful foray supporting MGEN Philip Sheridan and his army in the Shenandoah Valley. On August 14, the 3rd Brigade, 1st Division, XIX Corps, to which the men of the 13th were attached, was detailed to guard the trains of Sheridan's army. For the next week, the train moved back and forth following the movement of the army through Winchester, Middletown, Newtown, Kernstown, and Charlestown. On August 19, the train stayed for two days at Gum Spring foraged aggressively. On August 21, nearing rebel forces caused the train to move to the bank of the Shenandoah at its junction with the Winchester Railroad. On August 28, the train was ordered to Harpers Ferry where it remained until the regiment returned from their furlough.

On October 5, the 13th was ordered to garrison Martinsburg, Maryland to relieve the troops there who were ending their enlistment. The 13th happily set up residency in "Little Massachusetts" (called that by the rebels due to its strong pro-Union sentiment among its residents). The supply depot and the residents' political leanings made it a target for Confederate guerilla activity, but the 13th and the 15th Maine maintained a constant picket around the town and saw off all raiders without loss. The time off the picket line was spent loading and unloading supplies at the railroad. These two duties precluded the 13th from returning to its usual drilling while stationary.

Despite several brief forays including a week at New Creek, Maryland, the 13th remained in Martinsburg until December 27 when orders arrived for all original members of the regiment who had not reenlisted to depart for Augusta to muster out. The 252 veterans and 82 recruits of the 13th were consolidated to a single battalion and transferred to 30th Maine on December 27, 1864. Those soldiers who did not reenlist were entrained on cattle cars that day. Reaching Baltimore on December 28, they were loaded onto passenger cars and headed home. They arrived in Augusta before 1700, December 30, "so near three years from the original muster-in date to the service as a regiment: Dec 31st, 1861." After almost a week of processing paperwork, the men were discharged from service on January 6, 1865.

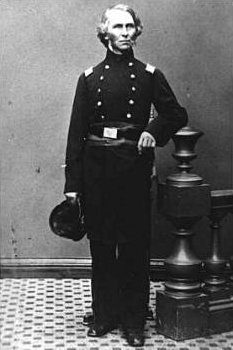
Neal Dow, former mayor of Portland, now commander of the 13th Maine.

== Total strength and casualties ==
The regiment lost 1 officer and 13 men. 3 officers and 178 died of disease for a total of 195 fatalities from all causes.

== Commanders ==
- Brigadier General Neal Dow
- Colonel Francis S. Hesseltine
- Colonel Henry Rust Jr.

== See also ==
- List of Maine Civil War units
- Maine in the American Civil War
