= 8th Texas Infantry Regiment =

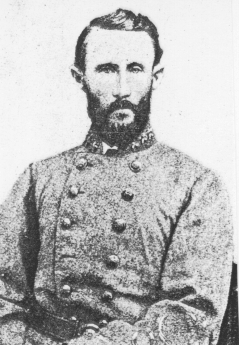
- Alfred M. Hobby was the regiment's colonel commanding.
- Active: 14 May 1862 – 22 May 1865
- Country: Confederate States of America
- Allegiance: Confederate States of America, Texas
- Branch: Confederate States Army
- Type: Infantry
- Size: Regiment (368 men, July 1864)
- Nickname: Hobby's 8th Texas
- Engagements: American Civil War; Battle of Corpus Christi (1862); Battle of Mustang Island (1863); Battle of Fort Esperanza (1863)

Commanders
- Notable commanders: Alfred M. Hobby

The 8th Texas Infantry Regiment was a unit of volunteers recruited in Texas that fought in the Confederate States Army during the American Civil War. In May 1862, the 8th Texas Infantry Battalion mustered into Confederate service in Refugio County, Texas, with three companies. A fourth company joined in June 1862, and a fifth company was added soon afterward. After training at Banquete, Texas, until July 1862, the battalion fought in the Battle of Corpus Christi where it defended that city. The full regiment was created when the 8th Infantry Battalion was joined by Shea's Artillery battalion, making 1 cavalry, 5 infantry, and 4 artillery companies. The regiment fought at Fort Esperanza in November 1863 and was transferred to east Texas soon afterward. At this time, many soldiers from the 8th Infantry transferred to Waul's Legion and fought in the Red River campaign. The regiment mustered out of service on 22 May 1865.

== See also ==
- List of Texas Civil War Confederate units
- Texas in the American Civil War
