= Thomas B. Needles =

American politician

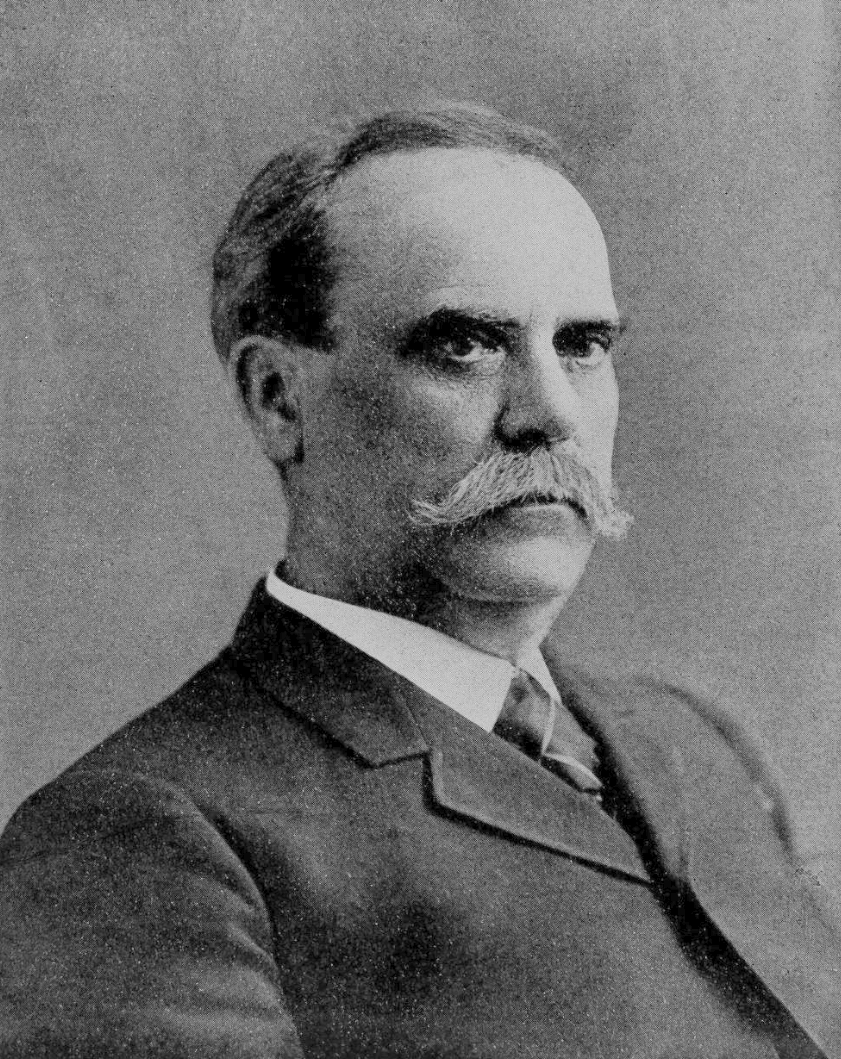

Member of the Illinois House of Representatives
- In office 1893–1897

Member of the Illinois State Senate
- In office 1881

Personal details
- Born: Thomas Berry Needles; April 26, 1835 Waterloo, Illinois
- Died: June 4, 1914 (aged 79) Saint Louis, Missouri
- Party: Republican
- Spouse: Sarah L. Bliss (m. 1860)
- Occupation: Businessman, politician
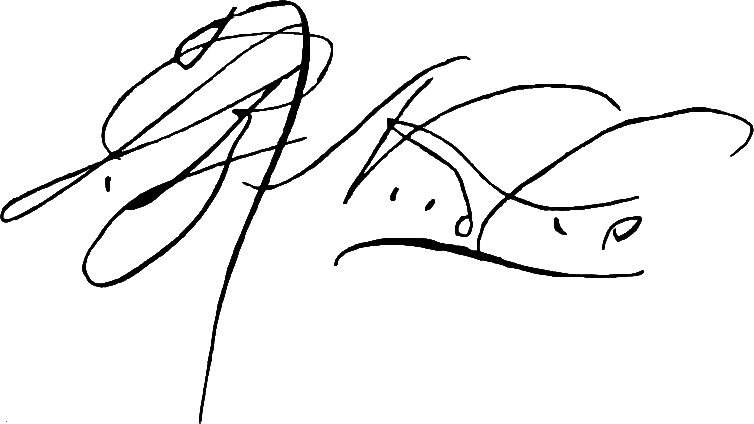
- Signature

Thomas Berry Needles (April 26, 1835 – June 4, 1914) was an American businessman and politician.

== Biography ==
Born in Waterloo, Monroe County, Illinois, Needles went to school in Mount Sterling, Illinois. He then worked with his father in the mercantile business. He then open a store in Nashville, Washington County, Illinois, and was involved with the banking business there. Needles served as county clerk for Washington County, Illinois.

He married Sarah L. Bliss on December 18, 1860.

Needles was involved with the Republican Party. From 1877 to 1881, Needles served as Auditor of Public Accounts, State of Illinois. In 1881, Needles served in the Illinois State Senate. In 1889, President Benjamin Harrison appointed Needles United States Marshal for the Indian Territory. From 1893 to 1897, Needles served in the Illinois House of Representatives. President William McKinley appointed Needles to the Dawes Commission.

Needles died in a hospital in Saint Louis, Missouri on June 4, 1914.

== Notes ==
Party political offices
Preceded by Charles E. Lippincott	Republican nominee for Illinois Auditor of Public Accounts; 1876	Succeeded by Charles P. Swigart
Political offices
Preceded by Charles E. Lippincott	Illinois Auditor of Public Accounts; 1877–1881	Succeeded by Charles P. Swigart
