= 18th Indiana Infantry Regiment =

18th Regiment Indiana Volunteer Infantry
- Flag of the United States, 1865-1867
- Active: August 16, 1861, to August 28, 1865
- Country: United States
- Allegiance: Union
- Branch: Infantry
- Engagements: Battle of Pea Ridge; Battle of Cotton Plant; Battle of Grand Gulf; Battle of Port Gibson; Battle of Champion Hill; Battle of Big Black River Bridge; Siege of Vicksburg - Assaults of May 19 & 22; Siege of Jackson; Battle of Brownsville; Battle of Fort Esperanza; Battle of Berryville; Third Battle of Winchester; Battle of Fisher's Hill; Battle of Cedar Creek

The 18th Indiana Volunteer Infantry Regiment was an infantry regiment that served in the Union Army during the American Civil War.

== Service ==
- The 18th Indiana Volunteer Infantry was organized at Indianapolis, Indiana, on August 16, 1861.
- Battle of Pea Ridge
- Battle of Port Gibson
- Battle of Champion Hill
- Battle of Big Black River
- Siege of Vicksburg
- Battle of Cedar Creek
- The regiment mustered out of service on August 28, 1865.

== Total strength and casualties ==
The regiment lost 5 officers and 68 enlisted men killed in action or died of wounds and 1 officers and 130 enlisted men who died of disease, for a total of 204 fatalities.

== Commanders ==
- Colonel Thomas Pattison
- Colonel Henry Dana Washburn

== See also ==
- List of Indiana Civil War regiments
- Indiana in the Civil War
