= 38th Iowa Infantry Regiment =

- Iowa state flag
- Active: November 4, 1862, to December 12, 1864
- Country: United States
- Allegiance: Union
- Branch: Infantry
- Engagements: Siege of Vicksburg; Battle of Brownsville; Siege of Fort Morgan

The 38th Iowa Infantry Regiment was an infantry regiment that served in the Union Army during the American Civil War.

== Service ==
Personnel for the 38th Iowa Infantry were enrolled chiefly in five counties in northeastern Iowa: Fayette, Winneshiek, Bremer, Chickasaw, and Howard. The regiment was organized and trained at Camp Franklin, Dubuque, Iowa, and on November 4, 1862, was mustered in for 3 years' service. The regiment re-occupied New Madrid, Missouri, on January 2, 1863, garrisoning Fort Thompson, and patrolling the woods and swamps of New Madrid and Pemiscot Counties, along the Mississippi River. On June 6, 1863, the regiment left for Vicksburg, Mississippi, a Confederate stronghold, as part of Major General Francis Herron's Division.

The 38th Iowa Infantry arrived on June 11, 1863, in the vicinity of Vicksburg, where the Union Army of the Tennessee under Major General Ulysses S. Grant was besieging the city. In response to rumors of Confederate cavalry moving from Yazoo City, Mississippi, Herron's Division was ordered to a position on the southernmost portion of Grant's line. On June 14, 1863, the 38th Iowa Infantry crossed the Mississippi River, and occupied the bluff above Warrenton, Mississippi. On June 15, the 38th Iowa Infantry took a position on the extreme left of the line, extending from the river to a short distance across the Warrenton Road. Vicksburg surrendered on July 4, 1863.

The 38th Iowa Infantry was ordered on December 12, 1864, to be consolidated with the 34th Regiment, Iowa Volunteer Infantry. More than 500 men of the 38th were transferred to the 34th. The consolidation was completed on January 1, 1865.

On April 9, 1865, the consolidated 34th Iowa Infantry participated in the last major battle of the Civil War at Fort Blakeley, Alabama. The regiment (including many soldiers from the old 38th Iowa Infantry) charged 500 yards against a redoubt; the regiment's casualties included one soldier killed and seven wounded from the old 38th. The 34th Iowa Infantry mustered out August 15, 1865, in Houston, Texas.

== Total strength and casualties ==
A total of 1037 men served in the 38th Iowa at one time or another during its existence. The Regiment suffered 1 enlisted man (Bendick Bendickson) killed in action at Vicksburg on July 16, 1863, when he was shot through the head, and one other (Evelyn Califf) who died of his wounds there on July 1 after being struck by pieces of an exploding shell. Four officers and 311 enlisted men died of disease, for a total of 317 and losses from all other causes had been 180. Most of these men died or were discharged due to disease from mid-July 1863 to mid-October 1863. The mortality loss alone amounted to over thirty percent of the total number enrolled, while the aggregate number of its casualties constituted nearly fifty per cent of its total enrollment. The regiment, without having had the opportunity to participate in any one of the great pitched battles of the war, passed through a frightful struggle with disease and death, only surpassed by other regiments whose conflicts with the enemy involved the loss of so many lives in addition to those claimed by disease. This period, when the Regiment lost more men to disease than any other Iowa regiment will come to symbolize the Regiment's place in Iowa's civil war history.

== Commanders ==
- Colonel William Brush - Commissioned as the regiment's commanding officer by Iowa Governor Samuel J. Kirkwood on September 12, 1862; commission revoked by governor for incompetence on October 26, 1862.
- Colonel David Henry Hughes - Promoted from Lieutenant Colonel on October 27, 1862, to replace Brush. Died of disease August 7, 1863, at Port Hudson, Louisiana.
- Major Charles Chadwick - Commanded regiment in place of Colonel Hughes from about August 1, 1863, until resigning on January 7, 1864.
- Lieutenant Colonel Joseph O. Hudnutt - Last commander of the 38th Iowa Infantry, from about January 7, 1864, until December 31, 1864, when mustered out upon consolidation of the regiment with the 34th Iowa Infantry.
- Colonel George W. Clark - Commander of the 34th Iowa Infantry; commander of the Consolidated 34th and 38th Regiment on January 1, 1864; brevet brigadier general, April 9, 1864; mustered out with regiment on August 15, 1865.

== See also ==
- List of Iowa Civil War Units
- Iowa in the American Civil War
