= Charles E. Lippincott =

American physician and politician

Charles Ellet Lippincot
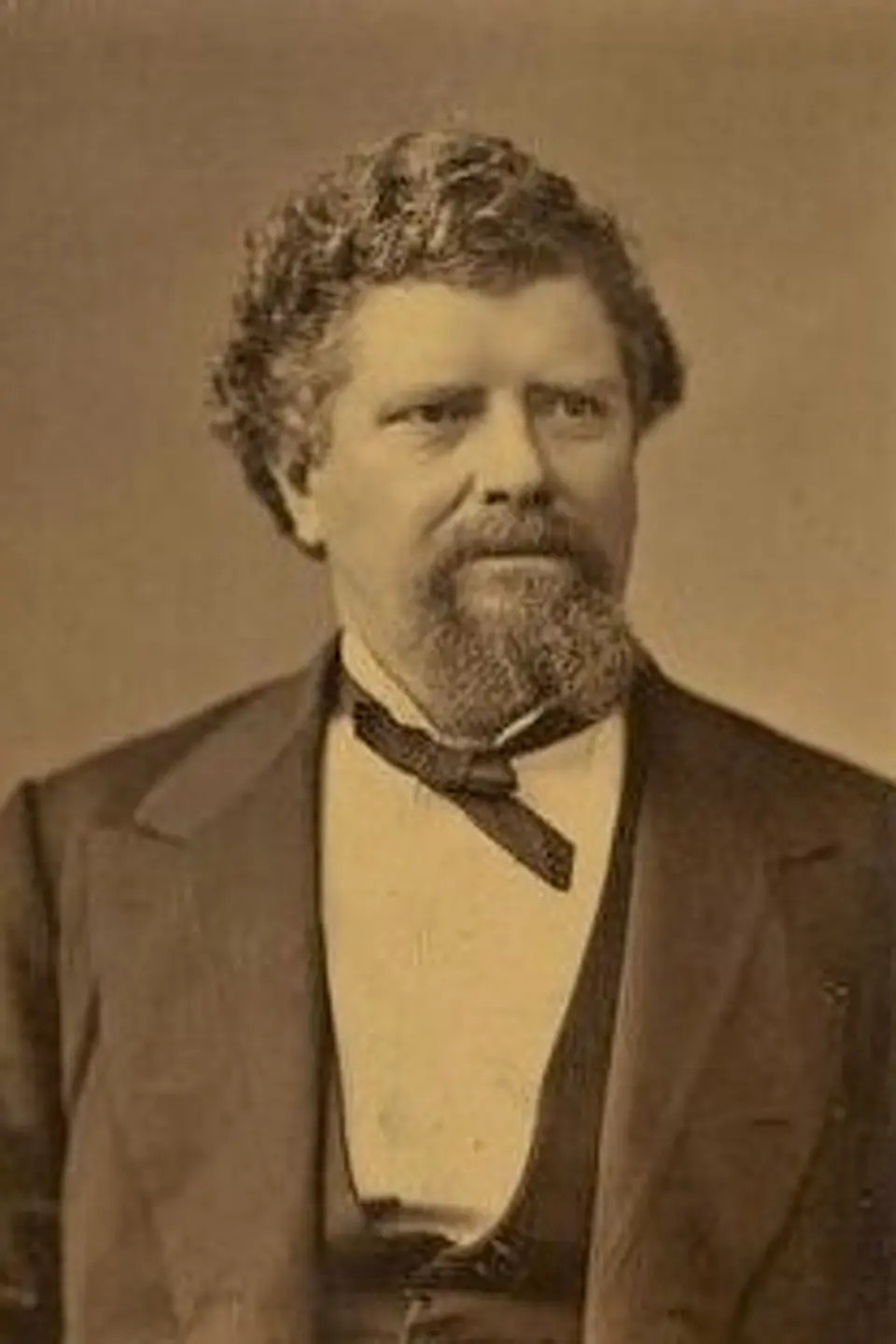

Doorkeeper of the United States House of Representatives
- In office 1867–1869
- President: Andrew Johnson
- Preceded by: Ira Goodnow
- Succeeded by: Otis S. Buxton

California State Senator
- In office 1853–1855

Auditor of Public Accounts, State of Illinois
- In office 1869–1877

Personal details
- Born: January 25, 1825
- Died: September 11, 1887 (aged 62)
- Resting place: Oak Ridge Cemetery

Military service
- Allegiance: United States
- Years of service: 1861-1865
- Rank: Captain (1861-1862); Lieutenant colonel (1862); Colonel (1862-1865)
- Commands: 33rd Illinois Infantry Regiment (1862-1865)
- Battles/wars: American Civil War

Charles Ellet Lippincott (January 25, 1825 – September 11, 1887) was an American medical doctor and politician. During the American Civil War, he served as colonel of the 33rd Illinois Volunteer Infantry Regiment and was brevetted brigadier general for his service.

== Biography ==
Born in Edwardsville, Illinois on January 25, 1825, Lippincott studied at Illinois College in Jacksonville, Illinois until 1848. He then received his medical degree from St. Louis Medical College, in Saint Louis, Missouri in 1849. Lippincott subsequently practiced medicine in Chandlerville, Illinois.

From 1852 to 1857, Lippincott lived in Yuba County, California. He was involved with the anti-slavery movement in California. Lippincott served in the California State Senate from 1853 to 1855 and was a Democrat. While living in California and serving in the California State Senate, he was involved in a duel with Robert Tevis who was killed as the result of the duel. In 1857, Lippincott returned to Chandlerville, Illinois and continued to practice medicine.

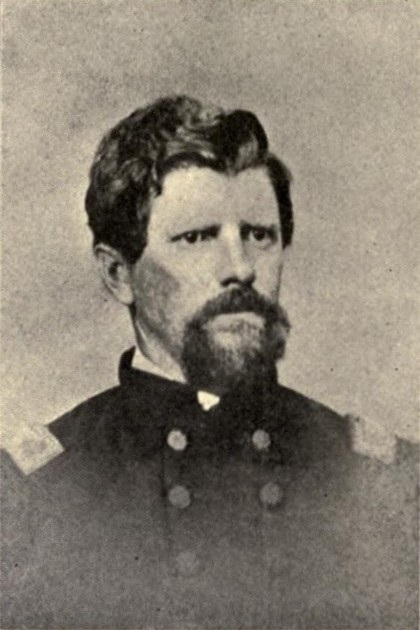
Col. Lippincott

During the American Civil War, Lippincott helped recruit the 33rd Illinois Volunteer Infantry Regiment and was commissioned as captain of Company K on September 2, 1861. He was promoted to lieutenant colonel on March 1, 1862, and colonel on September 17, 1862, succeeding Charles E. Hovey as regimental commander. On May 22, 1863, Lippincott was wounded in the foot during a frontal assault in the siege of Vicksburg. On February 17, 1865, he was brevetted brigadier general of volunteers. Lippincott was released from active duty on September 10, 1865, and succeeded by Isaac H. Elliott as regimental commander.

In 1867, Lippincott served as secretary of the Illinois State Senate; then, he was appointed Doorkeeper of the United States House of Representatives. From 1869 to 1877, Lippincott served as Auditor of Public Accounts, State of Illinois. Lippincott was involved in the Republican Party in Illinois. He served as the first superintendent of the Soldiers and Sailors House in Quincy, Illinois; he died there on September 11, 1887. Lippincott was interred at Oak Ridge Cemetery in Springfield, Illinois.

== Notes ==
Party political offices
Preceded by Orlin H. Miner	Republican nominee for Illinois Auditor of Public Accounts; 1868, 1872	Succeeded by Thomas B. Needles
Political offices
Preceded by Orlin H. Miner	Illinois Auditor of Public Accounts; 1869–1877	Succeeded by Thomas B. Needles
