= Thomas E. G. Ransom =

Union Army general (1834–1864)

Thomas Edwin Greenfield Ransom
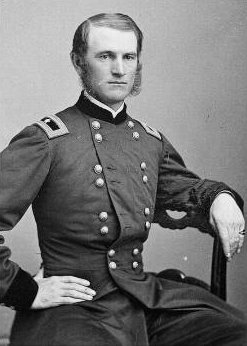
- Born: November 29, 1834; Norwich, Vermont, US
- Died: October 29, 1864 (aged 29); Rome, Georgia, US
- Burial place: Rosehill Cemetery, Chicago, Illinois, US
- Military career
- Allegiance: United States of America; Union
- Branch: United States Army; Union Army
- Service years: 1861–1864
- Rank: Brigadier General; Major General (Brevet)
- Commands: 11th Illinois Volunteer Infantry Regiment
- Conflicts: American Civil War: Battle of Fort Donelson; Battle of Shiloh; Siege of Vicksburg; Battle of Brownsville; Battle of Mustang Island; Battle of Fort Esperanza; Battle of Sabine Cross Roads; Battle of Jonesborough

Thomas Edwin Greenfield Ransom (November 29, 1834 – October 29, 1864) was a surveyor, civil engineer, real estate speculator, and a general in the Union Army during the American Civil War.

== Biography ==
Ransom was born in Norwich, Vermont, son of Colonel Truman B. Ransom, who was killed in action at the Battle of Chapultepec during the Mexican–American War, when the younger Ransom was only 14 years old. His father was remembered by a participant in that battle, Adjutant General Richard Coulter Drum of the Regular Army, as "by all odds the most brilliant man under fire I have ever seen." Thomas Ransom's siblings included Dunbar R. Ransom, who fought for the Union and attained the rank of brevet colonel. Thomas Ransom entered Norwich University in 1848, where he remained three years. After graduating in 1851 he went to Illinois, where he engaged in civil engineering and real estate speculation. He initially lived with his uncle, George Gilson, then mayor of Peru, an Illinois River town in LaSalle County. Ransom was known as the "boy surveyor" of LaSalle County. During that period, he was joined by his close friend and fellow Norwich University graduate, Grenville M. Dodge, who would later win fame as a Civil War general and the chief engineer of the Union Pacific Railroad.

As the Civil War began, Ransom was in the employ of the Illinois Central Railroad, living in Fayette County.

In response to President Abraham Lincoln's call for troops in 1861, Ransom raised a body of soldiers that became Company E of the 11th Illinois Infantry, and was elected its captain on April 6, 1861, then major on June 4. He was commissioned lieutenant colonel of the regiment July 30, and colonel on February 15, 1862. He was commissioned brigadier general on November 9, 1862, and in January 1863, took command of a brigade in Brigadier General John McArthur's Sixth Division of McPherson's XVII Corps.

Ransom was wounded four times: in a skirmish near Charleston, Missouri, on August 20, 1861; at the Fort Donelson in February 1862; severely (in the head) during the Battle of Shiloh on April 6, 1862; and at the Battle of Sabine Cross Roads, Louisiana, on April 8, 1864. His wounds at the latter engagement were so severe that he was evacuated to Chicago for treatment.

At various times, he commanded divisions of XIII, XVI and XVII Corps. He led XVII Corps in the pursuit of a Confederate force through North Georgia into Alabama. Returning to Georgia in October, he was taken severely ill with dysentery, but remained in command and on the field until too weak to go further. When told that he had but a few hours to live, he answered: "I am not afraid to die, I have met death too often to be afraid of it now." He was awarded a brevet promotion to major general on September 1, 1864 and died a few weeks later.

== Burial ==
General Ransom is buried in Rosehill Cemetery in Chicago.

Ransom's memory was cherished by many prominent Union Generals including Grant and Sherman. The historian Edward G. Longacre notes that the stoic Grant wept upon hearing of young Ransom's death. Ransom's close friend, Grenville Dodge, recalled how, even years later, President Grant would frequently talk about young Ransom with great affection and respect. Sherman kept a photograph of General Ransom on the wall of his office 20 years after the war.

After his death, the community of Ransom, Illinois, was named in his honor. Fort Ransom and Ransom County in North Dakota are named after him.

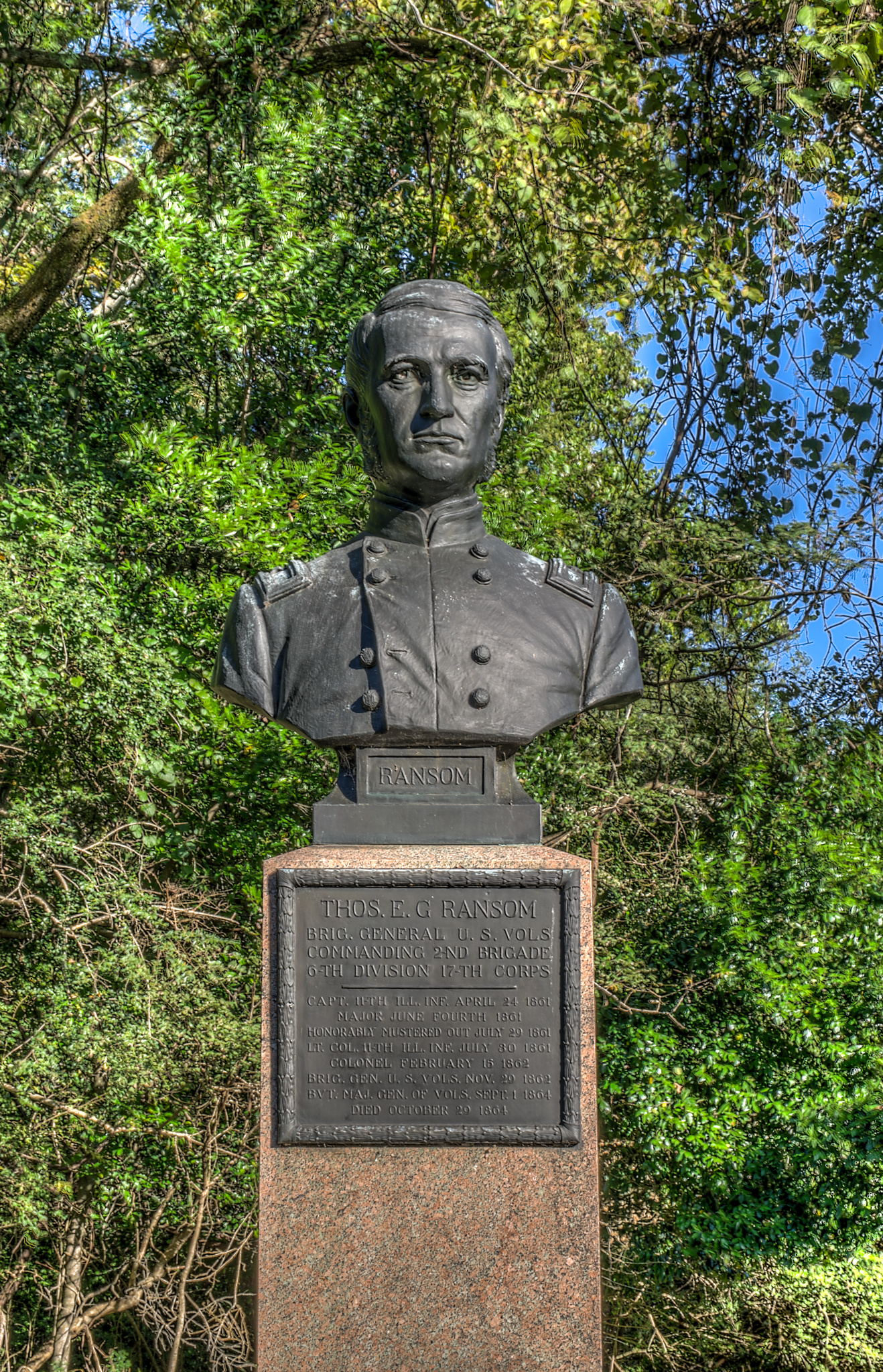
Bust of Ransom by George Brewster at Vicksburg National Military Park

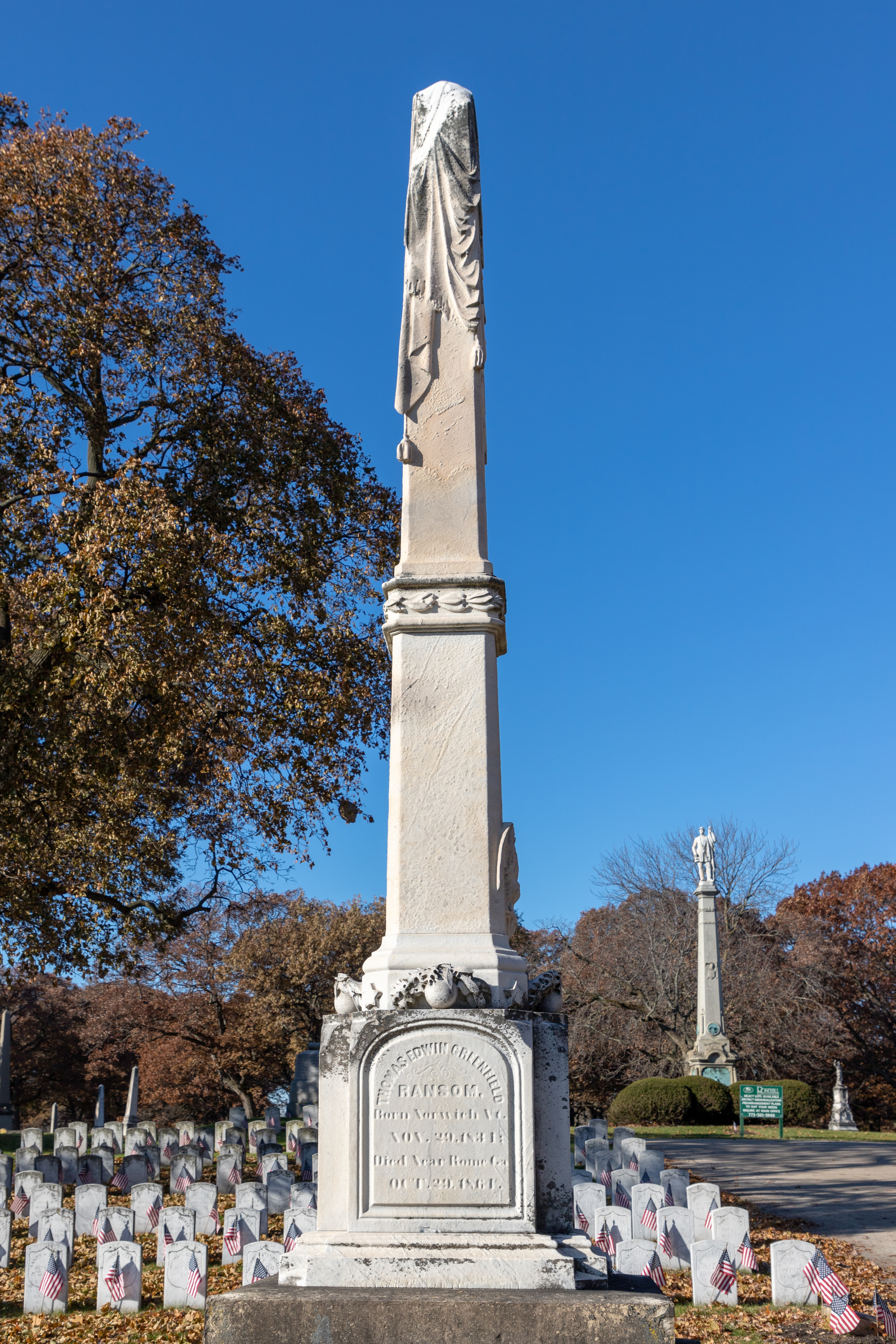
Grave monument of Thomas E. G. Ransom, Rosehill Cemetery, Chicago.

== See also ==
- List of American Civil War generals (Union)
