= 8th Indiana Infantry Regiment =

8th Regiment Indiana Volunteer Infantry
- Active: April 21, 1861, to August 6, 1861; August 20, 1861, to August 28, 1865
- Country: United States
- Allegiance: Union
- Branch: Infantry
- Engagements: Battle of Rich Mountain; Springfield Expedition; Battle of Milford; Battle of Pea Ridge; Battle of Cotton Plant; Battle of Grand Gulf; Battle of Port Gibson; Battle of Champion Hill; Battle of Big Black River Bridge; Siege of Vicksburg - Assaults of May 19 & 22; Siege of Jackson; Battle of Brownsville; Battle of Fort Esperanza; Battle of Berryville; Third Battle of Winchester; Battle of Fisher's Hill; Battle of Cedar Creek

The 8th Indiana Volunteer Infantry Regiment was an infantry regiment that served in the Union Army during the American Civil War.

== Service ==
The 8th Indiana Volunteer Infantry was organized at Indianapolis, Indiana, on April 21, 1861, for a three-month enlistment. On June 19, 1861, the regiment was moved to Clarksburg, West Virginia, and attached to William Rosecrans' Brigade, in George B. McClellan's Provisional Army of West Virginia. On June 29, it was marched to Buckhannon, West Virginia, and occupied Buckhannon on June 30. The regiment engaged in the Western Virginia Campaign, July 6–17, fighting in the Battle of Rich Mountain on July 11. The regiment was mustered out of service on August 6, 1861.

== Total strength and casualties ==
The regiment lost 5 enlisted men (Alfred Wilson, Richard Lamb, First sergeant Frank Mays, Private John Scotten, and Alfred Lowder) killed in action or died of wounds and 3 enlisted men who died of disease, for a total of 8 fatalities.

== Commanders ==
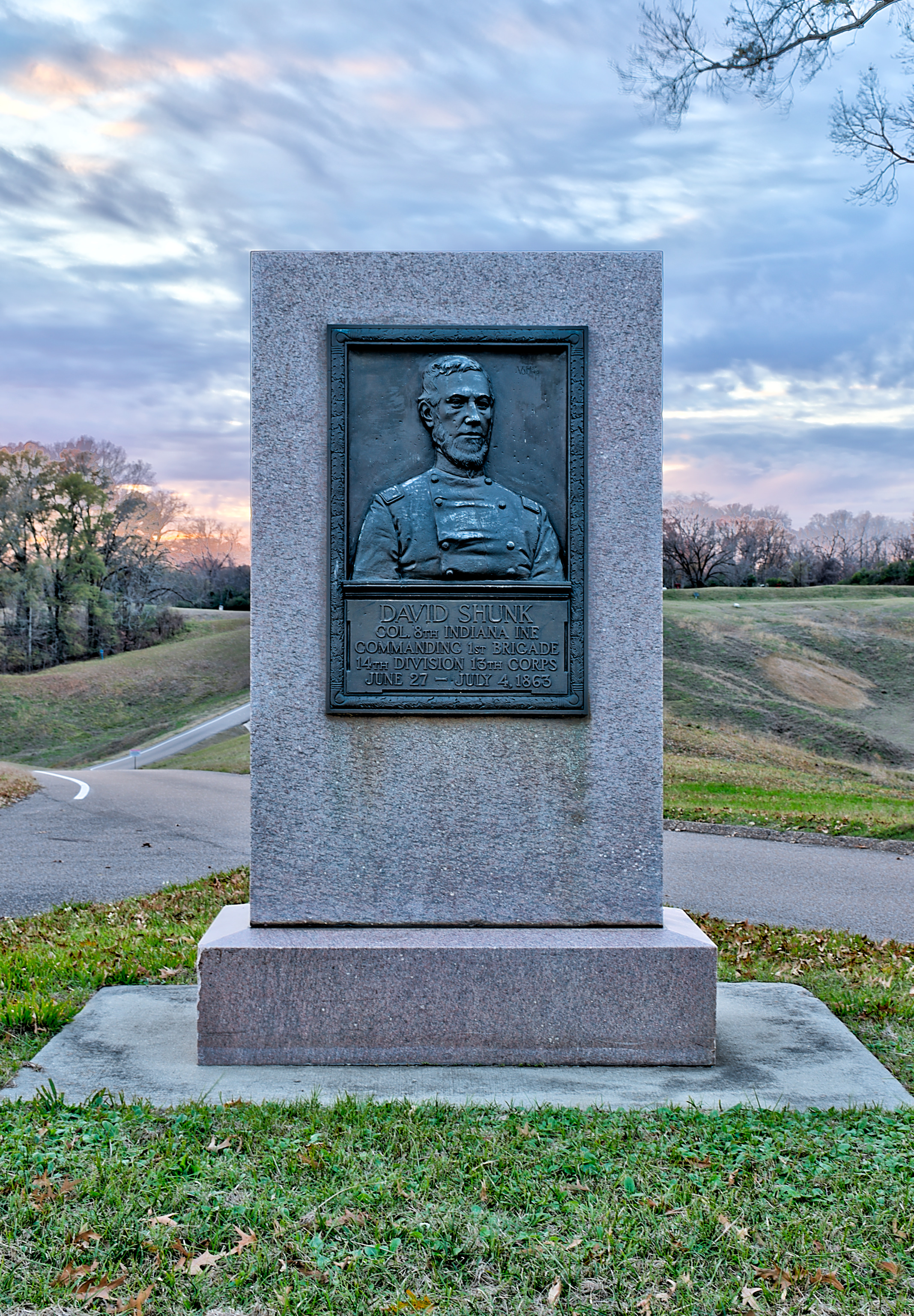
Relief portrait of Col. David Shunk at Vicksburg National Military Park

- Colonel David Shunk

== See also ==
- List of Indiana Civil War regiments
- Indiana in the Civil War
