= Battle of Mustang Island =

Battle of the American Civil War

- Part of the Trans-Mississippi Theater of the American Civil War
Date	November 17, 1863
Location	Mustang Island, Texas 27°44′22″N 97°07′54″W
Result	Union victory

Belligerents
United States (Union)	(Confederate States of America) CSA (Confederacy)

Commanders and leaders
Nathaniel P. Banks; Thomas E. G. Ransom	George O. Dunaway

Strength
13th Maine Volunteer Infantry Regiment; 15th Maine Volunteer Infantry Regiment; 20th Iowa Volunteer Infantry Regiment; USS Monongahela	Detachments from: Co. "I" 8th Texas Infantry Regiment; 3rd Texas Militia Regiment

Casualties and losses
Unknown	Unknown killed and wounded 98 surrendered
- Location within Texas Battle of Mustang Island (the United States)

The Battle of Mustang Island (November 17, 1863) was fought in Texas during the American Civil War. It was part of a campaign by Major General Nathaniel P. Banks to occupy positions along the Texas coast. One of Banks's forces attacked a Confederate fort, capturing its small garrison.

== Background ==
Following the Battle of Brownsville, the Union army consolidated a garrison there under Major General Napoleon J. T. Dana. General Banks planned to move against Corpus Christi. Banks directed Brigadier General Thomas E. G. Ransom on an expedition against a Confederate earthen fortification on Mustang Island known as Fort Semmes. The Confederate garrison, of less than 100 men, was composed of detachments from the 3rd Texas State Militia under Major George O. Dunaway and the 8th Texas Infantry under Captain William N. Maltby.

== Battle ==
Ransom's men made a forced march against Fort Semmes which was occupied by men from the 8th Texas Infantry and 3rd Texas State Militia. The Union advance encountered Confederate skirmishers on November 17. Ransom's men fired one volley causing the Texas skirmishers to retreat back into Fort Semmes. Ransom deployed the 20th Iowa, 13th Maine and 15th Maine Infantry Regiments in line of battle while the USS Monongahela fired into the fort from offshore. The small garrison of Fort Semmes was not prepared for open battle and the fighting was over shortly after the attack commenced. Major Dunaway decided upon an unconditional surrender of the entire garrison rather than making an attempt to fight their way back to the mainland.

Major General Cadwallader C. Washburn arrived at the head of the Union expedition on the Texas Coast. Washburn next led Union forces to capture Fort Esperanza on November 30, 1863.
