= 15th Maine Infantry Regiment =

- Active: December 6, 1861 - July 5, 1866
- Country: United States
- Allegiance: Union
- Branch: Infantry
- Engagements: Battle of Brownsville; Red River Campaign; Battle of Mansfield; Battle of Fort Stevens; Battle of Mustang Island

The 15th Maine Infantry Regiment was an infantry regiment that served in the Union Army during the American Civil War.

== Service ==
The 15th Maine Infantry was organized in Augusta, Maine December 6–31, 1861 and mustered in January 23, 1862, for a three-year enlistment.

The regiment was attached to Butler's New Orleans Expeditionary Corps January to March 1862. 3rd Brigade, Department of the Gulf, to September 1862, District of West Florida, Department of the Gulf, to June 1863. 2nd Brigade, 4th Division, XIX Corps, Department of the Gulf, to December 1863. 3rd Brigade, 2nd Division, XIII Corps, Department of the Gulf, to January 1864. 2nd Brigade, 4th Division, XIII Corps, Department of the Gulf, to February 1864. 2nd Brigade, 1st Division, XIX Corps, Department of the Gulf, to July 1864, and Army of the Shenandoah, Middle Military Division, to April 1865. 1st Brigade, 1st Division, Department of Washington, to June 1865. 2nd Separate Brigade, District of South Carolina, Department of the South, to July 1866.

The 15th Maine Infantry mustered out of service July 5, 1866.

== Detailed service ==
=== 1862 ===
- Moved to Portland. February 25
- Embarked for Ship Island, Miss., March 6.
- Duty at Ship Island, Miss., until May
- Camp Parapet and Carrollton May 19-September 8.
- Moved to Pensacola, Fla., September 8 - June 1863.

=== 1863 ===
- Action at Fifteen Mile House, Fla., February 25, 1863
- Arcadia, March 6
- Ordered to New Orleans, June 21
- La Fourche Landing
- Expedition to Thibodeaux, June 23–25
- At Camp Parapet until August
- Provost duty in New Orleans until October.
- Expedition to the Rio Grande, Texas, October 27-December 2.
  - Advance on Brownsville, November 3–6.
  - Occupation of Brownsville, November 6.
  - Expedition to Aransas, November 14–21.
  - Aransas Pass and capture of Mustang Island, November 17.
  - Fort Esperanza, November 25–27.
  - Cedar Bayou (detachment), November 23

=== 1864 ===
- Duty at Pass Cavallo Matagorda Island, until February 28, 1864
- Moved to Franklin, La., March 1–5
- Red River Campaign, March 10-May 22
- Advance from Franklin to Alexandria, March 14–26
- Natchitoches, March 26-April 2
- Battle of Sabine Cross Roads, April 8
- Pleasant Hill, April 9
- Cane River Crossing, April 23
- At Alexandria, April 26-May 13
- Retreat to Morganza, May 13–22
- Mansura, May 16
  - Duty at Morganza until July.
- Moved to Fort Monroe (6 companies)., then to Bermuda Hundred, Va., July 1–17
- Duty in trenches at Bermuda Hundred until July 28.
- Deep Bottom July 28–30.
- Moved to Washington, D.C., then to Monocacy, Md., July 1 - Aug 4
  - 4 companies, under Murray and Drew, moved from Morganza to Washington, D.C., July 1–12.
  - Pursuit of Early July 14–24.
  - Rejoin regiment at Monocacy, Md., August 4.
- Veterans on furlough August 5-October l.
- Non-veterans temporarily attached to 13th Maine Infantry, and duty at Harpers Ferry until October 5.
- Regiment moved to Martinsburg October 5 - January 7, 1865.

=== 1865 ===
- Moved to Stevenson's Depot, and operations in the Shenandoah Valley until April.
- Moved to Washington, D.C., April 19–23, and duty there until May 31.
- On provost duty during the Grand Review of the Armies May 23–24.
- Moved to Savannah, Ga., May 31-June 4
- Georgetown, S.C., June 13–14.
- Duty at Georgetown, Darlington, Cheraw, Chesterfield C. H., Bennettsville, Columbia and in Districts of Chester, Lancaster, York, Spartanburg and Union until July 1866.

== Casualties ==
The regiment lost a total of 348 men during service; 5 enlisted men killed or mortally wounded, 3 officers and 340 enlisted men died of disease.

== Commanders ==
- Colonel Isaac Dyer

== See also ==
- List of Maine Civil War units
- Maine in the American Civil War
