= 34th Iowa Infantry Regiment =

- Iowa state flag
- Active: October 15, 1862, to August 15, 1865
- Country: United States
- Allegiance: Union
- Branch: Infantry
- Engagements: Battle of Brownsville; Red River Campaign

The 34th Iowa Infantry Regiment was an infantry regiment that served in the Union Army during the American Civil War.

== Service ==
The 34th Iowa Infantry was organized at Burlington, Iowa and mustered in for three years of Federal service on October 15, 1862.

The regiment was mustered out on August 15, 1865.

== Total strength and casualties ==
A total of 1081 men served in the 34th Iowa at one time or another during its existence. It suffered 1 officer and 11 enlisted men who were killed in action or who died of their wounds and 2 officers and 244 enlisted men who died of disease, for a total of 258 fatalities.

== Commanders ==
- Colonel George W. Clark - Appointed colonel September 1, 1862 and mustered October 15, 1862; transferred to command Consolidated 34th and 38th Regiment, January 1, 1864; brevet brigadier general, April 9, 1864; mustered out with regiment on August 15, 1865.

== See also ==
- List of Iowa Civil War Units
- Iowa in the American Civil War
