= Battle of Brownsville =

Battle of the American Civil War

Coordinates: 25.9022°N 97.4959°W

Battle of Brownsville, Texas
- Part of the Trans-Mississippi Theater of the American Civil War
Date	November 2–November 6, 1863
Location	Brownsville, Texas
Result	Union victory

Belligerents
United States (Union)	(Confederate States of America) Confederate States (Confederacy)	(Mexico) Mexican patriots

Commanders and leaders
Nathaniel P. Banks	Hamilton P. Bee	José Maria Cobos

Units involved
3 brigades from XIII Corps (6,000)	4 companies, 33rd Texas Cavalry (150); 2 companies of 3 month volunteers	local citizens

Casualties and losses
Unknown	1 killed 1 wounded 1 company deserted	Unknown

The Battle of Brownsville took place on November 2–6, 1863 during the American Civil War. It was a successful effort on behalf of the Union Army to disrupt Confederate blockade runners along the Gulf Coast in Texas. The Union assault precipitated the capture of Matamoros by a force of Mexican patriots, led by exiled officers living in Brownsville.

== Background ==
During the first half of the war, the Union Navy had successfully blockaded many Southern ports along the Gulf Coast. Cotton trade was a major economic asset for Texas and the whole Confederacy. Initially cotton was transported to Brazos Santiago Pass at the delta of the Rio Grande and exported from Port Isabel. Union forces captured this port and trade was moved inland to Brownsville, Texas. From Brownsville goods were transported across the border to Matamoros and from there to neutral ports along the Mexican coast.

The U.S. government was also anxious to show Union presence along the Mexican border since the French army had just invaded Mexico and installed Maximillian as emperor. Following the Union debacle at the second Battle of Sabine Pass, the U.S. government demanded General Nathaniel P. Banks, commanding the Department of the Gulf, to make another attempt at invading Texas.

== Battle ==
Nathaniel Banks assembled 6,000 soldiers from three brigades in Napoleon J. T. Dana's XIII Corps. The Confederate forces in the area were commanded by General Hamilton P. Bee. Bee's forces consisted of a mere 4 companies from the 33rd Texas Cavalry under Colonel James Duff and another 2 companies of 3 month volunteers. All other Confederates along the coast had been called elsewhere in the wake of the Union attack at Sabine Pass. The total Confederate force amounted to roughly 150 men stationed at Fort Brown. One company of volunteers under Captain Adrian J. Vidal defected, killing a private and wounding another from the 33rd Texas.

Banks landed the expedition at the mouth of the Rio Grande on November 2, 1863. Bee dispatched two companies of his cavalry to observe and report on the Union landing. Company A under Captain Richard Taylor arrived at the mouth of the Rio Grande while company under Captain Henry Davis arrived at Point Isabel further north. On November 2 Captain Taylor informed General Bee the Union forces had landed cavalry while Bee made preparatory orders for the evacuation of Brownsville. Colonel William M. Dye's brigade led the Union advance. After chasing off Taylor's Confederate cavalry, Dye's men entered the Brownsville around 10:00am on November 6, 1863. General Bee quickly ordered the evacuation of the city and abandoned Fort Brown. He personally supervised the burning of what military supplies and cotton he could. Inside the fort was 8,000 pounds of condemned explosives which caused a great explosion much to the terror of the local citizens.

The Confederates' destruction spread into the city while the soldiers resorted to looting prompting the local citizens into a degree of opposition. A local resident by the name of General José Maria Cobos was a Mexican general and refugee living in exile due to the recent French invasion. General Cobos received permission from the civilian authorities in Brownsville to organize a force to resist the looters and subdue the fires started by the Confederate evacuation.

Around noon General Banks personally arrived in the city and by 4:00pm the remaining Union forces arrived. Colonel Dye was put in command of the post and the Union army encamped in the city, the army barracks at Fort Brown having been destroyed. The Union forces also captured a large supply of cotton left behind by the Confederates.

== Aftermath ==
The loss of Brownsville significantly disrupted Confederate cotton trade. The new trade route into Mexico lay roughly 300 miles northwest. Brownsville provided a base for further Union operations against Mustang Island and Fort Esperanza up the Texas coast. General Cobos took his vigilante force across the border and seized control of Matamoros. There he continued to be of concern to General Banks.

Confederate forces made an attempt to recapture Brownsville in 1864. Colonel John S. "Rip" Ford assembled a large force of cavalry, but on July 30, 1864 Ford found the new Union commander, Francis J. Herron, had already abandoned Brownsville. The Confederates were able to reoccupy the city without a fight.

== Forces ==
=== Union Department of the Gulf ===
Maj Gen Nathaniel P. Banks

XIII Corps
Maj Gen Napoleon J. T. Dana

Division	Brigade	Regiments and Others
First Division; BG Cadwallader C. Washburn	1st Brigade Col Henry D. Washburn	8th Indiana Infantry – Maj Kennedy; 18th Indiana Infantry – Ltc Charles; 33rd Illinois Infantry – Col Lippencott; 99th Illinois Infantry – Col Bailey; 7th Battery, Michigan Light Artillery – Lt Stillman
First Division; BG Cadwallader C. Washburn	2nd Brigade (attached to 1st Brigade)	23rd Iowa Infantry - Col Glasgow
Second Division; MG Napoleon J. T. Dana	1st Brigade BG William Vandever	37th Illinois Infantry – Col John Charles Black; 91st Illinois Infantry – Col Henry M. Day; 26th Indiana Infantry – Col John G. Clark; 34th Iowa Infantry – Col George W. Clark; 38th Iowa Infantry – Maj Charles Chadwick; Battery E, 1st Missouri Light Artillery – Cpt Joseph B. Atwater; Battery F, 1st Missouri Light Artillery – Cpt Joseph B. Atwater
Second Division; MG Napoleon J. T. Dana	2nd Brigade Col William M. Dye	13th Maine Infantry - Ltc Frank Hesseltine; 19th Iowa Infantry - Maj John Bruce; 20th Iowa Infantry - Maj William Thompson; 20th Wisconsin Infantry - Col Henry Bertram; 94th Illinois Infantry - Col John McNulta; Battery B, 1st Missouri Light Artillery - Cpt Martin Welfey
Second Division; MG Napoleon J. T. Dana	Attached	15th Maine Infantry – Ltc Benjamin Murray, Jr.; 1st Engineers, Corps D'Afrique – Col John Hodge; 16th Infantry, Corps D'Afrique – Col Matthew Kempsey; 1st Texas Cavalry – Col Edmund J. Davis; Pioneer Company – Cpt Alden H. Jumper

=== Confederate District of Texas, New Mexico & Arizona ===
Maj Gen John B. Magruder

1st Division - Brigadier General Hamilton P. Bee

- 33rd Texas Cavalry - Colonel James Duff
  - Company A - Cpt Richard Taylor
  - Company B
  - Company E
  - Company F - Cpt Henry T. Davis
- Vidal's Volunteer Company - Cpt Adrian J. Vidal (consisted mostly of conscripted Tejanos, defected to the Federals)
- Cummings Volunteer Company

== Bibliography ==
- Banks, Raymond H. (2025). General Nathaniel Prentice Banks: The War Years (Southern Texas coast section). Orlando: R.H. Banks. p. 778. ISBN 979-8-218-83208-7.
- Dupree, Stephen A. (2008). Planting the Union Flag in Texas. College Station: Texas A & M University Press. p. 293. ISBN 978-1585446414.
- Frazier, Donald S. (2020). Tempest over Texas: The Fall and Winter Campaigns of 1863-1864. Kerrville: State House Press. p. 505. ISBN 978-1-933337-83-8.
