= Henry D. Washburn =

19th-century American military officer and politician

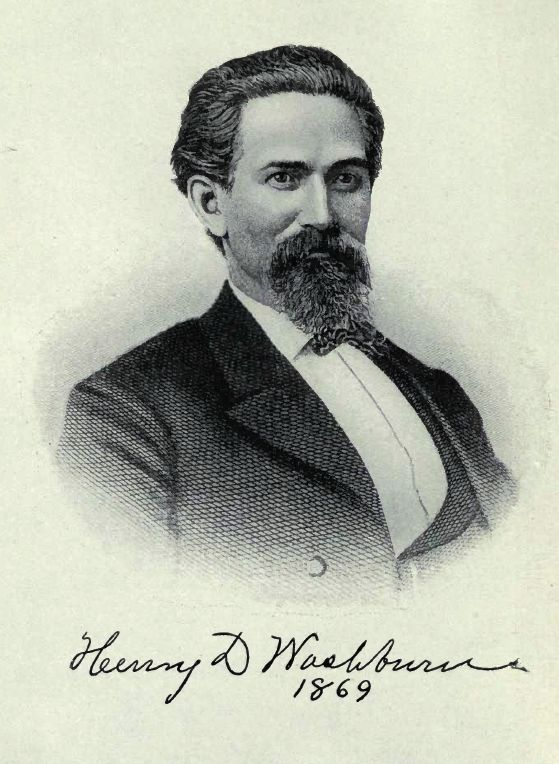
- Born: Henry Dana Washburn; March 28, 1832; Woodstock, Vermont
- Died: January 26, 1871 (aged 38); Clinton, Indiana
- Burial place: Riverside Cemetery, Clinton, Indiana
- Military career
- Allegiance: United States of America; Union
- Branch: United States Army; Union Army
- Rank: Brevet Major General; Brevet Brigadier General; Colonel
- Conflicts: American Civil War: Battle of Pea Ridge; Siege of Vicksburg; Battle of Fort Esperanza; Battle of Opequon; Battle of Cedar Creek

Henry Dana Washburn (March 28, 1832 – January 26, 1871) was a U.S. representative from Indiana and a colonel and was breveted twice as brigadier general and major general in the Union Army during the American Civil War.

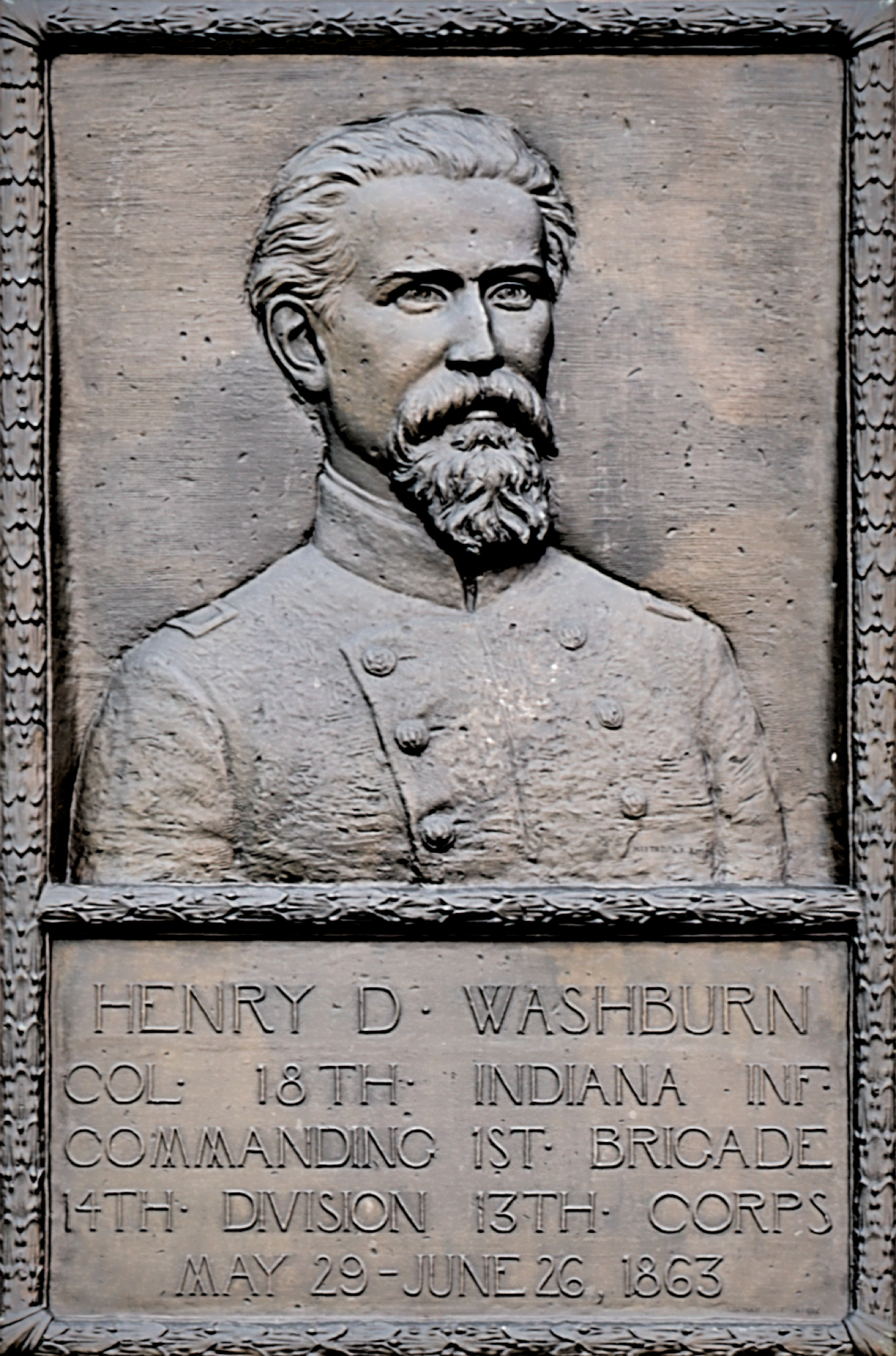
Relief portrait by Theo Alice Ruggles Kitson at Vicksburg National Military Park

== Biography ==
Born in Woodstock, Vermont, Washburn attended the common schools. He became a tanner and a currier, and taught school for several years. He moved to Vermillion County, Indiana, in 1850. He graduated from the New York State and National Law School and was admitted to the bar in 1853. He commenced the practice of law in Newport, Indiana. Entering politics, he served as the county auditor from 1854 to 1861.

=== Civil War ===
With the outbreak of the Civil War, he enlisted in the Union Army on August 16, 1861, serving as lieutenant colonel of the Eighteenth Regiment, Indiana Volunteer Infantry. He distinguished himself at the Battle of Pea Ridge by leading the 18th Indiana in a counterattack to recapture two guns lost from the Peoria battery. He was subsequently promoted to colonel and given command of the regiment on July 15, 1862.

After garrisoning Missouri for the fall and winter, the 18th Indiana was attached to Grant’s army endeavoring to cross the Mississippi and seize Vicksburg. The 18th Indiana fought at Port Gibson and Champion Hill and took part in the siege operations around Vicksburg, where he commanded a brigade commended for valorous actions during the initial assault upon the enemy fortress in May 1863. After the successful end of the Vicksburg operation, Washburn's brigade remained with the XIII Army Corps involved in operations up the Teche River, and the successful capture of several Rebel forts. In January 1864, the 18th Indiana was sent to Virginia where it participated in several stiff skirmishes. In August 1864, the 18th Indiana was attached to the 4th Brigade, 2nd Division (Grover) of Emory’s XIX Army Corps.

During Sheridan’s campaign to clear the Shenandoah Valley, Washburn commanded the 4th Brigade during heavy fighting at the battles of Opequon, Fisher's Hill and Cedar Creek. On December 12, 1864, President Abraham Lincoln nominated Washburn for appointment to the grade of brevet brigadier general of volunteers, to rank from December 15, 1864, and the United States Senate confirmed the appointment on February 14, 1865. In the winter of 1864–5, the Nineteenth Corps garrisoned the Savannah area while engaged in raids into Rebel held areas. He mustered out August 26, 1865. On May 4, 1866, President Andrew Johnson nominated Washburn for appointment to the grade of brevet major general of volunteers, to rank from March 13, 1865, for gallant and meritorious service during the war and the United States Senate confirmed the appointment on May 18, 1866.

=== Congress ===
Following the war, Washburn resumed his law practice and returned to politics. He successfully contested as a Republican the election of Daniel W. Voorhees to the Thirty-ninth Congress. He was reelected to the Fortieth Congress and served from February 23, 1866, to March 3, 1869. He was not a candidate for renomination in 1868 to the Forty-first Congress.

=== After Congress ===
He was appointed surveyor general of Montana in 1869 and served until his death. In 1870 he headed the Washburn-Langford-Doane Expedition to explore what would become Yellowstone National Park. Mount Washburn, located within the park, is named for him.

=== Death and burial ===
Washburn returned to Clinton, Indiana, where he died on January 26, 1871. He was interred in Riverside Cemetery.

== See also ==
List of American Civil War brevet generals (Union)

U.S. House of Representatives
| Preceded by Daniel W. Voorhees | Member of the U.S. House of Representatives from Indiana's 7th congressional district February 23, 1866 – March 3, 1869 | Succeeded by Godlove S. Orth |
