= 1st Missouri Infantry Regiment =

1st Missouri Infantry Regiment may refer to:

- 1st Missouri Infantry Regiment (Union), a Union regiment during the American Civil War
- 1st Missouri Infantry Regiment (Confederate), a Confederate regiment during the American Civil War
- 1st Missouri Colored Infantry Regiment, a Union African-American regiment during the American Civil War
- 1st Missouri US Reserve Corps Infantry Regiment, a Union regiment during the American Civil War
- 1st Missouri State Militia Infantry Battalion, a Union militia unit during the American Civil War

== See also ==
- 1st and 4th Missouri Infantry (Consolidated)
- 1st Missouri Cavalry Regiment (disambiguation)
- 1st Missouri Engineer Regiment, a Union unit during the American Civil War
- 1st Missouri Light Artillery Regiment, a Union regiment created by converting the 1st Missouri Infantry Regiment (Union) to artillery
- First Missouri Brigade, a Confederate brigade in the American Civil War
