= 4th Missouri Infantry Regiment =

4th Missouri Infantry can refer to:

- 4th Missouri Infantry Regiment (Confederate)
- 4th Missouri Infantry Regiment (Union, 3 months), a unit that existed in 1861
- 4th Missouri Infantry Regiment (Union, 3 years), a unit that existed 1862–1863
- 4th Missouri Colored Infantry Regiment

== See also ==
- 1st and 4th Missouri Infantry Regiment (Consolidated)
- 4th Missouri Cavalry Regiment
