= List of Union units from Missouri in the American Civil War =

This is a list of regiments from Missouri that fought in the Union Army during the American Civil War (1861–1865). The list of Missouri Confederate Civil War units is shown separately.

== Long-Enlistment Infantry Regiments ==
- 1st Missouri Volunteer Infantry - Reorganized as batteries of 1st Missouri Lt Arty
- 2nd Missouri Volunteer Infantry
- 3rd Missouri Volunteer Infantry
- 3rd Missouri US Reserve Corps Infantry - "Turner Zouaves"
- 4th Missouri Volunteer Infantry
- 5th Missouri Volunteer Infantry
- 6th Missouri Volunteer Infantry - "Bates Guards"
- 7th Missouri Volunteer Infantry - "The Irish Regiment", "The Irish Seventh"
- 8th Missouri Volunteer Infantry - "American Zouaves"
- 9th Missouri Volunteer Infantry - "Washington Zouaves"
- 10th Missouri Volunteer Infantry
- 11th Missouri Volunteer Infantry
- 12th Missouri Volunteer Infantry
- 13th Missouri Volunteer Infantry
- Western Sharpshooters-14th Missouri Volunteer Infantry - (formerly) Birge's Western Sharpshooters (later 66th Illinois Volunteer Infantry Regiment (Western Sharpshooters))
- 15th Missouri Volunteer Infantry
- 16th Missouri Volunteer Infantry - Failed to complete organization
- 17th Missouri Volunteer Infantry - "Western Turner Rifles"
- 18th Missouri Volunteer Infantry
- 19th Missouri Volunteer Infantry - Failed to complete organization
- 20th Missouri Volunteer Infantry - Failed to complete organization
- 21st Missouri Volunteer Infantry
- 22nd Missouri Volunteer Infantry
- 23rd Missouri Volunteer Infantry
- 24th Missouri Volunteer Infantry - The Lyon Legion
- 25th Missouri Volunteer Infantry
- 26th Missouri Volunteer Infantry
- 27th Missouri Volunteer Infantry
- 27th Missouri Volunteer Mounted Infantry
- 28th Missouri Volunteer Infantry - Failed to complete organization
- 29th Missouri Volunteer Infantry
- 30th Missouri Volunteer Infantry - "Shamrock Regiment" (second Missouri Irish Regiment)
- 31st Missouri Volunteer Infantry
- 32nd Missouri Volunteer Infantry
- 33rd Missouri Volunteer Infantry
- 34th Missouri Volunteer Infantry - Failed to complete organization
- 35th Missouri Volunteer Infantry
- 36th Missouri Volunteer Infantry
- 37th Missouri Volunteer Infantry - Failed to complete organization
- 38th Missouri Volunteer Infantry - Failed to complete organization
- 39th Missouri Volunteer Infantry
- 40th Missouri Volunteer Infantry
- 41st Missouri Volunteer Infantry
- 42nd Missouri Volunteer Infantry
- 43rd Missouri Volunteer Infantry
- 44th Missouri Volunteer Infantry
- 45th Missouri Volunteer Infantry
- 46th Missouri Volunteer Infantry
- 47th Missouri Volunteer Infantry
- 48th Missouri Volunteer Infantry
- 49th Missouri Volunteer Infantry
- 50th Missouri Volunteer Infantry
- 51st Missouri Volunteer Infantry
- 52nd Missouri Volunteer Infantry
- 53rd Missouri Volunteer Infantry
- 54th Missouri Volunteer Infantry
- 56th Missouri Volunteer Infantry

== Short-Enlistment Infantry Regiments ==
- 1st Missouri Volunteer Infantry (3 Months, 1861)
- 2nd Missouri Volunteer Infantry (3 months, 1861)
- 3rd Missouri Volunteer Infantry (3 months, 1861) "Lyon's Fahnenwacht" (Lyon's Color Guard)
- 4th Missouri Volunteer Infantry (3 months, 1861) "Schwarze Jäger" (Black Hunters, aka Black Rifle Hunters)
- 5th Missouri Volunteer Infantry (3 months, 1861)

- 1st Northeast Regiment of Missouri Infantry, 1861
- 2nd Northeast Regiment of Missouri Infantry, 1861

- 1st Missouri, US Reserve Corps Infantry (3 months, 1861)
- 2nd Missouri, US Reserve Corps Infantry (3 months, 1861)
- 3rd Missouri, US Reserve Corps Infantry (3 months, 1861) "Turner-Zuaven" (Turner Zouaves)
- 4th Missouri, US Reserve Corps Infantry (3 months, 1861)
- 5th Missouri, US Reserve Corps Infantry (3 months, 1861)

== Early War Home Guard Organizations ==
- Fourteenth Missouri Volunteers (Lafayette County Home Guard)
- Adair County Home Guard Company Infantry (Mounted)
- Adair County Home Guard Company Infantry
- Allen's Citizens Corps Home Guard (Calhoun, Henry Co)
- Benton County Home Guard Regiment Infantry
- Boonville Battalion Home Guard Infantry
- Brookfield Company Home Guard Infantry (Linn Co)
- Caldwell County Company Home Guard Infantry
- Cape Girardeau Battalion Home Guard Infantry
- Carondelet County Company Home Guard Infantry
- Cass County Regiment Home Guard Infantry
- Clinton County Company Home Guard Infantry (Org by BG Lyon)
- Clinton County Company Home Guard Infantry (Org by Col Tuttle)
- Cole County Regiment Home Guard Infantry
- Dallas County Regiment Home Guard Infantry
- De Kalb County Regiment Home Guard Infantry
- De Doto County Company Home Guard Infantry
- Douglas County Company Home Guard Infantry
- Franklin County Regiment Home Guard Infantry
- Fremont Rangers Home Guard Infantry (5 Companies)
- Gasconade County Battalion Home Guard Infantry (2nd)
- Greene County Company Home Guard Infantry
- Gentry County Regiment Home Guard Infantry
- Greene And Christian Counties Company Home Guard Infantry
- Harrison County Regiment Home Guard Infantry
- Jefferson City Battalion Home Guard Infantry
- Johnson County Regiment Home Guard Infantry
- King's Company Railroad Guard
- Knox County Regiment Home Guard Infantry
- Lawrence County Regiment Home Guard Infantry
- Lewis County Company Home Guard Infantry
- Lexington County Company Home Guard Infantry
- Livingston County Company Home Guard Infantry
- Marion County Battalion Home Guard Infantry
- Moniteau County Company Home Guard Infantry
- Nodaway County Regiment Home Guard Infantry
- Osage County Battalion Home Guard Infantry
- Osage County Regiment And Hickory County Battalion Home Guard Infantry
- Ozark County Regiment Home Guard Infantry
- Pacific Battalion (ink's) Home Guard Infantry
- Pettis County Regiment Home Guard Infantry
- Phelps County Company Home Guard Infantry (maries Co. Indpt. Company)
- Phelps County Company Home Guard Infantry (bennight's)
- Phelps' Regiment Of Home Guard Infantry (green County)
- Pike County Regiment Home Guard Infantry
- Pilot Knob Company Home Guard Infantry
- Polk County Regiment Home Guard Infantry
- Potosi County Regiment Home Guard Infantry
- Putnam County Home Guard Infantry - (2 Companies)
- St. Charles County Battalion Home Guard Infantry (krekel's)
- Scott County Battalion Home Guard Infantry
- Sibley Point Home Guard Company (adair County)
- Stonas Independent Company Ozark County Home Guard Infantry
- Stone Prairie (barry County) Company Home Guard Infantry
- Stone County Regiment Home Guard Infantry
- Shawneetown (putnam County) Home Guard Company Infantry
- Sullivan County Home Guard Infantry (2 Companies)
- Shelby County Company Home Guard Infantry
- Webster County Regiment Home Guard Infantry

== Enrolled Missouri Militia ==
- 1st Enrolled Missouri Militia
- 2nd Enrolled Missouri Militia
- 3rd Enrolled Missouri Militia
- 4th Enrolled Missouri Militia
- 5th Enrolled Missouri Militia
- 6th Enrolled Missouri Militia
- 7th Enrolled Missouri Militia
- 8th Enrolled Missouri Militia
- 9th Enrolled Missouri Militia
- 10th Enrolled Missouri Militia
- 11th Enrolled Missouri Militia
- 13th Enrolled Missouri Militia
- 16th Enrolled Missouri Militia
- 17th Enrolled Missouri Militia
- 22nd Enrolled Missouri Militia
- 23rd Enrolled Missouri Militia
- 24th Enrolled Missouri Militia
- 25th Enrolled Missouri Militia
- 26th Enrolled Missouri Militia
- 27th Enrolled Missouri Militia
- 28th Enrolled Missouri Militia
- 29th Enrolled Missouri Militia
- 30th Enrolled Missouri Militia
- 31st Enrolled Missouri Militia
- 32nd Enrolled Missouri Militia
- 33rd Enrolled Missouri Militia
- 34th Enrolled Missouri Militia
- 35th Enrolled Missouri Militia
- 36th Enrolled Missouri Militia
- 37th Enrolled Missouri Militia
- 38th Enrolled Missouri Militia
- 39th Enrolled Missouri Militia
- 40th Enrolled Missouri Militia
- 41st Enrolled Missouri Militia
- 42nd Enrolled Missouri Militia
- 43rd Enrolled Missouri Militia
- 44th Enrolled Missouri Militia
- 45th Enrolled Missouri Militia
- 46th Enrolled Missouri Militia
- 47th Enrolled Missouri Militia
- 48th Enrolled Missouri Militia
- 49th Enrolled Missouri Militia
- 50th Enrolled Missouri Militia
- 51st Enrolled Missouri Militia
- 52nd Enrolled Missouri Militia
- 53rd Enrolled Missouri Militia
- 54th Enrolled Missouri Militia
- 55th Enrolled Missouri Militia
- 56th Enrolled Missouri Militia
- 57th Enrolled Missouri Militia
- 58th Enrolled Missouri Militia
- 59th Enrolled Missouri Militia
- 60th Enrolled Missouri Militia
- 61st Enrolled Missouri Militia
- 62nd Enrolled Missouri Militia
- 63rd Enrolled Missouri Militia
- 64th Enrolled Missouri Militia
- 65th Enrolled Missouri Militia
- 66th Enrolled Missouri Militia
- 67th Enrolled Missouri Militia
- 68th Enrolled Missouri Militia
- 69th Enrolled Missouri Militia
- 70th Enrolled Missouri Militia
- 71st Enrolled Missouri Militia
- 72nd Enrolled Missouri Militia
- 73rd Enrolled Missouri Militia
- 74th Enrolled Missouri Militia
- 75th Enrolled Missouri Militia
- 76th Enrolled Missouri Militia
- 77th Enrolled Missouri Militia
- 78th Enrolled Missouri Militia
- 79th Enrolled Missouri Militia
- 80th Enrolled Missouri Militia
- 81st Enrolled Missouri Militia
- 82nd Enrolled Missouri Militia
- 83rd Enrolled Missouri Militia
- 84th Enrolled Missouri Militia
- 85th Enrolled Missouri Militia
- 86th Enrolled Missouri Militia
- 87th Enrolled Missouri Militia
- 88th Enrolled Missouri Militia
- 89th Enrolled Missouri Militia

== Provisional Enrolled Missouri Militia ==
- 1st Provisional Enrolled Missouri Militia
- 2nd Provisional Enrolled Missouri Militia
- 3rd Provisional Enrolled Missouri Militia
- 4th Provisional Enrolled Missouri Militia
- 5th Provisional Enrolled Missouri Militia
- 6th Provisional Enrolled Missouri Militia
- 7th Provisional Enrolled Missouri Militia
- 8th Provisional Enrolled Missouri Militia
- 9th Provisional Enrolled Missouri Militia

== Missouri State Militia ==
- 1st Battalion Missouri State Militia Infantry "Albins'"

Missouri State Militia Cavalry

- 1st Missouri State Militia Cavalry
- 1st Battalion Missouri State Militia Cavalry "Krekel's"
- 2nd Missouri State Militia Cavalry
- 2nd Battalion Missouri State Militia Cavalry
- 3rd Missouri State Militia Cavalry (Old)
- 3rd Missouri State Militia Cavalry (New)
- 5th Missouri State Militia Cavalry
- 5th Missouri State Militia Cavalry (Old)
- 5th Missouri State Militia Cavalry (New)
- 6th Missouri State Militia Cavalry
- 7th Missouri State Militia Cavalry
- 8th Missouri State Militia Cavalry
- 9th Missouri State Militia Cavalry
- 10th Missouri State Militia Cavalry
- 11th Missouri State Militia Cavalry
- 12th Missouri State Militia Cavalry
- 13th Missouri State Militia Cavalry
- 14th Missouri State Militia Cavalry

== Cavalry ==
- 1st Missouri Volunteer Cavalry
- 2nd Missouri Volunteer Cavalry - Merrill's Horse
- 3rd Missouri Volunteer Cavalry
- 4th Missouri Volunteer Cavalry
- 5th Missouri Volunteer Cavalry
- 6th Missouri Volunteer Cavalry
- 7th Missouri Volunteer Cavalry
- 8th Missouri Volunteer Cavalry
- 9th Missouri Volunteer Cavalry
- 10th Missouri Volunteer Cavalry
- 11th Missouri Volunteer Cavalry
- 12th Missouri Volunteer Cavalry
- 13th Missouri Volunteer Cavalry
- 14th Missouri Volunteer Cavalry
- 15th Missouri Volunteer Cavalry
- 16th Missouri Volunteer Cavalry
- 17th Missouri Volunteer Cavalry
- 18th Missouri Volunteer Cavalry

== Artillery ==
1st Missouri Light Artillery Regiment

- Battery A
- Battery B
- Battery C
- Battery D
- Battery E
- Battery F
- Battery G
- Battery H
- Battery I
- Battery K
- Battery L
- Battery M

2nd Missouri Light Artillery Regiment

- Battery A
- Battery B
- Battery C
- Battery D
- Battery E
- Battery F - Landgraeber's Battery of Horse Artillery
- Battery G
- Battery H
- Battery I
- Battery K
- Battery L
- Battery M

== Engineers ==
- 1st Regiment Missouri Volunteer Engineers
- Bissell's Engineer Regiment of the West
- Balz's Company of Sappers and Miners
- Gerster's Independent Company of Pioneers
- Smith's Independent Company of Missouri Telegraph Corps
- Voerster's Independent Company of Sappers and Miners

== Colored Infantry Regiments ==
- 1st Missouri Regiment of Colored Infantry - 62nd Regt United States Colored Troops
- 2nd Missouri Regiment of Colored Infantry - 65th Regt United States Colored Troops
- 3rd Missouri Regiment of Colored Infantry - 67th Regt United States Colored Troops
- 4th Missouri Regiment of Colored Infantry - 68th Regt United States Colored Troops
- 18th U.S. Colored Infantry - Organized in Missouri "At Large"

== See also ==
- Lists of American Civil War Regiments by State
- List of Missouri Confederate Civil War units
- United States Colored Troops
