= 5th Missouri Infantry Regiment (Union, 3 years) =

- Active: March 18, 1862, to November 22, 1862
- Country: United States
- Allegiance: Union
- Branch: Infantry
- Engagements: Guard Duty, St. Louis & Iron Mountain Railroad; Garrison duty, Cape Girardeau

The 5th Missouri Infantry Regiment was an infantry regiment that served in the Union Army during the American Civil War.

== Service ==
The 5th Missouri Infantry Regiment was organized at St. Louis in March 1862 It was constructed by Major General Henry W. Halleck's consolidation of 5th United States Reserve Corps, Gerster's Pioneer Company, Winkelman's Pontoneer Company and Voerster's Company of Sappers and Miners.

The regiment had a quiet war, performing garrison duty and patrolling within Missouri. Their first mission was guarding bridges on St. Louis & Iron Mountain Railroad and patrolling in southeast Missouri until July. Company "F" was detailed in the District of Mississippi in July. The rest of the regiment was transferred to Cape Girardeau until November, 1862.

In November the regiment was disassembled. Companies "A" and "I" were transferred to the 35th Missouri Volunteer Infantry. Companies "H" and "K" were transferred to the 27th Missouri Volunteer Infantry. Companies "B," "C," "D," "E," "F" and "G" were mustered out November 22, 1862, ending the existence of the regiment.

== Commanders ==
- Colonel Samuel A. Foster

== See also ==
- Missouri Civil War Union units
- Missouri in the Civil War
