= Ferryville =

Ferryville may refer to:

- Ferryville, Wisconsin, United States
- Ferryville (Menzel Bourguiba), Tunisia
