= 2nd Missouri Infantry Regiment =

2nd Missouri Infantry Regiment may refer to:

- 2nd Missouri Infantry Regiment (Confederate), a Confederate regiment during the American Civil War
- 2nd Missouri Infantry Regiment (Union), a Union regiment during the American Civil War
- 2nd Missouri Colored Infantry Regiment, a Union regiment during the American Civil War

== See also ==
- 2nd Missouri Cavalry Regiment, a Union regiment during the American Civil War
- 2nd Missouri Light Artillery Regiment, a Union regiment during the American Civil War
