= Hugh Porter (politician) =

19th century American politician

Member of the Wisconsin State Assembly from the Crawford district
- In office January 2, 1899 – January 7, 1901
- Preceded by: James O. Davidson
- Succeeded by: John A. Haggerty
- In office January 3, 1887 – January 5, 1891
- Preceded by: Thomas Curley
- Succeeded by: Ambrose Thompson

Personal details
- Born: September 23, 1843 Morgan County, Ohio, U.S.
- Died: August 1, 1936 (aged 92) Viroqua, Wisconsin, U.S.
- Resting place: Viroqua Cemetery, Viroqua, Wisconsin
- Party: Republican
- Spouse: Mary Alice Cron (died 1934)
- Children: Justin Adelbert Porter^{(b. 1870; died 1932)}; Adelaide "Addie" (McIntosh)^{(b. 1870; died 1932)}; John Porter^{(died after 1936)}
- Occupation: Farmer

Military service
- Allegiance: United States
- Branch/service: United States Volunteers; Union Army
- Years of service: 1865
- Rank: Corporal, USV
- Unit: 49th Reg. Wis. Vol. Infantry
- Battles/wars: American Civil War

Hugh Porter (September 23, 1843 – August 1, 1936) was an American farmer and Republican politician from the U.S. state of Wisconsin. He was a member of the Wisconsin State Assembly for three terms, representing Crawford County.

== Biography ==
Hugh Porter was born in Morgan County, Ohio, on September 23, 1843. He came west with his parents at age 12 to the town of Newport, in Columbia County, Wisconsin. The family then briefly moved to Allamakee County, Iowa, before settling more permanently in the town of Seneca, Crawford County, Wisconsin, in the Fall of 1855.

In the last year of the American Civil War, he volunteered for service and was enrolled as a private in Company F of the 49th Wisconsin Infantry Regiment. He was promoted to corporal before the regiment was mustered out in November 1865. His regiment didn't see any combat, and was solely tasked with logistics and provost duties in Missouri.

He was elected chairman of the town board and president of the Crawford County Agricultural Society before running for Wisconsin State Assembly in 1886. He won two consecutive terms in the Assembly, in 1886 and 1888, running on the Republican Party ticket; he was not a candidate in 1890.

He was elected to a third and final term in the Assembly in the 1898 election, serving in the 1899 session. He did not run again in 1900.

After leaving the Assembly, he moved to Viroqua, Wisconsin, where he resided for the rest of his life. There, in 1905, he was a co-founder of the Viroqua Co-Operative Creamery and served for several years on the board of directors.

He died at his home in Viroqua on August 1, 1836.

== Electoral history ==
=== Wisconsin Assembly (1886, 1888) ===
Wisconsin Assembly, Crawford District Election, 1886
Party	Candidate	Votes	%	±%
General Election, November 2, 1886
Republican	Hugh Porter	1,671	56.80%	+7.25%
Democratic	Thomas W. Tower	1,271	43.20%	−9.70%
Plurality		400	13.60%	+12.69%
Total votes		2,942	100.0%	-8.03%
Republican gain from Democratic				

Wisconsin Assembly, Crawford District Election, 1888
Party	Candidate	Votes	%	±%
General Election, November 6, 1888
Republican	Hugh Porter (incumbent)	1,829	53.06%	−3.74%
Democratic	James A. Robb	1,559	45.23%	+2.03%
Prohibition	Thomas W. Gay	59	1.71%	
Plurality		270	7.83%	-5.76%
Total votes		3,447	100.0%	+17.17%
Republican hold				

=== Wisconsin Assembly (1898) ===
Wisconsin Assembly, Crawford District Election, 1898
Party	Candidate	Votes	%	±%
General Election, November 8, 1898
Republican	Hugh Porter	1,828	60.11%	+1.08%
Democratic	Peter N. Peterson	1,213	39.89%	
Plurality		615	20.22%	+2.17%
Total votes		3,041	100.0%	-20.89%
Republican hold				

Wisconsin State Assembly
Preceded by Thomas Curley	Member of the Wisconsin State Assembly from the Crawford district January 3, 1887 – January 5, 1891	Succeeded by Ambrose Thompson
Preceded by James O. Davidson	Member of the Wisconsin State Assembly from the Crawford district January 2, 1899 – January 7, 1901	Succeeded by John A. Haggerty
