= Gerster's Independent Company of Pioneers =

- Active: August 1861 to December 18, 1862
- Country: United States
- Allegiance: United States of America; Union
- Branch: Engineers
- Engagements: Frémont's Southwest Campaign; Advance on Springfield

Commanders
- First Commander: Captain Anton Gerster

The Gerster's Independent Company of Pioneers was an independent company of military engineers that served in the Union Army during the American Civil War.

The Company was organized in St. Louis, Missouri organized under the authority of Major General John C. Frémont. The unit was organized by Captain Anton Gerster, a professional engineer and a veteran of the 1848-48 Hungarian War of Independence. The company was intended to provide engineering and pioneer support to the Army of the West operating at that time in the state of Missouri.

== Service ==
Attached to Army of the West and Unattached District of Southwest Missouri, Dept. of Missouri, to September, 1862. Fremont's Campaign against Springfield, Mo., September to November, 1861. Duty at Jefferson City, Rolla and Springfield, Mo., until December 29, 1861. Advance to Springfield, Mo., and the Southwest December 29, 1861, to February 14, 1862. Duty in District of Southwest Missouri until September, 1862.

On March 8, 1862, Special Orders No. 43 of the Adjutant General of Missouri ordered Gerster's Independent Company of Pioneers consolidated with other units to form the 5th Missouri Volunteer Infantry.

On December 18, 1862, Captain Gerster's company, now known as Company "H", 5th Missouri Volunteer Infantry, was reassigned, becoming Company "H", 27th Missouri Volunteer Infantry. The history of Gerster's company merges with the 27th Missouri from this point.

The members of the company remaining in the 27th Missouri Volunteer Infantry were mustered out on May 15, 1865.

== Commanders ==
- Captain Anton Gerster
- 1st Lt John Kies
- 1st Lt Gottlieb Bumgart
- 2nd Lt William E. Ware
- 2nd Lt Thomas F. Haskell

== See also ==
- Missouri Civil War Union units

== Notes and references ==
- Dyer, Frederick H. A Compendium of the War of the Rebellion (Des Moines, IA: Dyer Pub. Co.), 1908.
