= 3rd Missouri Cavalry Regiment =

3rd Missouri Cavalry Regiment may refer to:

- 3rd Missouri Cavalry Regiment (Confederate), a regiment in the Confederate States Army
- 3rd Missouri Cavalry Regiment (Union), a regiment in the Union Army

== See also ==
- 3rd Missouri Infantry Regiment (disambiguation)
