= 3rd Missouri Infantry Regiment =

The 3rd Missouri Infantry Regiment may refer to:

- 3rd Missouri Infantry Regiment (Confederate), Confederate regiment during the American Civil War
- 3rd Missouri Infantry Regiment (Union), Union regiment during the American Civil War
- 3rd Missouri Colored Infantry Regiment, Union regiment during the American Civil War
- 3rd Missouri US Reserve Corps Infantry Regiment, Union regiment during the American Civil War

== See also ==
- 3rd Missouri Cavalry Regiment (disambiguation)
