= Battery G, 1st Missouri Light Artillery Regiment =

- Active: September 1, 1861 to July 28, 1865
- Country: United States
- Allegiance: (United States) Union Missouri
- Branch: Union Army
- Type: Field Artillery
- Size: Battery
- Engagements: Battle of Island No. 10; Siege of Corinth; Battle of Perryville; Battle of Stones River; Tullahoma Campaign; Battle of Chickamauga; Siege of Chattanooga; Battle of Lookout Mountain; Battle of Missionary Ridge

Commanders
- Notable commanders: Henry Hescock

Battery G, 1st Missouri Light Artillery Regiment was an artillery battery from Missouri that served in the Union Army during the American Civil War. The battery was often referred to as Hescock's Battery. The battery formed part of the defense of Philip Sheridan's division at the Battle of Stones River. Other battles in which it served were Island No. 10, Corinth (Siege), Perryville, Tullahoma Campaign, Chickamauga, Lookout Mountain, and Missionary Ridge. It spent the remainder of the war in garrison at Chattanooga and was mustered out in July 1865.

== Service ==
The regiment and its batteries were organized at St. Louis, Missouri from the 1st Missouri Infantry Regiment and mustered in for a three-year enlistment on September 1, 1861, under the command of Captain Henry Hescock.

The battery was attached to the Army of the West and Department of the Missouri, until March 1862. Artillery, 3rd Division, Army of the Mississippi, to April 1862. Artillery, 1st Division, Army of the Mississippi, to June 1862. Artillery, 5th Division, Army of the Mississippi, to September 1862. Artillery, 11th Division, Army of the Ohio, September 1862. Artillery, 11th Division, III Corps, Army of the Ohio, to November 1862. 2nd Brigade. 3rd Division, Right Wing, XIV Corps, Army of the Cumberland, to January 1863. Artillery, 3rd Division, XX Corps, Army of the Cumberland, to October 1863. Artillery. 2nd Division, IV Corps, Army of the Cumberland, to April 1864. Artillery Chattanooga, Tennessee, Department of the Cumberland, to November 1864. 1st Brigade, 1st Separate Division, District of the Etowah, Department of the Cumberland, to July 1865.

Battery G, 1st Missouri Light Artillery mustered out of service at Chattanooga, Tennessee on July 28, 1865.

== Detailed service ==
Fremont's Campaign in Missouri October–November 1861. Ordered to Commerce, Mo., February 1862. Operations against New Madrid, Mo., and Island No. 10, Mississippi River, February 28-April 8. Expedition to Fort Pillow, Tenn., April 13–17. Moved to Hamburg Landing, Tenn., April 18–22. Advance on and siege of Corinth, Miss., April 29-May 30. Actions at Farmington, Miss., May 3 and 9. Occupation of Corinth and pursuit to Booneville May 30-June 12 Moved to Cincinnati, Ohio, August 26-September 4, thence to Louisville, Ky., September 12–19. Pursuit of Bragg into Kentucky October 1–16. Battle of Perryville, Ky., October 8. March to Nashville, Tenn., October 16-November 7, and duty there until December 26. Advance on Murfreesboro December 26–30. Battle of Stones River December 30–31, 1862 and January 1–3, 1863. Duty at Murfreesboro until June. Expedition toward Columbia March 4–14. Tullahoma Campaign June 23-July 7. Occupation of middle Tennessee until August 16. Passage of Cumberland Mountains and Tennessee River and Chickamauga Campaign August 16-September 22. Battle of Chickamauga, Ga., September 19–20. Siege of Chattanooga, Tenn., September 24-November 23. Battles of Chattanooga November 23–25. Post and garrison duty at Chattanooga, Tenn., until July 1865.

== Commanders ==
- Captain Henry Hescock
- Lieutenant Gustavus Schueler - commanded at the battle of Chickamauga

== See also ==
- Missouri Civil War Union units
- Missouri in the Civil War
