= Spottswood Rice =

American AME minister (1819–1907)

- Born: November 1819; Madison County, Virginia, U.S.
- Died: October 31, 1907 (aged 88); Colorado Springs, Colorado, U.S.
- Occupations: Minister, army chaplain, letter writer
- Spouse(s): Arry, Eliza

Spottswood Rice (November 1819 – October 31, 1907) was a minister in the African Methodist Episcopal (AME) church and a private in the Union Army during the US Civil War. Rice is most famous for a pair of forcefully written letters to the owner of his wife and children during the war while he was stationed in St. Louis and they were enslaved in Howard County, Missouri. The letters expressed his desire to be reunited with his family and his anger at his wife's owners. Later, he was ordained a minister in the AME church and served congregations in Missouri, New Mexico, and Colorado. In 1882, he founded the first AME church in New Mexico.

== Early life ==
Spottswood Rice was born a slave in Madison County, Virginia in November 1819. At a very early age his owner moved with his parents to Howard County, Missouri.

In Missouri, Rice married Arry or Orry Ferguson. As it was a slave marriage, the exact date was not well recorded and may have been in 1852 or in July 1844. Arry was born in Fauquier County, Virginia, and they had seven or eight children, at least five of which reached adulthood. One son was killed in the civil war, another died in St. Louis in 1919, and the third died in Colorado Springs in October 1925. One daughter, Mary, was born in Missouri on May 1, 1852 and married in 1882. Mary was interviewed and provided a slave narrative for the Works Progress Administration Writer's Program.

== Slavery ==
Before emancipation, Rice's wife and all of his children were owned by a single woman named Kitty Diggs. Rice was owned by a tobacco plantation owner named Benjamin Lewis, where Rice was the head slave on the plantation, and cured and rolled the tobacco. Lewis' son taught Rice to read, to the chagrin of the elder Lewis. He was only allowed to visit Arry and his family two days a week, Wednesdays and Saturdays. He was frequently beaten by his owner. One time he tried to escape. During his escape, he hid in the woods and under houses, but after three days he gave up. He turned himself in to a slave trader he knew who promised to buy him from Lewis. However, Lewis would not sell Rice, and he was forced to remain on the plantation.

The Emancipation Proclamation was published January 1, 1863. Rice read about it in the newspapers to the other slaves on the Lewis plantation. Lewis greatly valued Rice on the plantation: in fact, he tried to convince Rice to stay and run the farm and to convince the other slaves to stay as well. Rice remained for six months, but then left the plantation with eleven other slaves and joined the Union Army in Kansas City. Patrols hunting for Lewis' slaves were turned away when they approached the Union camps, as they were no longer slaves but were Union soldiers.

== Civil War ==
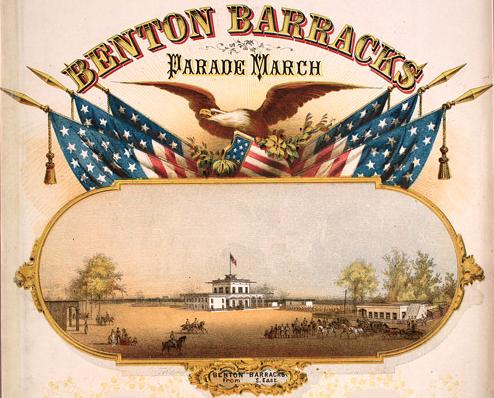
Benton Barracks Parade March.

Rice enlisted on February 9, 1864, near Glasgow, Missouri, joining as a private in Company A of the 67th United States Colored Infantry Regiment.

During parts of his service, Rice was hospitalized at Benton Barracks near St. Louis, Missouri for chronic rheumatism. While there in September 1864, Rice wrote two letters, one to his daughters who were still enslaved in Howard County and the other to Kitty Diggs, their owner. He wrote passionately of his desire to free them, writing, "be assured that I will have you if it cost me my life." In defiance of Diggs' wish to keep the girls, he said, "She is the first Christian that I ever heard say that a man could steal his own children, especially out of human bondage." He believed that 800 white and 800 black Union soldiers would come to the plantation and rescue them. Kitty's brother, F. W. Diggs, wrote to General Rosecrans, then commander of the Department of the Missouri, arguing that Kitty's loyalty should guarantee the children remaining her slaves.

Rice was a very religious man, and his obituary notes he was a chaplain in the Army. It is unclear if this was an official designation. Rice was mustered out of service in May 1865 and continued to live in St. Louis. Immediately after the war, Rice worked as a nurse at Benton Barracks and his wife was a laundress. His children attended their first schools on Benton Barracks, but later attended newly created schools for blacks in the city.

== Ministry ==
He joined the African Methodist Church of St. Louis, and became licensed as a local preacher, being ordained deacon in 1870 or 1874. In 1871, he had charge of the Savannah, Missouri Mission. He was ordained an Elder in 1876, when he was pastor of the Washington, Missouri Circuit. In 1879 he was transferred to Canton, Missouri. In 1881 he was pastor of St. Peter's Chapel, in St. Louis. In 1882 he was transferred to the State Line Church, in Kansas City, Missouri, a part of the Kansas Congress. In October 1882, he was appointed to pastor of the church at Parsons, Kansas.

Later in the 1880s, Rice founded the first AME mission in New Mexico which became Grant Chapel AME. On March 19, 1888, Arry died. Rice later remarried. By 1901, he had moved to Colorado Springs where he founded another church. Rice died on October 31, 1907.
