= Battery D, 1st Missouri Light Artillery Regiment =

- Active: Before Feb. 1862 – 11 April 1865
- Country: United States
- Allegiance: (United States) Union Missouri
- Branch: Union Army
- Type: Field Artillery
- Size: Battery
- Equipment: 3 M1841 6-pounder field guns, 2 M1841 12-pounder howitzers, 2 3-inch Ordnance rifles, 1 M1841 24-pounder howitzer
- Engagements: American Civil War; Battle of Fort Henry (1862); Battle of Fort Donelson (1862); Battle of Shiloh (1862); Siege of Corinth (1862); Second Battle of Corinth (1862); Battle of Missionary Ridge (1863); Knoxville campaign (1863)

Commanders
- Notable commanders: Henry Richardson

Battery D, 1st Missouri Light Artillery Regiment was an artillery battery that served in the Union Army during the American Civil War. Organized before February 1862, Battery D fought at Fort Henry, Fort Donelson, Shiloh, Corinth siege, Corinth, and Missionary Ridge. After serving in the Knoxville campaign, the battery garrisoned Huntsville, Alabama until April 1865. At that time it was consolidated with Battery C, 1st Missouri Light Artillery Regiment which was mustered out in July 1865.

== Organizations ==
Attached to 3rd Brigade, 2nd Division, District of Cairo, February, 1862. 3rd Brigade, 2nd Division, District of West Tennessee, Army of the Tennessee, to April, 1862. Artillery, 2nd Division, Army Tennessee, to July, 1862. Artillery, 2nd Division, District of Corinth, Miss., to November, 1862. Artillery, District of Corinth, Miss., 13th Army Corps (Old), Dept. of the Tennessee, to December, 1862. Artillery, District of Corinth, Miss., 17th Army Corps, to January, 1863. Artillery, District of Corinth, 16th Army Corps, to March, 1863. Artillery, 2nd Division, 16th Army Corps, to September, 1863. Artillery, 4th Division, 15th Army Corps, to April, 1864. Artillery Reserve, Huntsville, Ala., Dept. of the Cumberland, to May, 1864. Artillery, 3rd Division, 15th Army Corps, to September, 1864. Artillery, Huntsville, Ala., Dept. of the Cumberland, to April, 1865.

== History ==
Duty in the Dept. of Missouri until February, 1862. Operations against Fort Henry, Tenn., February 2–6. Investment and capture of Fort Donelson, Tenn.. February 12–16. Expedition to Clarksville, Tenn., February 19-March 6. Moved to Pittsburg Landing, Tenn., March 6–17. Battle of Shiloh, Tenn., April 6–7. Advance on and siege of Corinth, Miss., April 29-May 30. Duty at Corinth until October. Battle of Corinth October 3–4. Pursuit to Hatchie River October 5–12. Duty at Corinth until April, 1863. Dodge's Expedition to Northern Alabama April 15-May 8. Rock Cut, near Tuscumbia, April 22. Tuscumbia April 23. Town Creek April 28. Duty at Corinth until September. March with 15th Army Corps to Chattanooga, Tenn., October–November. Operations on Memphis & Charleston Railroad in Alabama October 20–29. Battles of Chattanooga November 23–25; Tunnel Hill November 23–24; Mission Ridge November 25. March to relief of Knoxville November 28-December 8. Moved to Huntsville, Ala., and duty there until October, 1864. Decatur, Ala., October 27–29. Garrison duty at Huntsville, Ala., until April, 1865. Consolidated with Battery "C" April 11, 1865.

== See also ==
- List of Missouri Union Civil War units
