= 1st Missouri State Militia Infantry Battalion =

1st Missouri State Cavalry Battalion (Militia)
- Active: March 26 – November 11, 1862
- Disbanded: November 11, 1862
- Country: United States
- Allegiance: Union
- Branch: Cavalry
- Type: Militia
- Size: Battalion
- Engagements: American Civil War

The 1st Missouri State Militia Infantry Battalion was a militia infantry battalion from Missouri that served in the Union Army between March 26 and November 11, 1862, during the American Civil War. It later formed Companies A–F of the 1st Missouri State Militia Cavalry Regiment

== Service ==
The battalion was recruited at St. Charles, Missouri on March 26, 1862. Once officially recognized by the United States Military, it was attached to the District of Central Missouri, Department of Missouri. On September 4, the battalion sent scouts to Callaway County and Prairie Station. The battalion saw duty at St. Charles, Missouri, while operating against guerrillas in that area until the first few days of November 1862. During its service, the battalion incurred one enlisted soldier fatality (killed), and twelve men died of disease.

== See also ==
- List of Missouri Union Civil War units

== Bibliography ==
- Dyer, Frederick H. (1959). A Compendium of the War of the Rebellion. New York and London. Thomas Yoseloff, Publisher. LCCN 59-12963.
