= Adair County Home Guard Company Infantry (Mounted) =

- State flag of Missouri
- Active: May, 1861 - October, 1861
- Allegiance: United States; Missouri
- Branch: Union Army
- Type: Home Guard (Union)
- Size: Company
- Engagements: Battle of Blue Mills Landing

The Adair County Home Guard Company Infantry (Mounted), was a Home Guard Company that served in the Missouri Home Guard in the American Civil War.

== Service ==
The company was formed in May 1861. The company conducted duty in the counties of Adair, Shelby, Monroe, Mercer, Marion, Linn, Livingston, Clinton, and Clay. The company took part in the pursuit of Green's forces with the 3rd Iowa Infantry from August 15–21.

The company took part in the Battle of Blue Mills Landing.

The company was mustered out of service in October 1861.

== See also ==
- List of Union units from Missouri in the American Civil War
