= 43rd Enrolled Missouri Militia =

43rd Enrolled Missouri Militia Infantry Regiment
- State Flag of Missouri
- Active: Between 26 July 1862 and 8 August 1862 - November 9, 1864, and November 25, 1864
- Allegiance: United States; Missouri
- Branch: Union Army
- Type: Militia
- Size: 810

Commanders
- Notable commanders: Colonel Franklin W. Hickox

The 43rd Enrolled Missouri Militia Infantry Regiment, or the 43rd Enrolled Missouri Militia, was a regiment in the Enrolled Missouri Militia during the American Civil War.

== Service ==
The regiment was organized in Moniteau County and commanded by Colonel Franklin W. Hickox, with a strength of 810. It was enrolled between 26 July 1862 and 8 August 1862. The service record shows that it was initially ordered into service and underwent multiple discharges during its tenure. This began between July 26, 1862, and September 28, 1862, with the final discharge occurring between November 9, 1864, and November 25, 1864.

From September 22 to October 26, 1863, the regiment took part in operations against Shelby's Raid

The regiment was finally discharged between November 9, 1864, and November 25, 1864.

== Notable commanders ==
- Colonel Franklin W. Hickox

== See also ==
- Enrolled Missouri Militia Units
