= 3rd Enrolled Missouri Militia =

3rd Enrolled Missouri Militia Infantry Regiment
- State Flag of Missouri
- Active: September 25, 1864 – October 31, 1864
- Allegiance: United States; Missouri
- Branch: Union Army
- Type: Militia
- Size: 921
- Engagements: Price's Missouri Expedition

The 3rd Enrolled Missouri Militia Infantry Regiment was a militia regiment that was called up to repel Price's Missouri Expedition.

== Service ==
The regiment was called into service on September 25, 1864.

The regiment was relieved from active service on October 31, 1864.

== Notable commanders ==
- Colonel N. Schnitter

== See also ==
- Enrolled Missouri Militia units
