= Battery K, 1st Missouri Light Artillery Regiment =

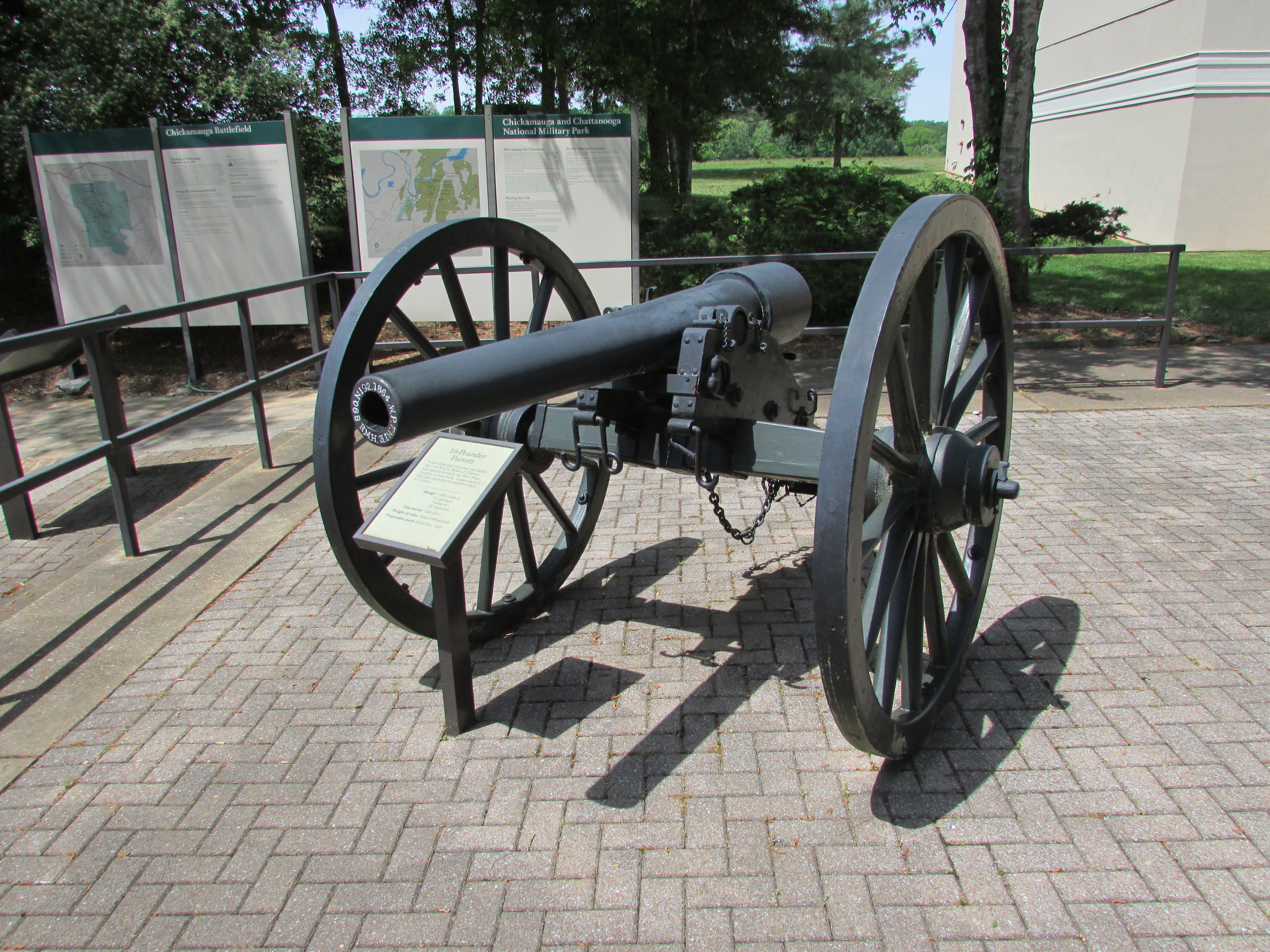
- Battery K was armed with four 10-pounder Parrott rifles. One is shown in the photo above.
- Active: 1 Sept. 1861 – 4 Aug. 1865
- Country: United States
- Allegiance: (United States) Union; Missouri
- Branch: Union Army
- Type: Artillery
- Size: Artillery Battery
- Equipment: 4 x 10-pounder Parrott rifles
- Engagements: American Civil War; Battle of Fort Henry (1862); Battle of Fort Donelson (1862); Battle of Shiloh (1862); Siege of Corinth (1862); Battle of Corinth (1862); Battle of Helena (1863); Battle of Bayou Fourche (1863)

Commanders
- Notable commanders: George H. Stone; Stillman O. Fish

Battery K, 1st Missouri Light Artillery Regiment was an artillery battery unit from Missouri that served in the Union Army during the American Civil War. The 1st Missouri Light Artillery Regiment was formed 1 September 1861. Battery K fought at Fort Henry, Fort Donelson, Shiloh, 1st Corinth, and 2nd Corinth in 1862. The unit was in action at Helena and Bayou Fourche in 1863. Battery K performed garrison and occupation duty at Little Rock, Arkansas in 1863–1865 before being mustered out on 4 August 1865.

== Organization ==
Attached to Dept. of Missouri, to February, 1862. 3rd Brigade, 2nd Division, District of Cairo, Ill., February, 1862, 3rd Brigade, 2nd Division, District of West Tennessee, Army of the Tennessee, to April, 1862. Artillery, 2nd Division, Army Tennessee, to July, 1862. Artillery, District of Corinth, Miss., to November, 1862. Artillery, District of Corinth, 13th Army Corps (Old), Dept. of the Tennessee, to December, 1862. Artillery, District of Corinth, Miss., 17th Army Corps, to January, 1863. Artillery, District of Jackson, Tenn., 16th Army Corps, to March, 1863. Artillery, 1st Division, 16th Army Corps, to July, 1863. Artillery, 13th Division, 16th Army Corps, District of Eastern Arkansas, to August, 1863. Artillery, 3rd Division, Arkansas Expedition, to January, 1864. Artillery, 3rd Division, 7th Army Corps, Dept. of Arkansas, to May, 1864. Artillery, 2nd Division, 7th Army Corps, to February, 1865. Artillery, 1st Division, 7th Army Corps, to August, 1865.

== History ==
1st Missouri Light Artillery Regiment was organized at St. Louis, Mo., from 1st Missouri Infantry, September 1, 1861. Duty in the Dept. of Missouri until February, 1862. Reconnaissance toward Fort Henry, Tenn., January 31-February 2. Capture of Fort Henry February 6. Investment and capture of Fort Donelson, Tenn., February 12–16. Expedition to Clarksville and Nashville, Tenn., February 22-March 6. Moved to Pittsburg Landing, Tenn. Battle of Shiloh, Tenn., April 6–7. Advance on and siege of Corinth, Miss., April 29-May 30. Occupation of Corinth May 30 and pursuit to Booneville May 30-June 6. Duty at Corinth until October. Battle of Corinth October 3–4. Pursuit to Ripley October 5–12. Duty at Corinth until January, 1863, and in the District of Jackson, Tenn., until June, 1863. Ordered to Helena, Ark. Repulse of Holmes' attack on Helena July 4. Steele's Expedition against Little Rock, Ark., August 1-September 10. Bayou Fourche and capture of Little Rock September 10. Garrison duty at Little Rock until August, 1865. Operations against Shelby north of the Arkansas River May 13–31, 1864. Mustered out August 4, 1865.

== See also ==
- List of Missouri Union Civil War units
