= Voerster's Independent Company of Sappers and Miners =

- Active: September 1861 to March 18, 1862
- Country: United States
- Allegiance: United States of America; Union
- Branch: Engineers
- Engagements: Road Construction on Rolla to Springfield military line

Commanders
- First Commander: Captain J. D. Voerster

The Voerster's Independent Company of Sappers and Miners was an independent company of military engineers that served in the Union Army during the American Civil War.

The Company was organized in St. Louis, Missouri under the authority of Major General John C. Frémont. The company was intended to provide engineering and pioneer support to the Army of the West operating at that time in the state of Missouri. While the company was subsequently consolidated with other organizations, it appears to have continued to carry out specialized engineering functions, at least thought the end of 1862 and possibly later.

== Service ==
Attached to Army of the West and Unattached District of Southwest Missouri, Dept. of Missouri. Engaged in road repair and construction between Rolla and Springfield, Missouri.

On March 18, 1862, Special Orders No. 43 of the Adjutant General of Missouri ordered Voerster's Independent Company of Sappers and Miners consolidated with other units to form the 5th Missouri Volunteer Infantry. The company appears to have continues to be considered to be a specialized company of engineering specialists.

On December 3, 1862, the company (commanded by Captain J. E. Hensler), and by then known as Company "I (Sappers and Miners)", 5th Missouri Volunteer Infantry, was reassigned, becoming Company "I", 35th Missouri Volunteer Infantry. The history of the "Company of Sappers and Miners" merges with the 35th Missouri from this point.

At least some of the members of Company "I" were subsequently transferred to the 1st Regiment Missouri Volunteer Engineers.

== Commanders ==
- Captain J. D. Voerster
- Captain John E. Hensler,
- 1st Lt Christian Lochbuler
- 2nd Lt John Krebs

== See also ==
- Missouri Civil War Union units

== Notes and references ==
- Dyer, Frederick H. A Compendium of the War of the Rebellion (Des Moines, IA: Dyer Pub. Co.), 1908.
