= Thomas Curley (Wisconsin general) =

19th century American politician

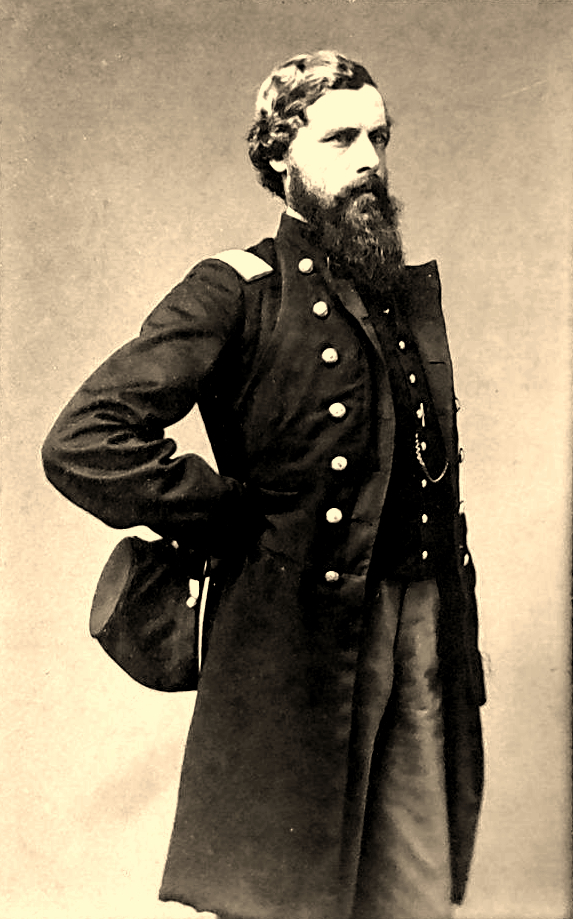
- Curley in his military uniform

Member of the Wisconsin State Assembly from the Crawford district
- In office January 1, 1883 – January 3, 1887
- Preceded by: Atley Peterson
- Succeeded by: Hugh Porter

Personal details
- Born: May 8, 1825 County Roscommon, Ireland, UK
- Died: February 24, 1904 (aged 78) Madison, Wisconsin, U.S.
- Resting place: Saint Gabriel Cemetery, Prairie du Chien, Wisconsin
- Party: Democratic

Military service
- Allegiance: United States; Irish Republican Brotherhood
- Branch/service: United States Volunteers; Union Army
- Years of service: 1861–1865 (USV)
- Rank: Colonel, USV; Brevet Brig. General, USV
- Unit: 7th Reg. Miz. Vol. Infantry; 27th Reg. Miz. Vol. Infantry
- Battles/wars: American Civil War: Vicksburg Campaign; Battle of Jackson; Siege of Vicksburg; Chattanooga campaign; Battle of Lookout Mountain; Battle of Missionary Ridge; Sherman's March to the Sea

Thomas Curley (May 8, 1825 – February 24, 1904) was an Irish American farmer, soldier, and Democratic politician. He was a member of the Wisconsin State Assembly, representing Crawford County in the 1883 and 1885 sessions. During the American Civil War, he served as an officer in the Union Army, rising to the rank of brigadier general.

== Background and military service ==
Curley was born in Tremane, near Athleague in County Roscommon, Ireland, on May 8, 1825, and received a common school education. He immigrated to the United States in 1851, and settled at first in St. Louis, Missouri, where he became an active member and officer of several militia companies. He entered the military service in 1860, as a first lieutenant in the Missouri Volunteer Militia's Southwest Battalion, and served for six months on the frontier of the state. In June 1861, after the outbreak of the Civil War and the Camp Jackson Affair, he enlisted in the United States Army, and was commissioned a major in the 7th Missouri Volunteer Infantry, known as the "Irish Seventh". Curley was promoted in May 1862 to lieutenant colonel, and in July of that year he was sent home to Missouri to recruit, raising in a short time the 27th Missouri Volunteer Infantry, of which he was made colonel. He participated in the Vicksburg Campaign, the capture of Jackson, the campaign of the XV Army Corps from Vicksburg to Chattanooga, and the battles of Lookout Mountain and Missionary Ridge. He was with William Tecumseh Sherman in his march to the sea; fought at Resaca, Dallas, Kennesaw Mountain, Jonesborough, and Lovejoy's Station, and in the capture of Savannah and Fort McAllister. He was in the campaign through South Carolina which captured Charleston and Columbia; was in on the battle of Bentonville, capture of Raleigh, and many minor campaigns.

He was breveted brigadier general on March 17, 1865, for meritorious services during the war, and returned to St. Louis with his regiment.

== Life after Missouri ==
Curley moved to Wisconsin in 1867, first settling in Mount Sterling.

In 1871, he was one of several Irish-American veteran officers who participated in an attack (not officially sanctioned by the Fenian Brotherhood and thus not considered by all a true "Fenian raid") by a combined force of Irish-Americans and Pembina-area Métis on the Hudson's Bay Company trading post at the international border in October 1871. The Americans were captured by a unit of the American army, and released after a hearing in which it was concluded that such an attack, however imprudent, did not violate American law. The Métis were not so lucky.

He moved to the town of Haney, in 1874. He was a town supervisor in 1878, and ran for the Assembly that year, losing with 746 votes to 989 for Republican Atley Peterson, and 710 for Greenbacker S. L. Wannemaker.

Curley was elected to the Assembly in 1882 by five votes, drawing 1042 votes, to 1037 for Republican T. L. Brown, and 264 for old opponent Wannemaker, now running as a Prohibitionist. He served as chairman of the standing committee on the militia, and on the committee on federal relations. He was re-elected in 1884 for the 1885-86 session, with 1,614 votes to 1,585 for Republican Peterson (to whom he had lost in 1878); in that session, Curley remained on the committees on the militia, and moved to the committee on agriculture.

He was not a candidate for reelection in 1886, and was succeeded by Republican Hugh Porter.

== After the Assembly ==
His wife Elizabeth, like himself a native of Ireland, died in 1887. He died February 24, 1904, in Madison, and is buried with Elizabeth in Saint Gabriel Cemetery in Prairie du Chien.

Wisconsin State Assembly
Preceded by Atley Peterson	Member of the Wisconsin State Assembly from the Crawford district January 1, 1883 – January 3, 1887	Succeeded by Hugh Porter
