= 23rd Missouri Infantry Regiment =

- Active: September 1861 to July 18, 1865
- Country: United States
- Allegiance: Union
- Branch: Infantry
- Engagements: Battle of Shiloh; Atlanta campaign Siege of Atlanta; Battle of Jonesborough; Sherman's March to the Sea; Carolinas campaign (4 companies); Battle of Bentonville (4 companies)

The 23rd Missouri Infantry Regiment was an infantry regiment that served in the Union Army during the American Civil War.

== Service ==
The 23rd Missouri Infantry Regiment was organized from recruits across the state of Missouri in September 1861 and mustered in for three years service under the command of Colonel Jacob T. Tindall.

The regiment was attached to the Department of the Missouri to March 1862. St. Louis, Missouri, Department of the Missouri, to April 1862. Unattached, 6th Division, Army of the Tennessee, to April 1862. District of St. Louis, Missouri, Department of the Missouri, to June 1863. District of Rolla, Department of the Missouri, to December 1863. Unattached, District of Nashville, Tennessee, Department of the Cumberland, to January 1864. 2nd Brigade, Rousseau's Division, XII Corps, Department of the Cumberland, to April 1864. Unassigned, 4th Division, XX Corps, Department of the Cumberland, to July 1864. 1st Brigade, 3rd Division, XIV Corps, to July 1865.

The 23rd Missouri Infantry mustered out July 18, 1865.

== Detailed service ==
Moved to Macon City, Mo., October 15, 1861, then to Chillicothe, Mo., November 1. Duty at Chillicothe, Mo., November 1861 to March 1862, and St. Louis, Mo., until April. Moved to Pittsburg Landing, Tenn., April 1–4. Battle of Shiloh, Tenn., April 6. Regiment captured April 6. Duty at St. Louis, Mo., until August 1862. At Macon until November 1862. At Hudson, Mo., until December 1862, and in Central District of Missouri. Company A at Gasconade, Company D at Osage City, Company I at St. Auberts; remainder of the regiment at Prairie City, District of St. Louis, December 1862 to July 1863. Operations against Marmaduke April 14-May 2, 1863. Cape Girardeau April 26. Ordered to Rolla July 5, 1863. Duty in District of Rolla until December 1863. (Company G ordered to Cape Girardeau July 5, 1863.) Operations against Shelby October 7–22. Ordered to Nashville, Tenn., December 1863. Duty at Nashville and McMinnville and guarding Nashville & Chattanooga Railroad until July 1864. White County January 16, 1864. Atlanta Campaign July 10 to September 8. Chattahoochie River July 10–17. Peach Tree Creek July 19–20. Siege of Atlanta July 22-August 25. Flank movement on Jonesboro August 25–30. Battle of Jonesboro August 31-September 1. Operations in northern Georgia and northern Alabama against Forrest and Hood September 29-November 3. March to the sea November 15-December 10. Near Milledgeville November 23. Siege of Savannah December 10–21. Carolinas Campaign January to April 1865. Fayette, N.C., March 11. Battle of Bentonville March 19–21. Occupation of Goldsboro March 24. Advance on Raleigh April 10–14. Occupation of Raleigh April 14. Bennett's House April 26. Surrender of Johnston and his army. March to Washington, D.C., via Richmond, Va., April 29-May 17. Grand Review of the Armies May 24. Moved to Louisville, Ky., June, and duty there until July.

== Casualties ==
The regiment lost a total of 236 men during service; 2 officers and 57 enlisted men killed or mortally wounded, 4 officers and 173 enlisted men died of disease.

== Commanders ==
- Colonel Jacob T. Tindall - killed in action at the Battle of Shiloh

== See also ==
- Missouri Civil War Union units
- Missouri in the Civil War
