= 1st Enrolled Missouri Militia =

1st Regiment Enrolled Militia Infantry Regiment
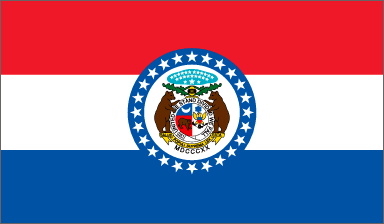
- State Flag of Missouri
- Active: September 25, 1864 - October 31, 1864
- Country: United States
- Allegiance: United States; Missouri
- Type: Militia
- Size: Regiment
- Engagements: Price's Missouri Expedition

The 1st Enrolled Missouri Militia Infantry Regiment was a militia regiment that was raised to repel Price's Missouri Expedition.

== Service ==
The militia regiment was called into service on September 25, 1864. The regiment, alongside a detachment of the 24th Missouri saw action at Mill Creek Bridge on July 24, 1864. On October 31st, the regiment was relieved from active service.

== See also ==
- List of Union units from Missouri in the American Civil War
