= 18th United States Colored Infantry Regiment =

- Active: September 28, 1864, to February 21, 1866
- Country: United States
- Allegiance: United States of America; Union
- Branch: Infantry
- Engagements: Defense of Nashville; Battle of Nashville; Pursuit of Hood; Skirmish at Elrod's Tan Yard

The 18th United States Colored Infantry Regiment was an African-American infantry regiment, raised in the state of Missouri, which served in the Union Army during the American Civil War.

== Service ==
Organized in Missouri at large February 1 to September 28, 1864. (Note: The 62nd, not 63rd, was the first black regiment raised in Missouri. The 62nd, 65th, 67th and 68th were initially mustered in as Missouri Volunteers of African Descent.) Unlike other African-American regiments from the State of Missouri, the regiment was mustered directly into U.S., rather than state service. (Note: The four other African-American infantry regiments raised in Missouri (the 63rd, 65th, 67th, and 68th U.S. Colored Troops) were initially organized as state regiments in Federal service: the 1st, 2nd, 3rd, and 4th Missouri Regiments of Colored Infantry. Later all were later converted to "U.S." regiments in accordance with Department of War policy.)

Attached to District of St. Louis, Mo., Department of Missouri, to December 1864. Unassigned, District of the Etowah, Department of the Cumberland, December 1864. 1st Colored Brigade, District of the Etowa, Dept. of the Cumberland, to January 1865. Unassigned, District of the Etowah, Dept. of the Cumberland, March 1865. 1st Colored Brigade, Dept. of the Cumberland, to July 1865. 2nd Brigade, 4th Division, District of East Tennessee and Department of the Tennessee, to February 1866.

== Detailed Service ==
Duty in District of St. Louis, Mo., and at St. Louis until November 1864. Ordered to Nashville, Tenn., November 7. Moved to Paducah, Kentucky, November 7–11, thence to Nashville, Tenn. Occupation of Nashville during Hood's investment December 1–15. Battles of Nashville December 15–16. Pursuit of Hood to the Tennessee River December 17–28. At Bridgeport, Alabama, guarding railroad until February 1865. Action at Elrod's Tan Yard January 27. (Note: For further details of the action at Elrod's Tan Yard and a map of the skirmish.) At Chattanooga, Tennessee, and in District of East Tennessee until February 1866. Mustered out February 21, 1866.

== Commanders ==
Lieutenant Colonel John J. Sears

== See also ==
- List of Missouri Civil War Units
- List of United States Colored Troops Civil War units
- Missouri in the American Civil War
- 1st Missouri Regiment of Colored Infantry
- 2nd Missouri Regiment of Colored Infantry
- 3rd Missouri Regiment of Colored Infantry
- 4th Missouri Regiment of Colored Infantry
- Lincoln University of Missouri
