= 42nd Missouri Infantry Regiment =

Regiment in the Union Army during the American Civil War

- Active: September 1, 1864 - June 28, 1865
- Allegiance: Union
- Branch: Union Army
- Type: Infantry
- Engagements: American Civil War

Commanders
- Notable commanders: William Forbes

The 42nd Missouri Infantry Regiment was an infantry regiment that served in the Union Army during the American Civil War.

== Service ==
The 42nd Missouri Infantry Regiment was organized at Macon, Missouri in September 1864, attached to the District of Northern Missouri in the Department of Missouri. It was transferred to Tullahoma, Tennessee in the Department of the Cumberland in December, and was assigned as an unattached unit to the 4th Division of XX Corps in February 1865; the regiment would spend the rest of its service there with the Department of the Cumberland. After being assigned to the 2nd Brigade of the Defenses of the Nashville & Chattanooga Railroad in March, the regiment and its brigade became part of the 1st Sub-District of the District of Middle Tennessee in April. During March, the regiment moved to Shelbyville for garrison duty, and Companies H, I, and K were mustered out on 22 March. The remainder of the regiment was moved to Nashville on 23 June and mustered out there on June 28, 1865, having lost six enlisted men killed or mortally wounded and 124 to disease for a total of 134 casualties.

== Detailed Service ==
The organization of this regiment was commenced early in Aug., 1864. By the middle of September it numbered 900 men and was then for some time engaged in the guerrilla warfare in Missouri and in Price's Raid. Toward the latter part of November the command was concentrated at Benton Barracks, St. Louis, where the officers received their commissions and the regiment was mustered in, the last companies being mustered on the 29th. The same day the regiment embarked on transports for Paducah, where it received orders to report to Gen. George Thomas at Nashville, Tenn. Before reaching Nashville it was sent to Fort Donelson, which place was then threatened by the Confederate Gen. Hylan B. Lyon, and remained there until Dec. 30, losing 150 men by small-pox, measles and incidental camp diseases. On the 31st the regiment arrived at Nashville and reported to Gen. Thomas, who sent it to garrison the post at Tullahoma, and there it remained until mustered out. Three companies were mustered out on March 22, and the remainder on June 28, 1865.

== See also ==
- List of Missouri Union Civil War units
