= John A. Haggerty =

American businessman and politician

John A. Haggerty (June 26, 1841 – March 11, 1910) was an American businessman and politician.

Born in Blairstown, New Jersey, Haggerty was educated in the Blairstown schools. During the American Civil War, Haggerty served in the 3rd Wisconsin Volunteer Infantry Regiment. In 1866, Haggerty moved to Mount Sterling, Wisconsin. He was in the mercantile business and served as postmaster of Mount Sterling. He served as treasurer for the town of Utica, Crawford County, Wisconsin. Haggerty also served on the Crawford County Board of Supervisors and was chairman of the county board. He lived in Ferryville, Wisconsin. In 1901, Haggerty served in the Wisconsin State Assembly, where he was on the Dairy and Food Committee. He was a Republican. He died at his home in Ferryville, Wisconsin.
