= 3rd Missouri Colored Infantry Regiment =

3rd Missouri Colored Infantry Regiment 67th U.S. Colored Troops Regiment
- Active: December 1863 to July 12, 1865
- Country: United States
- Allegiance: Union
- Branch: Infantry
- Engagements: American Civil War: Expedition to Bayou Sara

The 3rd Missouri Colored Infantry Regiment was an African-American infantry regiment that served in the Union Army during the American Civil War. It was redesignated as the 67th U.S. Colored Troops Regiment on March 11, 1864.

== Service ==
The 3rd Missouri Colored Infantry Regiment was organized at Benton Barracks, in St. Louis, Missouri, in the winter of 1863–1864. Designation changed to 67th Regiment United States Colored Troops March 11, 1864. Attached to Dept. of Missouri to March 1864. District of Port Hudson, Louisiana, Dept. of the Gulf, to June 1864. Provisional Brigade, District of Morganza, Dept. of the Gulf, to September 1864. 2nd Brigade, 1st Division, United States Colored Troops, District of Morganza, Dept. of the Gulf, to February 1865. 1st Brigade, 1st Division, United States Colored Troops, District of Morganza, Dept. of the Gulf, to May 1865. Northern District of Louisiana, Dept. of the Gulf, to July 1865.

== Detailed Service ==
Moved from Benton Barracks, Missouri, to Port Hudson, Louisiana, arriving March 19, 1864, and duty there till June. Moved to Morganza, Louisiana, and duty there till June 1865. Action at Mt. Pleasant Landing, Louisiana, May 15, 1864 (Detachment). Expedition from Morganza to Bayou Sara September 6–7, 1864. Moved to Port Hudson June 1, 1865. Consolidated with 65th Regiment, United States Colored Troops, July 12, 1865.

== Commanders ==
- Colonel Alonzo J. Edgerton

=== Other soldiers ===
- Spottswood Rice - private in Company A

== See also ==
- List of Missouri Civil War Units
- List of United States Colored Troops Civil War units
- Missouri in the American Civil War
- 1st Missouri Regiment of Colored Infantry
- 2nd Missouri Regiment of Colored Infantry
- 4th Missouri Regiment of Colored Infantry
- 18th U.S. Colored Infantry - Raised "at large" in the State of Missouri
- Lincoln University of Missouri
