= 1st Missouri Colored Infantry Regiment =

1st Missouri Colored Infantry Regiment - 62nd U.S. Colored Troops
- Active: December 14, 1863, to March 31, 1866
- Country: United States
- Allegiance: United States of America; Union
- Branch: Infantry
- Engagements: Battle of Palmito Ranch; Battle of White's Ranch

The 1st Missouri Colored Infantry Regiment was an infantry regiment of the Union Army's United States Colored Troops which served during the American Civil War. It was redesignated as the 62nd Regiment of United States Colored Troops on March 11, 1864.

== Service ==
The 1st Missouri Colored Infantry Regiment was organized at Benton Barracks, in St. Louis, Missouri, December 7–14, 1863. Attached to District of St. Louis, Mo., to January 1864. Designation changed to 62nd Regiment United States Colored Troops March 11, 1864. Ordered to Port Hudson, Louisiana. District of Baton Rouge, La., Dept. of the Gulf, to June 1864. Provisional Brigade, District of Morganza, Dept. of the Gulf, to September 1864. 2nd Brigade, 1st Division, United States Colored Troops, District of Morganza, Dept. of the Gulf, to September 1864. Port Hudson, La., Dept. of the Gulf, to September 1864. Brazos Santiago, Texas, to October, 1864. 1st Brigade, 2nd Division, United States Colored Troops, Dept. of the Gulf, to December 1864. Brazos Santiago, Texas, to June 1865. Dept. of Texas to March 1866.

== Detailed Service ==
Ordered to Baton Rouge, La., March 23, 1864, and duty there till June. Ordered to Morganza, La., and duty there till September. Expedition from Morganza to Bayou Sara September 6–7. Ordered to Brazos Santiago, Texas, September, and duty there till May 1865. Expedition from Brazos Santiago May 11–14. Action at Palmetto Ranch May 12–13, 1865. White's Ranch May 13. Last action of the war. Duty at various points in Texas till March 1866. Ordered to St. Louis via New Orleans, La. Mustered out March 31, 1866.

== Founding of Lincoln University ==
One of the soldiers' most important achievements came at the end of the war. Between duties, and after the termination of hostilities, soldiers of the 62nd and 65th U.S. Colored Troops had been taught to read and write. The troops of these two regiments agreed that they wished to continue their studies as civilians. The soldiers and their officers signed resolutions pledging to work to establish a school "for the special benefit of free blacks". Troops of the 62nd U.S.C.T. were especially energetic in working towards this goal, raising $5,000 to support the establishment of the planned educational institution. This effort eventually lead to the opening of the Lincoln Institute (now Lincoln University) in Jefferson City, Missouri, on September 16, 1866.

== Commanders ==
- Colonel Theodore H. Barrett

== See also ==
- List of Missouri Civil War Units
- List of United States Colored Troops Civil War units
- Missouri in the American Civil War
- 2nd Missouri Regiment of Colored Infantry
- 3rd Missouri Regiment of Colored Infantry
- 4th Missouri Regiment of Colored Infantry
- 18th U.S. Colored Infantry - Raised "at large" in the State of Missouri
- Lincoln University of Missouri
