= 1st Missouri Cavalry Regiment (Union) =

- Provisional Government of Missouri (Pro-Union)
- Active: September 6, 1861 to September 1, 1865
- Country: United States
- Allegiance: Union
- Branch: Cavalry
- Engagements: American Civil War

The 1st Missouri Volunteer Cavalry Regiment was a cavalry regiment with three battalions that served in the Union Army during the American Civil War from 1861 to 1865.

== Background ==
Missouri in the American Civil War was divided, with the southern and central portion of the state pro-Confederacy, and most of the rest pro-Union. By the end of the Civil War, Missouri had supplied nearly 110,000 troops to the Union and at least 40,000 troops for the Confederate Army with additional bands of pro–Confederate guerrillas. There were battles and skirmishes in all areas of the state, from Iowa and the Illinois border in the northeast to the edge of the state in the southeast and southwest on the Arkansas border. Counting minor engagements, actions and skirmishes, Missouri saw over 1,200 distinct fights. Only Virginia and Tennessee exceeded Missouri in the number of clashes within the state's boundaries.

By the War's end, some 447 Missouri Regiments like the 1st Missouri Cavalry Regiment fought for the Union.

== Service ==
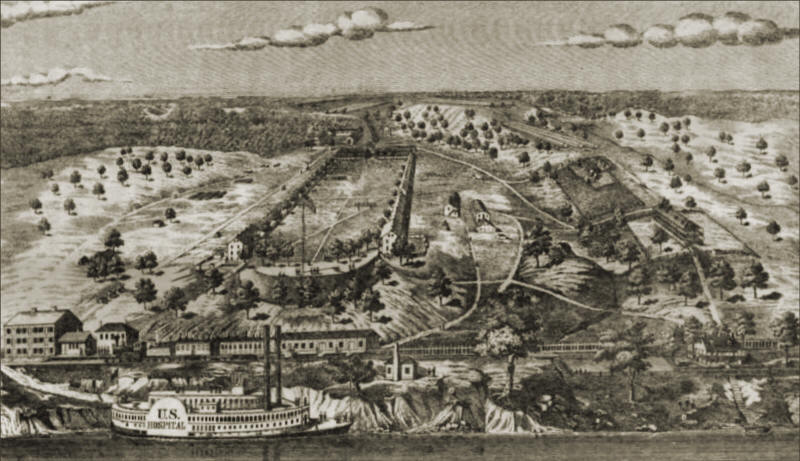
Jefferson Barracks at the time of the Civil War.

The 1st Missouri Cavalry Regiment was organized at Jefferson Barracks located on the Mississippi River at Lemay, Missouri, south of St. Louis. The Regiment served and fought from September 6, 1861 until mustering out on September 1, 1865.

The Regiment moved to Benton Barracks September 12, 1861 thence to Jefferson City, Missouri ON September 21 (5 Companies) for training. Other Companies moved to Jefferson City on October 4 and later joined the Regiment at Tipton, Missouri, October 19. It was later organized into 3 battalions.

The Regiment served with the Expedition to Lexington October 5–16 (Companies "C" and "L"). Capture of Lexington October 16 (Companies "C" and "L"). Warrensburg, Missouri October 18. General Fremont's advance on Springfield, Missouri, October 20–26, 1861.

1st Battalion (Companies "A," "C," "D" and "E") moved to Sedalia, Missouri, as escort to General David Hunter, November; thence to Fort Leavenworth in Kansas, and duty there until May, 1862. Attached to Dept. of Kansas November, 1861, to May, 1862. District of Southwest Missouri, Dept. of Missouri, to October, 1862. 2nd Brigade, 2nd Division, Army of the Frontier, Dept. of Missouri, to February, 1863. 2nd Brigade, 3rd Division, Army of the Frontier, to June, 1863. 1st Brigade, 1st Cavalry Division, District of Southeast Missouri, Dept. of Missouri, to August, 1863. Reserve Brigade, 1st Cavalry Division, Arkansas Expedition, to December, 1863. 1st Brigade, 1st Division Cavalry, Army of Arkansas, to January, 1864. 1st Brigade, 1st Cavalry Division, 7th Army Corps, Dept. of Arkansas, to May, 1864. 3rd Brigade, 1st Division, 7th Army Corps, to September, 1864. (Regiment consolidated to 7 Cos. September 10, 1864.) 2nd Brigade, Cavalry Division, 7th Army Corps, to March, 1865. Separate Brigade, 7th Army Corps, to September, 1865.

2nd Battalion (Companies. "B," "H," "I", and "L.") Moved to Otterville, Mo., November, 1861, and duty there until February, 1862. Expedition to Milford December 15–19. Shawnee Mound, Milford, Blackwater River, December 19. Roan's Tan Yard, Silver Creek, January 8, 1862. Joined 3rd Battalion at Lebanon February 9. Attached to 3rd Brigade, Army of Southwest Missouri, Dept. of Missouri, to February, 1862. 2nd Brigade, 3rd Division, Army of Southwest Missouri, to April, 1862. Cassville, Mo., District of Southwest Missouri, to October, 1862. (Detached from 3rd Battalion at Cassville, Mo., April 7.) Unattached, 2nd Division, Army of the Frontier, to January, 1863; then same as 1st Battalion. Advance on Springfield, Mo., February 13–16. Pursuit of Price to Fayetteville, Ark., February 13–16. Skirmish with Price's Rear Guard February 14–15. Bentonville February 17. Sugar Creek February 18. Reconnaissance to Berryville March 3–7. Battles of Pea Ridge March 7–8. Leetown March 7. Elkhorn Tavern March 8. Operations against Stan Wattee March 19–23. At Cross Timbers until April 6. Moved to Cassville April 6–7. Santa Fe Road April 14. Neosho April 26. Near Newtonia August 8. Union Mills August 20. Occupation of Newtonia October 4, Battle of Prairie Grove, Ark., December 7. Expedition over Boston Mountains December 27–29. Dripping Springs and capture of Van Buren December 28. (See 1st Battalion.)

3rd Battalion (Companies "F," "G," "K" and "M."). Moved to Rolla, Mo., November, 1861. Expedition against Sam Freeman December --. Stein's Creek, LaClede County, January 1, 1862. Scouting on the Gasconade until January 15, 1862. Attached to 3rd Brigade, Army of Southwest Missouri, Dept. of Missouri, to April, 1862. 2nd Division, Army of Southwest Missouri, to July, 1862. District of Eastern Arkansas, Dept. of Missouri, to December, 1862. 1st Brigade, 3rd Cavalry Division, District of Eastern Arkansas, to January, 1863, Helena, Ark., District of Eastern Arkansas, 13th Army Corps, Dept. of Tennessee, to January, 1863. District Of Memphis, Tenn., 16th Army Corps, to March, 1863. 4th Brigade, District of Memphis, 5th Division, 16th Army Corps, to June, 1863. Dept. of Missouri to December, 1863. New Madrid, Mo., to September, 1864.

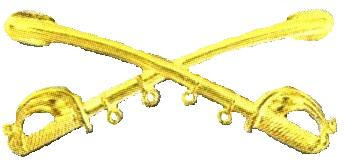
United States Cavalry branch insignia

== Detailed service ==
The Regiment served, conducted operations and fought in mostly the Trans-Mississippi Theater of the American Civil War in the following areas as cited in "A Compendium of the War of the Rebellion, V.III" by Frederick H. Dyer, 1908, pages 1301-1302.

=== 1st Battalion ===
- 1st Battalion commenced Operations about Atchison, Kansas, 20–24 January 1862 by Company E.
- Pink Hill 31 March by Companies "C" and "D".
- Regimental move to Independence, Missouri in May, 1862, and operating against guerrillas until September 1862.
- Scout to Little Blue River 15–17 May by a Detachment.
- Scout around Independence on 16 May by a Detachment.
- Minor Military action near Sedalia, Missouri on 5 June involving Companies "A," "C" and "E".
- Operations in Johnson County, Missouri 28–29 June.
- Expedition toward Blackwater and Chapel Hill, Missouri 6–9 July.
- Expedition in Cass County, Missouri 9–11 July.
- Action at Lotspeach Farm, near Wadesburg Cass County, Missouri, 9 July.
- Action at Sear's House and Big Creek Bluffs, near Pleasant Hill, Missouri on 8 August with Companies "A," "C" and "D".
- Regiment joins General Francis J. Herron and becomes part of "Herron's Division" in September (1862).
- Regiment at Rolla, Missouri until June 1863.
- Regiment moved to Pilot Knob, Missouri and joins General John Davidson's Cavalry Division.
- Expedition against Little Rock, Arkansas, 1 July 1 to 10 September 1863.
- Engagement at Pocahontas, Missouri 24 August.
- Engagement at Shallow Ford and Bayou Meto, Arkansas County, Arkansas on 30 August.
- Action near Shallow Ford on 2 September.

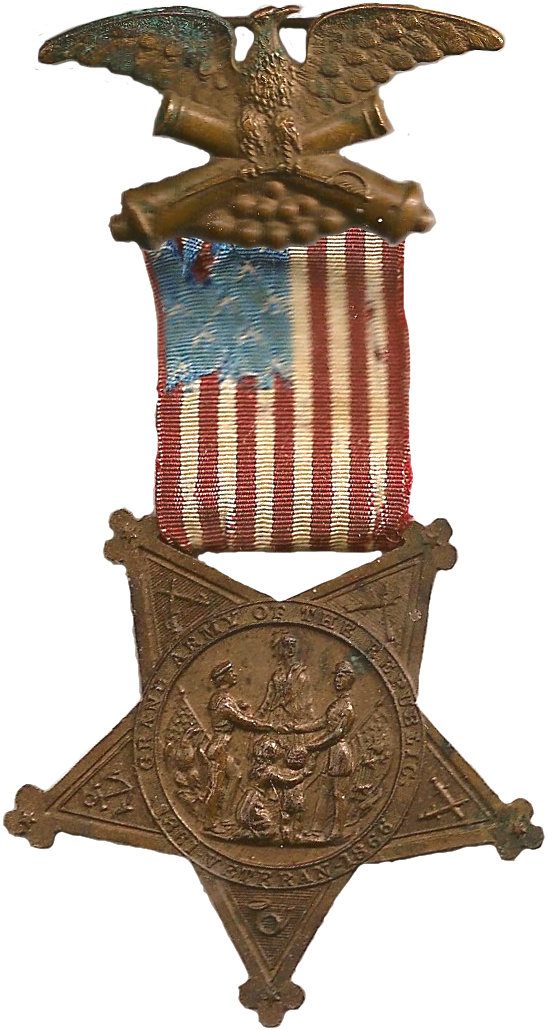
The Grand Army of the Republic badge. Authorized by the U.S. Congress to be worn on the uniform by Union Army veterans.

- Engagement at Bayou Fourche and capture of Little Rock, Arkansas 10 September.
- Expedition from Benton to Mt. Ida Arkansas 10–18 November
- Engagement at Caddo Gap, Arkansas 11 November.
- Action near Benton 1 December.
- Reconnaissance from Little Rock 5–13 December. (1863)
- Regiment at Little Rock until March 1864.
- Regiment at Carter's Creek Polk County, Arkansas in January 1864.
- Regiment with General Frederick Steele's Expedition to Camden, Arkansas 23 March to 3 May 1864.
- Engagement at Rockport, Arkansas 25 March.
- Action at Arkadelphia, Arkansas 29 March.
- Action at Spoonville, Clark County, Arkansas 2 April.
- Action at Little Missouri River on 6 April.
- Engagement at Prairie D'Ann 9–12 April.
- Action at Camden on 15 April.
- Action at Jenkins' Ferry, Saline River on 30 April.
- Operations against Confederate General Shelby north of Arkansas River 18–31 May 1864.
- Action at Osceola, Arkansas on 2 August.
- Action at Benton, Arkansas on 18 August.
- Action near Pine Bluff, Arkansas 18 August.
- Scout to Benton 6–7 September.
- Reconnaissance to Princeton, Arkansas 19 to 23 October.
- Expedition to Saline River 17 to 18 November.
- Expedition to Mt. Elba in Cleveland County, Arkansas from 22 January 22 to 4 February 1865.
- Regiment at Little Rock, Arkansas until mustering out on 1 September 1865.

=== 2nd & 3rd Battalions ===
- The 2nd & 3rd Battalions conducted operations with the Curtis' Campaign in Southwest Missouri between January 15 and February 16, 1862.
- Occupation of Lebanon January 26, 1862.
- Reconnaissance beyond Bolivar February 6–9.
- Bolivar February 8.
- Advance on Springfield, Mo., February 10–13.
- Pursuit of CSA Major General Sterling Price to Fayetteville, Arkansas, February 13–16.
- Skirmish with Price's Rear Guard February 14–15.
- Bentonville February 17.
- Sugar Creek February 18.
- Reconnaissance to Berryville March 3–7.

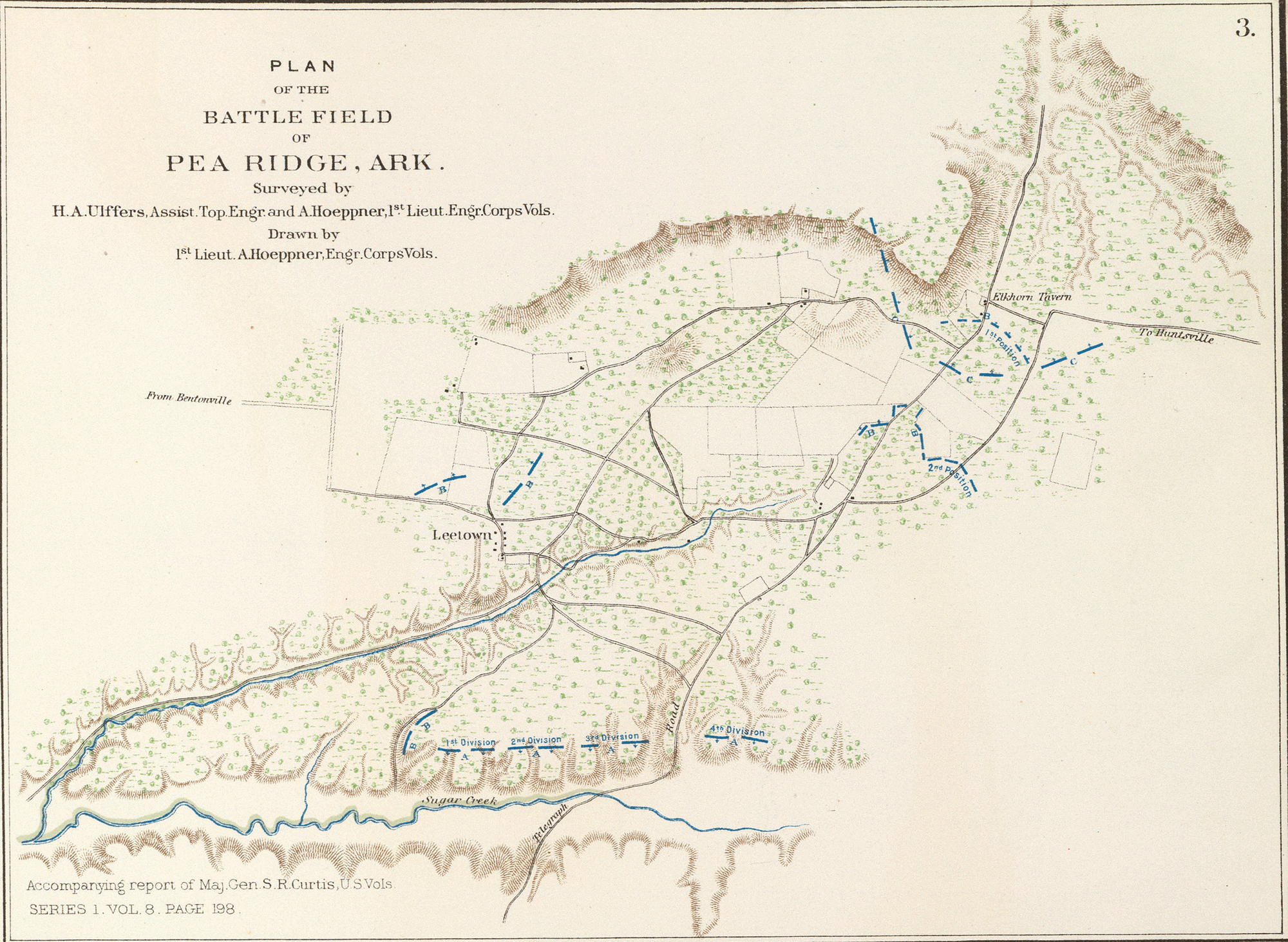
Plan of the Battlefield of Pea Ridge. The Battle of Pea Ridge (also known as the Battle of Elkhorn Tavern) fought between March 6–8, 1862, at Pea Ridge, Arkansas.

- Battles of Pea Ridge March 6–9.
- Leetown March 7.
- Elkhorn Tavern March 8.
- Operations against Stan Wattee March 1962.
- At Cross Timbers until April 6.
- Advance to Forsyth, thence to Batesville April 7-May 5. (Co. "F" detached as escort to General Jeff C. Davis May 10, 1862, and moved to Army of the Tennessee.) ***
- March to Helena, Arkansas, May 25-July 14.
- Big Indian Creek, White County, May 23.
- Searcy, White County, May 27.
- Taberville August 11.
- Lagrange September 6.
- Expedition to Lawrenceville and St. Charles September 11–13.
- Expedition from Helena to Lagrange September 26.
- Near Helena October 11.
- Expedition from Helena to Moro November 5–8, 1862.
- At Helena, Arkansas, until January 29, 1863.
- Moved to Memphis, Tennessee, and duty there until June.
- Carter's Creek Pike April 27.
- Expedition to Hernando May 23–24 and May 26 (Detachments).
- Scouts toward Hernando May 27–28 (Detachment).
- Operations in Northwest Mississippi June 15–25.
- Coldwater, near Hernando, June 19 (Detachment).
- Hernando June 20.
- Moved to St. Louis, Missouri, June 30-July 3; thence to Cape Girardeau escorting train July 20–27.
- March to Bloomfield and return to Cape Girardeau August 1–6.
- Expedition to Pocahontas August 17–27. Pocahontas August 24.
- At Cape Girardeau and Pilot Knob until October 23, and at Bloomfield until December 14, 1863.
- Moved to New Madrid, Missouri, and duty there until September 1864.
- In swamps of Little River April 6, 1864.
- Scout to Gainesville, Arkansas, May 10–25.
- Expedition to Carruthersville July 5–10.
- Operations in Southeast Missouri and Northeast Arkansas July 18-August 6.

*** Company "F" served detached as escort to General Jeff C. Davis, commanding 4th Division, Army of Mississippi, to September 1862; then with Headquarters, 9th Division, 3rd Corps, Army of Ohio, to November 1862. 1st Division, Right Wing 14th Army Corps, Army of the Cumberland, to January 1863. 1st Division, 20th Army Corps, Army of the Cumberland, to October, 1863. At Headquarters, Dept. of Missouri, to August 1864. Siege of Corinth, Miss., April 29-May 30, 1862. Campaign against Bragg in Kentucky October 1862. Stone River Campaign December 1862-January 1863. Weem's Springs August 19, 1863.

== Roster ==
A roster of those who served with the 1st Missouri Volunteer Cavalry Regiment is available through the Missouri Digital Heritage. Some 2,922 names, with company designation and a link to a soldier record of service card provides more detail, are on the roster. Some names are duplicated and some may have been off this list. The link is here. Note: Care must be exercised not to confuse the Regiment with a Confederate States of America (CSA) unit of same name.

== Casualties ==
The Regiment lost 2 Officers and 51 Enlisted men killed or mortally wounded due to combat. A further 2 Officers and 179 Enlisted men lost their lives due to disease. Total 234.

== See also ==
- Missouri Civil War Union units
- Missouri in the Civil War
