= 4th Missouri Infantry Regiment (Union, 3 months) =

4th Missouri Infantry Regiment "Schwarze Jäger"
- Active: April 1861 to July 30, 1861
- Country: United States
- Allegiance: Union
- Branch: Infantry
- Nickname(s): Schwarze Jäger, Black Rifles
- Engagements: Camp Jackson Affair; Expedition to Fulton, Missouri

The 4th Missouri Infantry Regiment evolved from one of several unofficial pro-Unionist militia units formed semi-secretly in St. Louis in the early months of 1861 by Congressman Francis Preston Blair Jr. and other Unionist activists. The organization that would become the Fourth Missouri was largely composed of ethnic Germans, who were generally opposed to slavery and strongly supportive of the Unionist cause. Although initially without any official standing, beginning on April 22, 1861, four militia regiments Blair helped organize were sworn into Federal service at the St. Louis Arsenal by Captain John Schofield acting on the authority of President Lincoln. Secessionists and opponents of Unionist military organizing in Missouri in 1861 commonly referred to this unit as the "Black Guard" and "the blaggards".

The 4th Missouri Volunteer Infantry evolved out of a pre-existing German hunting society "Die Schwarzen Jäger". Upon entry into Federal service, the members of the new Fourth Missouri elected Nicolaus Schuettner colonel of the regiment. The new Missouri Volunteer regiments, subsequently elected (then) Captain Nathaniel Lyon as the brigadier general of the new brigade of Missouri volunteers. President Lincoln would later confirm Lyon's promotion from Captain to Brigadier general.

== Military service ==
On May 10, 1861, the 1st Missouri under Colonel Blair participated in the arrest of the Missouri Volunteer Militia drilling at Camp Jackson at Lindell Grove on the western border of St. Louis City. As the Missouri militiamen were being marched under guard back to the Arsenal near the riverfront, angry crowds confronted the Federal forces, and the confused situation soon devolved into rioting and gunfire. Over 27 people were killed and the Camp Jackson Affair helped to polarize the state and send Missouri down the road to its own internal civil war.

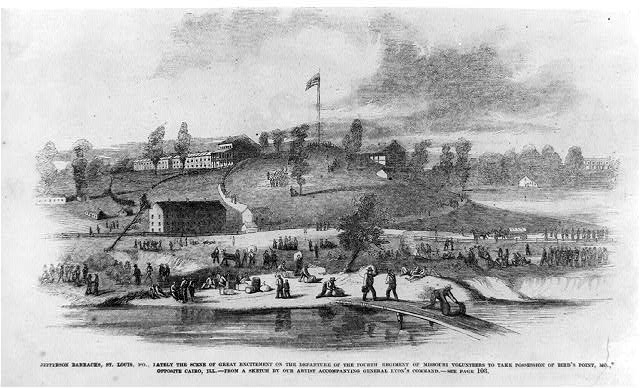
Jefferson Barracks, St. Louis, Mo., the scene of great excitement on the departure of the Fourth Regiment of Missouri Volunteers to take possession of Bird's Point, Mo., opposite Cairo, Ill.

On May 21, 1861, Western Department commander Brigadier General William S. Harney ordered the Fourth Missouri to Bird's Point, Missouri, to fortify that strategic point on the Mississippi River. After that, the regiment moved to Cairo, Illinois, directly across the Mississippi River from Bird's Point, and the site of Fort Defiance, which guarded the junction of the Mississippi and Ohio Rivers.

The regiment subsequently returned to St. Louis and carried out an expedition to Fulton, Missouri, while two of its companies carried out guard duty along Pacific Railroad.

The regiment was mustered out on July 30, 1861. While many of the members of the regiment subsequently enlisted in 3-Year regiments, the original 4th Missouri was not continued as a 3-Year regiment. It does not share lineage with the later 4th Missouri Infantry Regiment created by the consolidation of the Gasconade Battalion and 3rd Regiment United States Reserve Corps in January 1862.
