= 4th Missouri Colored Infantry Regiment =

4th Missouri Colored Infantry Regiment 68th U.S. Colored Troops Regiment
- Active: December 1863 to February 5, 1866
- Country: United States
- Allegiance: United States of America; Union
- Branch: Infantry
- Engagements: Battle of Tupelo; Battle of Old Town Creek; Siege of Fort Blakeley; Assault on Fort Blakeley; Occupation of Mobile

The 4th Missouri Colored Infantry Regiment was an African-American infantry regiment that served in the Union Army during the American Civil War. Redesignated as the 68th U.S. Colored Troops Regiment on March 11, 1864.

== Service ==
The 4th Missouri Colored Infantry Regiment was organized at Benton Barracks, in St. Louis, Missouri, in the winter of 1863-1864. The regiment's designation was changed to the 68th United States Colored Troops Regiment on March 11, 1864. Attached to District of Memphis, Tennessee, 16th Corps, Dept. of the Tennessee, to June 1864. 1st Colored Brigade, Memphis, Tenn., District of West Tennessee, to December 1864. Fort Pickering, Defenses of Memphis, Tenn., District of West Tennessee, to February 1865. 3rd Brigade, 1st Division, United States Colored Troops, Military Division West Mississippi, to May 1865. 1st Brigade, 1st Division, United States Colored Troops, District of West Florida, to June 1865. Dept. of Texas to February 1866.

== Detailed Service ==
At St. Louis, Mo., till April 27, 1864. Ordered to Memphis, Tenn., and duty in the Defenses of that city till February 1865. Smith's Expedition to Tupelo, Miss., July 5–21, 1864. Camargo's Cross Roads, near Harrisburg, July 13. Tupelo July 14–15. Old Town Creek July 15. At Fort Pickering, Defenses of Memphis, Tenn., till February 1865. Ordered to New Orleans, La., thence to Barrancas, Florida. March from Pensacola, Fla., to Blakeley, Ala., March 20-April 1. Siege of Fort Blakeley Fort April 1–9. Assault and capture of Fort Blakeley April 9. Occupation of Mobile April 12. March to Montgomery April 13–25. Duty there and at Mobile till June. Moved to New Orleans, La., thence to Texas. Duty on the Rio Grande and at various points in Texas till February 1866. Mustered out February 5, 1866.

== Commanders ==
- Colonel Joseph Blackburn Jones
- Lieutenant Colonel Daniel Densmore

== See also ==
- List of Missouri Civil War Units
- List of United States Colored Troops Civil War units
- Missouri in the American Civil War
- 1st Missouri Regiment of Colored Infantry
- 2nd Missouri Regiment of Colored Infantry
- 3rd Missouri Regiment of Colored Infantry
- 18th U.S. Colored Infantry - Raised "at large" in the State of Missouri
- Lincoln University of Missouri
