= 3rd Missouri US Reserve Corps Infantry Regiment =

- Active: May 8, 1861, to January 1862
- Country: United States
- Allegiance: Union
- Branch: Infantry
- Nickname(s): Turner Zouaves (Turner-Zuaven)
- Engagements: Camp Jackson Affair; Expedition to SW Missouri; Skirmish at Fulton, Missouri

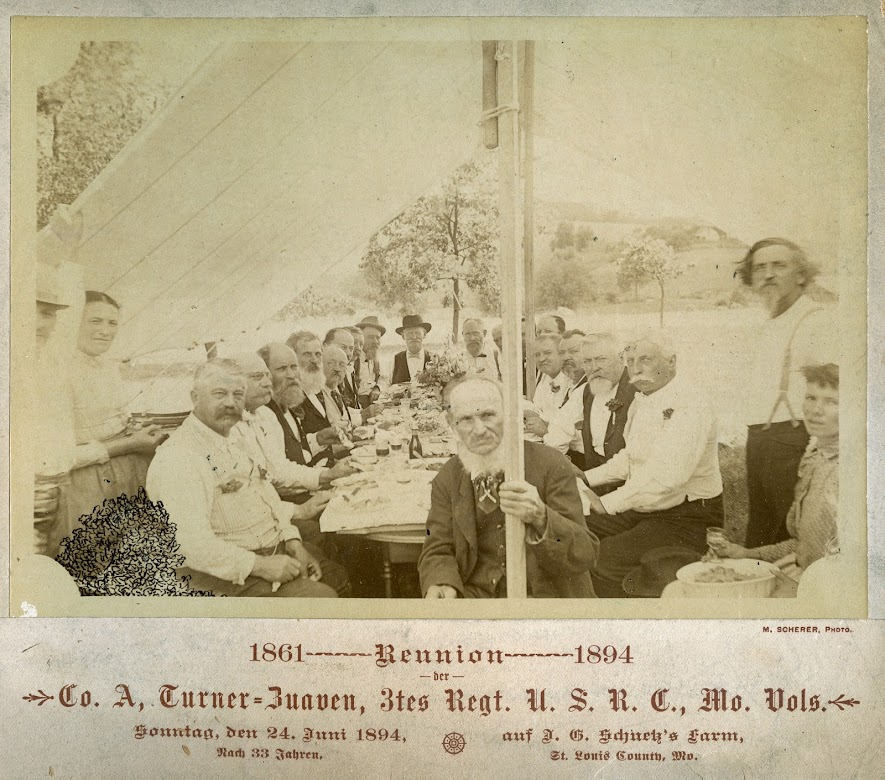
Company A, 3rd United States Reserve Corps (U.S.R.C.) Missouri Infantry Reunion, 1894

The 3rd Missouri US Reserve Corps Infantry Regiment evolved from one of several unofficial pro-Unionist militia units formed semi-secretly in St. Louis in the early months of 1861 by Congressman Francis Preston Blair Jr. and other Unionist activists. The organization that would become the Third U.S.R.C was largely composed of ethnic Germans, who were generally opposed to slavery and strongly supportive of the Unionist cause. 20 percent of the men of the regiment were "native" U.S. citizens. Although initially without any official standing, beginning on April 22, 1861, the Unionist regiments Blair helped organize were sworn into Federal service at the St. Louis Arsenal by Captain John Schofield acting on the authority of President Lincoln.

The first four regiments were considered to be the regiments of Missouri Volunteers called for under President Lincoln's April 15, 1861, call for 75,000 volunteers. So many St. Louis Unionists mustered to volunteer, that after consultation with General-in-Chief Winfield Scott, and Secretary of War Simon Cameron, President Lincoln directed Captain Nathaniel Lyon to "enroll in the military service of the United States the loyal citizens of Saint Louis and vicinity, not exceeding with those heretofore enlisted, ten thousand in number, for the purpose of maintaining the authority of the United States; [and] for the protection of the peaceable inhabitants of Missouri."

These additional regiments, in excess of the original Presidential call were designated "United States Reserve Corps" units, and were intended for local service.

The 3rd Missouri US Reserve Corps Infantry Regiment was mustered into service on May 8, 1861, under Colonel John McNeil. The new Missouri Volunteer regiments subsequently elected (then) Captain Nathaniel Lyon as the brigadier general of the new brigade of Missouri volunteers. President Lincoln would later confirm Lyon's promotion from captain to brigadier general.

== Military service ==
On May 10, 1861, the Third U.S.R.C under Colonel McNeil participated in the arrest of the Missouri Volunteer Militia drilling at Camp Jackson at Lindell Grove on the western border of St. Louis City, who were suspected of being involved in a Confederate plot to seize the federal arsenal in St. Louis. As the Missouri militiamen were being march under guard back to the arsenal near the riverfront, angry crowds confronted the Federal forces and the confused situation soon devolved into rioting and gunfire. Over 27 people were killed and the Camp Jackson Affair helped to polarize the state and send Missouri down the road to its own internal civil war.

The 3rd U.S.R.C. served as part of the St. Louis garrison until July 1, 1861, when three of its companies joined Brigadier General Lyon's Southwest Expedition. On July 16, six additional companies marched on Callaway County, Missouri, where after a skirmish with members of the secessionist Missouri State Guard, they occupied Fulton.

The regiment returned to St. Louis, where in September part of the unit's manpower was mustered out of service at the expiration of their enlistment. The regiment was reorganized under the command of Colonel Charles A. Fritz, who had been the regiment's lieutenant colonel, with a mixture of those who chose to reenlist and new recruits.

In January 1862, the 3rd U.S.R.C Infantry was consolidated with the Gasconade Battalion to form the 4th Missouri Volunteer Infantry

Adolphus Busch served as a Corporal in the regiment from May to August, 1861.

== See also ==
- List of Missouri Union Civil War units
