= 1st Missouri US Reserve Corps Infantry Regiment =

- Active: May 7, 1861, to September 12, 1861
- Country: United States
- Allegiance: Union
- Branch: Infantry
- Engagements: American Civil War: Camp Jackson Affair; Reinforcement of Bird's Point; Expedition to Cuba, Missouri

The 1st Missouri US Reserve Corps Infantry Regiment was a volunteer unit of the Union Army during the American Civil War. It evolved from one of several unofficial pro-Unionist militia units formed semi-secretly in St. Louis in the early months of 1861 by Congressman Francis Preston Blair Jr. and other Unionist activists. The organization that would become the First U.S.R.C was largely composed of ethnic Germans, who were generally opposed to slavery and strongly supportive of the Unionist cause. Although initially without any official standing, beginning on April 22, 1861, the Unionist regiments Blair helped organize were sworn into Federal service at the St. Louis Arsenal by then-Captain John Schofield acting on the authority of President Lincoln.

The first four regiments were considered to be the regiments of Missouri Volunteers called for under President Lincoln's April 15, 1861, call for 75,000 volunteers. So many St. Louis Unionists mustered to volunteer, that after consultation with General-in-Chief Winfield Scott, and Secretary of War Simon Cameron, President Lincoln directed Captain Nathaniel Lyon to "enroll in the military service of the United States the loyal citizens of Saint Louis and vicinity, not exceeding with those heretofore enlisted, ten thousand in number, for the purpose of maintaining the authority of the United States; [and] for the protection of the peaceable inhabitants of Missouri."

These additional regiments, in excess of the original Presidential call were designated "United States Reserve Corps" units, and were intended for local service.

The 1st Missouri US Reserve Corps Infantry Regiment was mustered into service on May 7, 1861, under Colonel Henry Almstead. Composed of men from St. Louis' First Ward, the regiment was unusually large, with 1,200 men in 12 companies. The new Missouri Volunteer regiments, subsequently elected (then) Captain Nathaniel Lyon as the brigadier general of the new brigade of Missouri volunteers. President Lincoln would later confirm Lyon's promotion from captain to brigadier general.

== Military service ==
On May 10, 1861, the 1st Missouri US Reserve Corps Infantry Regiment under Colonel Almstead participated in the arrest of the Missouri Volunteer Militia drilling at Camp Jackson at Lindell Grove on the western border of St. Louis City. As the Missouri militiamen were being march under guard back to the Arsenal near the riverfront, angry crowds confronted the Federal forces and the confused situation soon devolved into rioting and gunfire. Over 27 people were killed and the Camp Jackson Affair helped to polarize the state and send Missouri down the road to its own internal civil war.

On May 18, the regiment received an organic cavalry company, also raised from the First Ward "which did valuable scouting service".

The 1st Missouri US Reserve Corps Infantry carried out Provost duties in St. Louis, until June 20, when the regiment conducted an expedition to Jefferson City (June 20–24).

On duty in St. Louis from June 25-July 29.

On July 29–30, Cos "B", "C", "D", "E", "G", "H", "K", "M" and Cavalry Co "A" marched to reinforce the strategic outpost at Bird's Point, Missouri, directly across from the Federal stronghold at Cairo, Illinois. This detachment remained on duty there until August 13, when it returned to St. Louis.

Meanwhile, a separate detachment composed of Cos "A", "F", and "L" had departed St. Louis, marching to Rolla, Missouri, and then to Cuba, Missouri, arriving there on August 10. The three company detachment remained there until August 13.

The regiment's term of service expired on August 20 and the men were mustered out. Members of the regiment who wished to continue serving were reorganized as the 1st United States Reserve Corps Infantry (Three Years Service), under Colonel Robert J. Rombaur, who had been the regiment's original lieutenant colonel.

== Casualties ==
Regiment lost during service 1 Officer and 3 Enlisted men killed and mortally wounded and 4 Officers and 25 Enlisted men by disease. Total 33.

== See also ==
- List of Missouri Union Civil War units
