= Ferryville, Wisconsin =

- Village
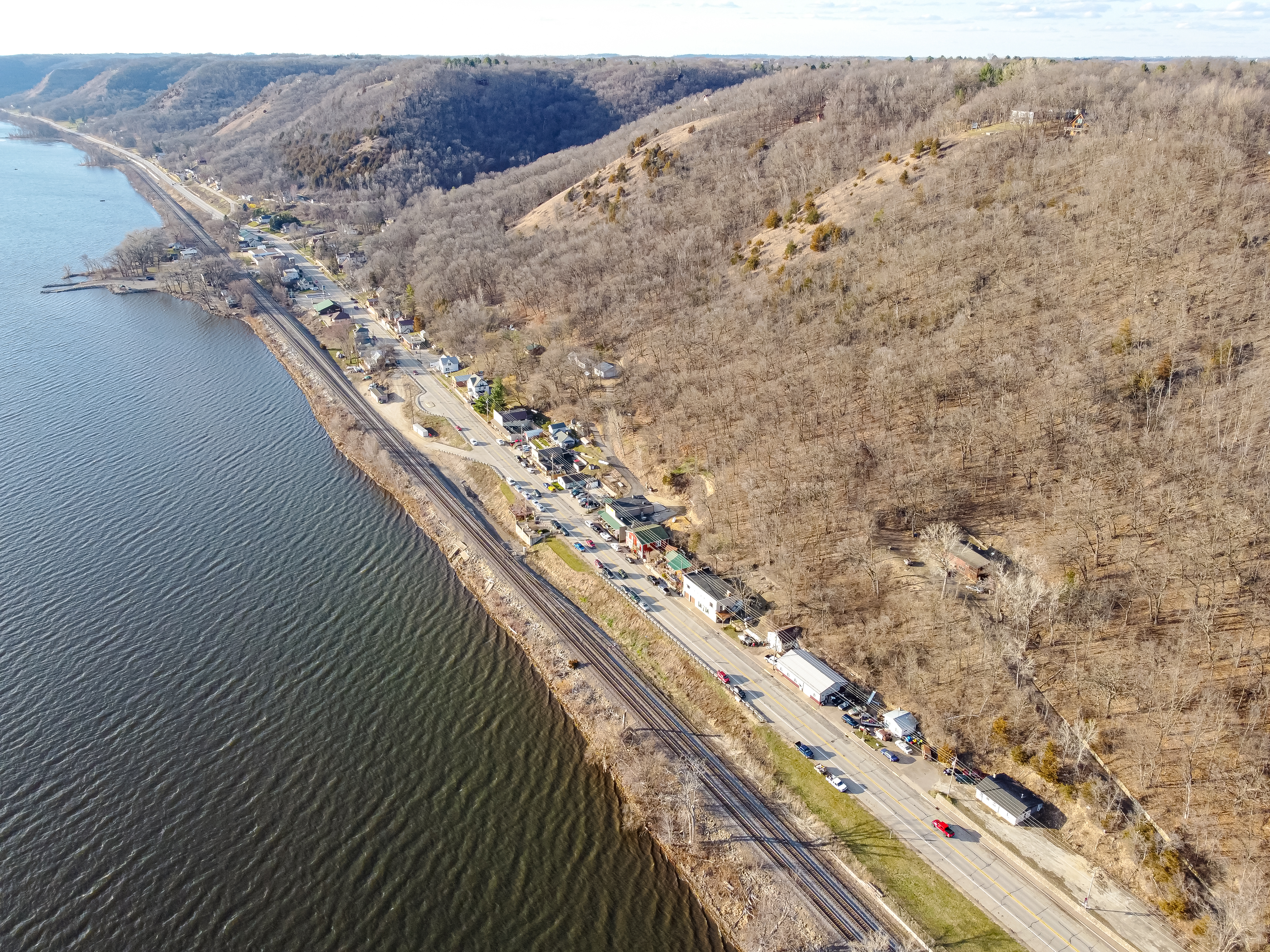
- Between the Driftless Area bluffs and the Upper Mississippi

- Location of Ferryville in Crawford County, Wisconsin.
- Coordinates: 43°20′30″N 91°5′2″W
- Country: United States
- State: Wisconsin
- County: Crawford

Area
  - Total: 1.99 sq mi (5.15 km^{2})
  - Land: 1.97 sq mi (5.10 km^{2})
  - Water: 0.019 sq mi (0.05 km^{2})
- Elevation: 646 ft (197 m)

Population (2020)
  - Total: 191
  - Density: 97.0/sq mi (37.5/km^{2})
- Time zone: UTC-6 (Central (CST))
  - Summer (DST): UTC-5 (CDT)
- Area code: 608
- FIPS code: 55-25725
- GNIS feature ID: 1564924
- Website: vi.ferryville.wi.gov

Ferryville is a village in Crawford County, Wisconsin, United States. The population was 191 at the 2020 census. It is located on Wisconsin Highway 35 along the Great River Road.

== Geography ==
Ferryville is located at 43°20′30″N 91°5′2″W (43.341550, -91.083882).

According to the United States Census Bureau, the village has a total area of 1.99 square miles (5.15 km^{2}), of which 1.97 square miles (5.10 km^{2}) is land and 0.02 square miles (0.05 km^{2}) is water.

== Demographics ==
Historical population
Census	Pop.	Note	%±
1920	203		—
1930	266		31.0%
1940	306		15.0%
1950	216		−29.4%
1960	194		−10.2%
1970	183		−5.7%
1980	227		24.0%
1990	154		−32.2%
2000	174		13.0%
2010	176		1.1%
2020	191		8.5%
U.S. Decennial Census

=== 2010 census ===
As of the census of 2010, there were 176 people, 94 households, and 59 families living in the village. The population density was 89.3 inhabitants per square mile (34.5/km^{2}). There were 165 housing units at an average density of 83.8 per square mile (32.4/km^{2}). The racial makeup of the village was 98.3% White, 0.6% from other races, and 1.1% from two or more races. Hispanic or Latino people of any race were 2.3% of the population.

There were 94 households, of which 16.0% had children under the age of 18 living with them, 48.9% were married couples living together, 12.8% had a female householder with no husband present, 1.1% had a male householder with no wife present, and 37.2% were non-families. 33.0% of all households were made up of individuals, and 16% had someone living alone who was 65 years of age or older. The average household size was 1.87 and the average family size was 2.32.

The median age in the village was 60.5 years. 13.6% of residents were under the age of 18; 3.3% were between the ages of 18 and 24; 7.9% were from 25 to 44; 38.1% were from 45 to 64; and 36.9% were 65 years of age or older. The gender makeup of the village was 47.2% male and 52.8% female.

=== 2000 census ===
As of the census of 2000, there were 174 people, 93 households, and 55 families living in the village. The population density was 70.5 people per square mile (27.2/km^{2}). There were 149 housing units at an average density of 60.4 per square mile (23.3/km^{2}). The racial makeup of the village was 98.85% White, and 1.15% from two or more races.

There were 93 households, out of which 15.1% had children under the age of 18 living with them, 53.8% were married couples living together, 4.3% had a female householder with no husband present, and 39.8% were non-families. 39.8% of all households were made up of individuals, and 23.7% had someone living alone who was 65 years of age or older. The average household size was 1.87 and the average family size was 2.45.

In the village, the population was spread out, with 12.6% under the age of 18, 4.6% from 18 to 24, 17.2% from 25 to 44, 43.7% from 45 to 64, and 21.8% who were 65 years of age or older. The median age was 54 years. For every 100 females, there were 104.7 males. For every 100 females age 18 and over, there were 102.7 males.

The median income for a household in the village was $33,958, and the median income for a family was $45,833. Males had a median income of $28,125 versus $20,357 for females. The per capita income for the village was $20,602. About 3.4% of families and 4.5% of the population were below the poverty line, including none of those under the age of eighteen and 11.9% of those 65 or over.

== Education ==
The De Soto Area Schools serves Ferryville.

== Transportation ==
Bus service towards La Crosse and Prairie du Chien is provided three times daily per direction by Scenic Mississippi Regional Transit. Ferryville is on the former Burlington Route line between Chicago and Minneapolis.

== Notable people ==
- John A. Haggerty, Wisconsin legislator and businessman; lived in Ferryville
- Patrick Lucey, Governor of Wisconsin; justice of the peace in Ferryville

== Images ==
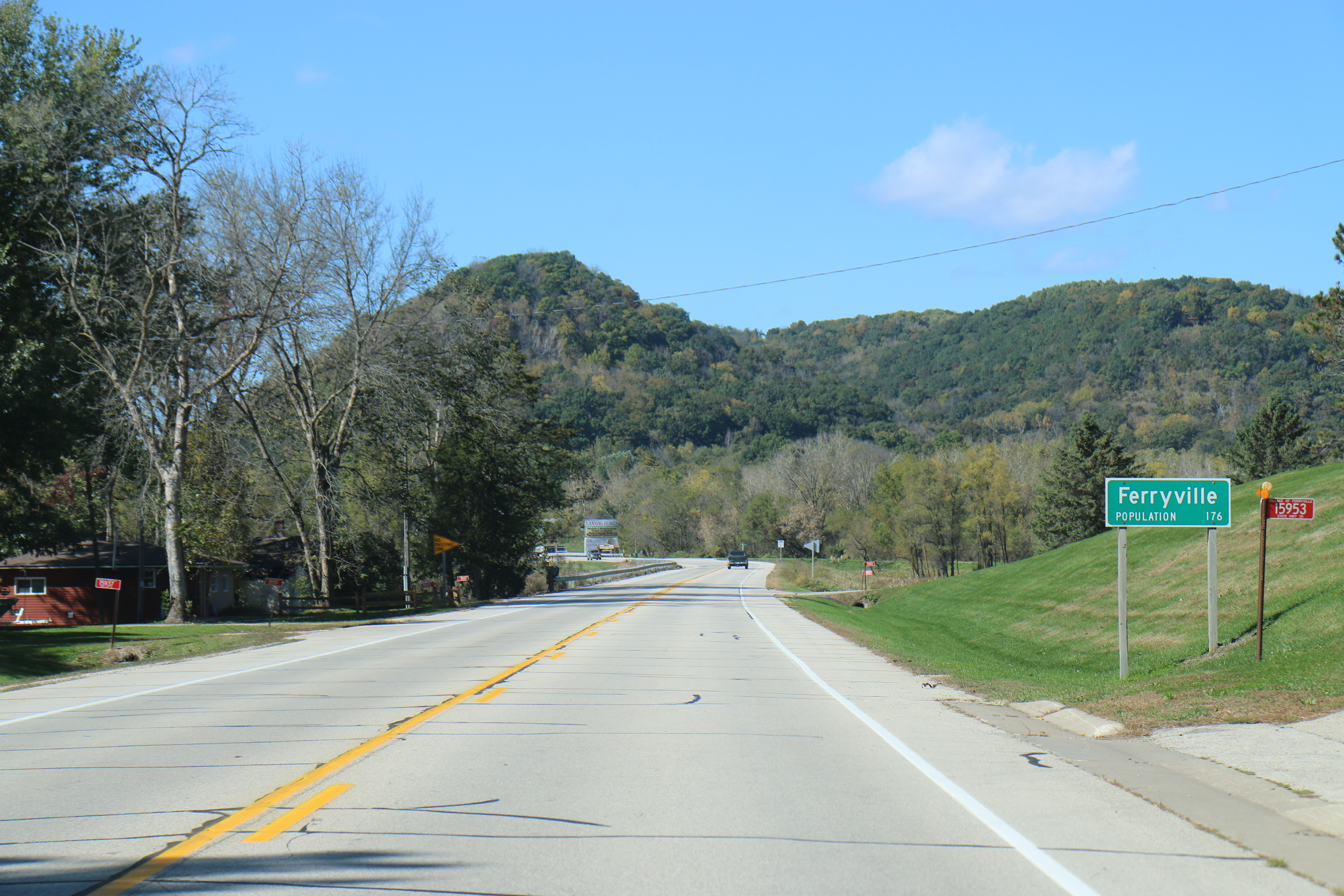
Population sign

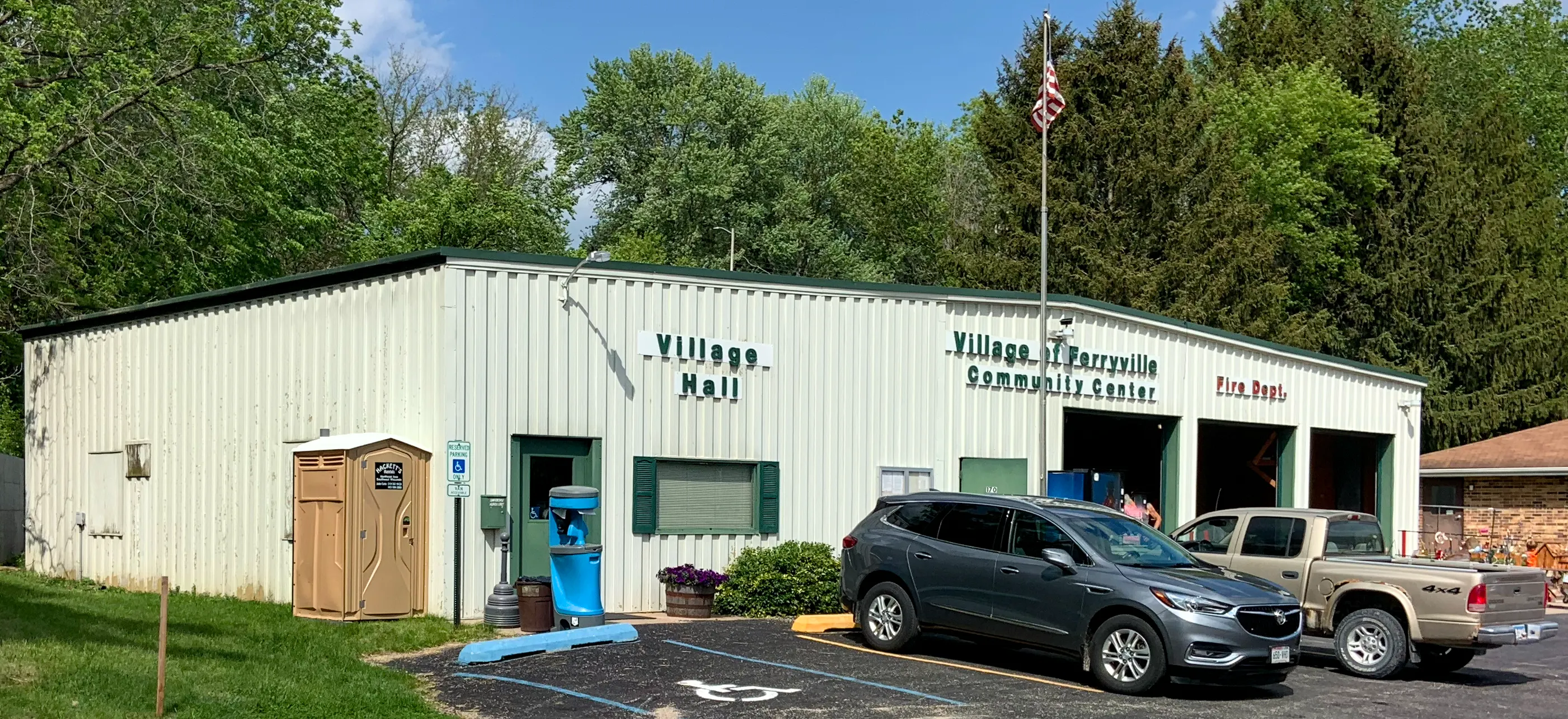
Village Hall

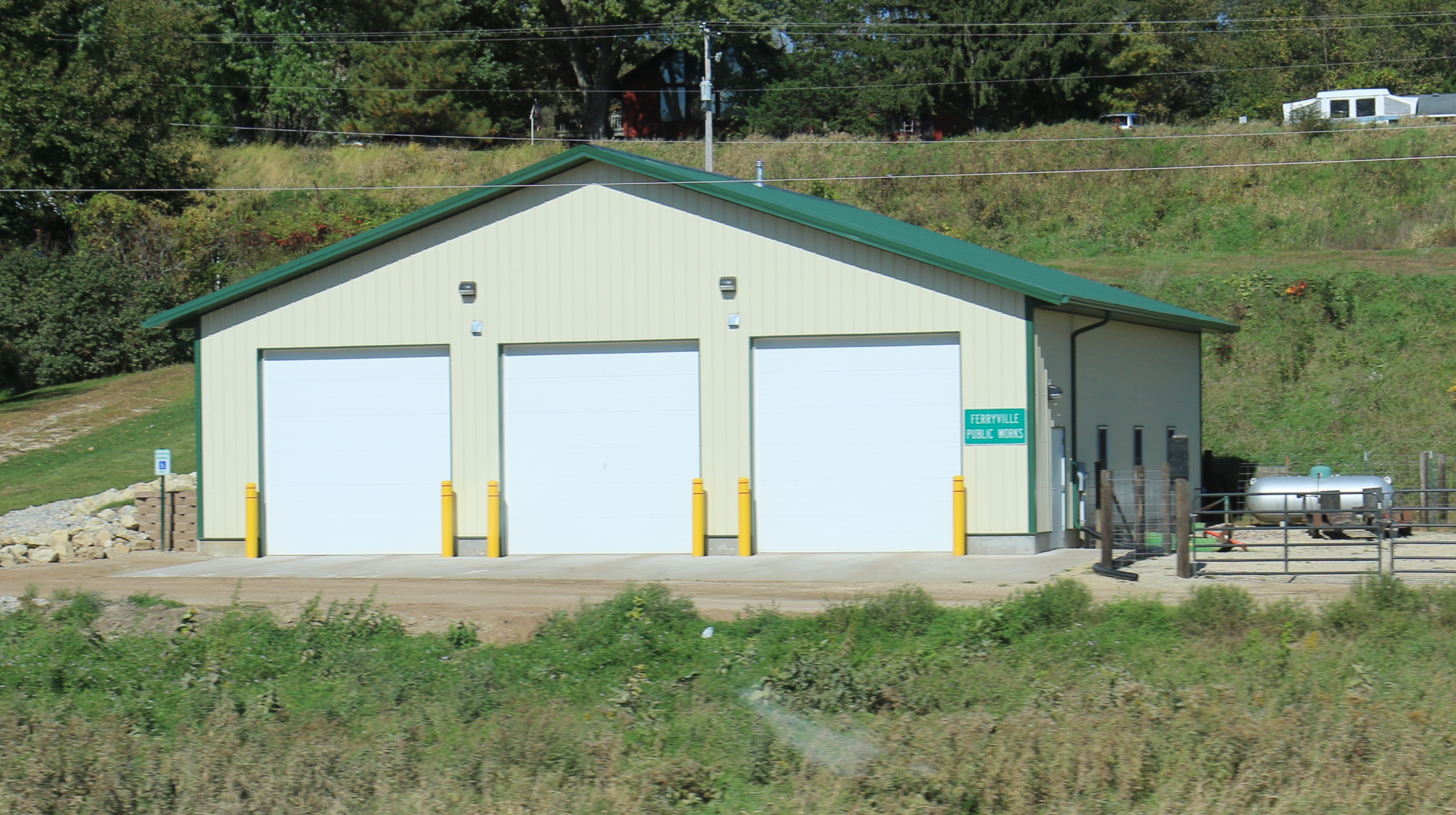
Public Works building
