= 2nd Missouri Colored Infantry Regiment =

2nd Missouri Colored Infantry Regiment 65th U.S. Colored Troops Regiment
- Active: December 14, 1863, to March 31, 1866
- Country: United States
- Allegiance: United States of America; Union
- Branch: Infantry

The 2nd Missouri Colored Infantry Regiment was an African-American infantry regiment that served in the Union Army during the American Civil War. Redesignated as the 65th U.S. Colored Troops Regiment on March 11, 1864.

== Service ==
It was attached to:

- the Department of the Missouri to June 1864
- Provisional Brigade, District of Morganza, Louisiana, Department of the Gulf, to September 1864
- 2nd Brigade, 1st Division, United States Colored Troops, District of Morganza, Department of the Gulf, to February 1865
- 1st Brigade, 1st Division, United States Colored Troops, District of Morganza, Louisiana, Department of the Gulf, to May 1865, on garrison duty at Morganza
- Northern District of Louisiana and Department of the Gulf to January 1867; it was ordered to Port Hudson, Louisiana, for garrison duty there and at Baton Rouge and in the Northern District of Louisiana

It mustered out on January 8, 1867.

== Founding of Lincoln University ==
One of the soldiers' most important achievements came at the end of the war. Between duties, and after the termination of hostilities, soldiers of the 62nd and 65th U.S. Colored Troops had been learning to read and write. The troops of the two regiments agreed that they wished to continue their studies as civilians. The soldiers and their officers signed resolutions pledging to work to establish a school "for the special benefit of free blacks". Troops of the 65th U.S.C.T. were energetic in working towards this goal, raising $1,300 to support the establishment of the planned educational institution. This effort eventually led to the opening of the Lincoln Institute (now Lincoln University) in Jefferson City, Missouri, on September 16, 1866. and http://adamarenson.com/the-great-heart-of-the-republic/errata/

== Total strength and casualties ==
Regiment lost during service 6 Officers and 49 Enlisted men by disease.

The last surviving member of the regiment, and the last surviving black veteran of the Civil War, was the former drummer boy, Private Joseph Clovese. He died in Detroit on July 13, 1951. "Joseph Clovese was the last black member of the Grand Army of the Republic. He had been born a slave, ran away, becoming a drummer boy for Company C, 65th US Colored Infantry. After the war, he spent 20 years trying to locate his mother. He cared for her until she died at age 90. He lived until he was 105."

== See also ==
- List of Missouri Civil War Units
- List of United States Colored Troops Civil War units
- Missouri in the American Civil War
- 1st Missouri Regiment of Colored Infantry
- 3rd Missouri Regiment of Colored Infantry
- 4th Missouri Regiment of Colored Infantry
- 18th U.S. Colored Infantry - Raised "at large" in the State of Missouri
- Lincoln University of Missouri
