= 27th Missouri Infantry Regiment =

- Active: September 2, 1862 to June 13, 1865
- Country: United States
- Allegiance: Union
- Branch: Infantry
- Engagements: Siege of Vicksburg, May 19 & May 22 assaults Chattanooga campaign Battle of Lookout Mountain; Battle of Missionary Ridge; Atlanta campaign Battle of Resaca; Battle of Dallas; Battle of New Hope Church; Battle of Allatoona; Battle of Kennesaw Mountain; Battle of Atlanta; Siege of Atlanta; Battle of Jonesborough; Battle of Lovejoy's Station; Sherman's March to the Sea; Carolinas campaign Battle of Bentonville

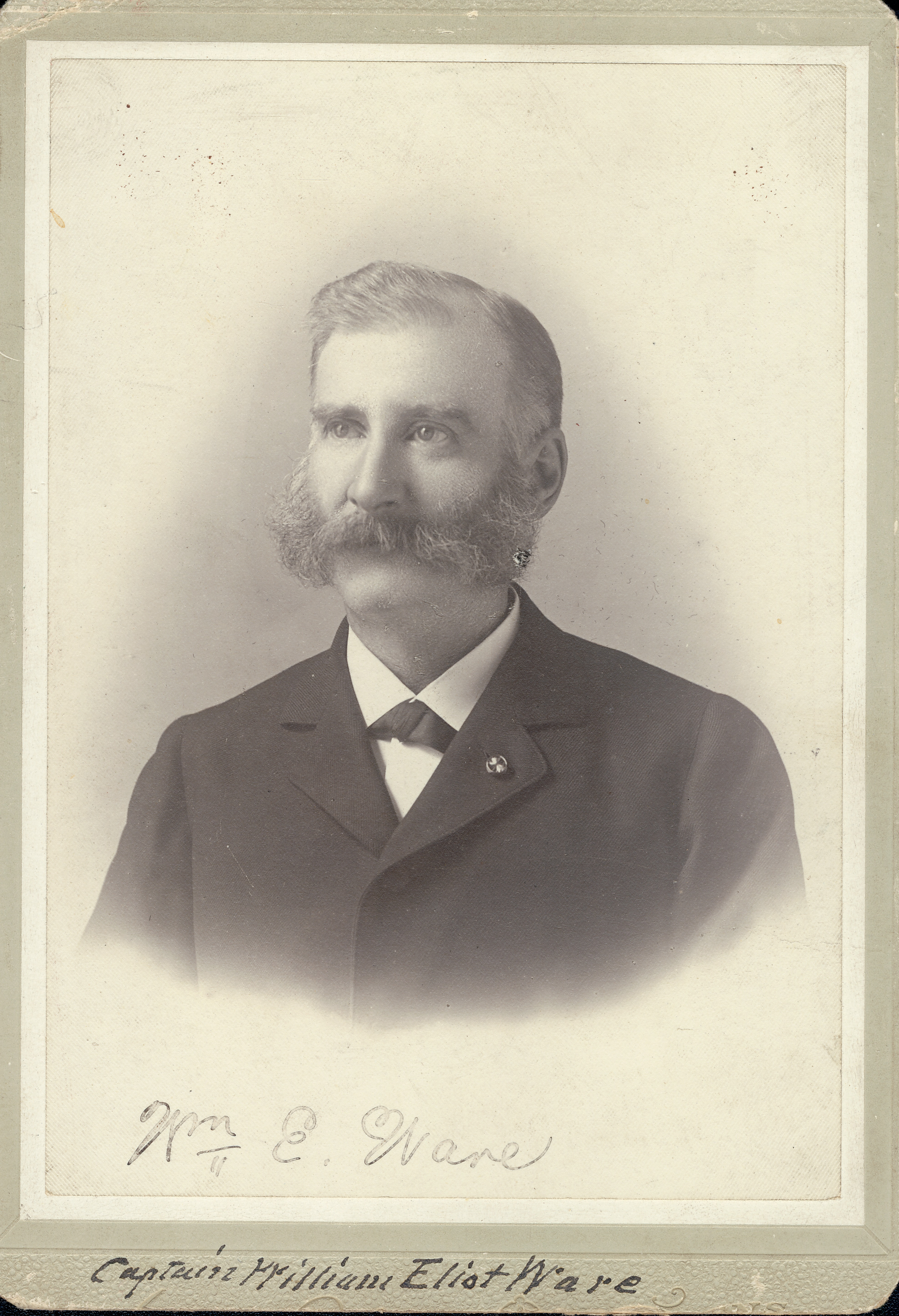
Capt. William E. Ware, 27th Missouri Infantry

The 27th Missouri Infantry Regiment was an infantry regiment that served in the Union Army during the American Civil War.

== Service ==
The 27th Missouri Infantry Regiment was organized at St. Louis, Missouri, September 2, 1862 through January 3, 1863 and mustered in for three years service under the command of Colonel Thomas Curley.

The regiment was attached to District of Rolla, Department of Missouri, to March 1863. 1st Brigade, 1st Division, XV Corps, Army of the Tennessee, to June 1865.

The regiment mustered out June 13, 1865. Because their enlistments had not expired, Companies F, G, and I were transferred to the consolidated battalion of the 31st Missouri Infantry/32nd Missouri Infantry.

== Detailed service ==
On duty at Chillicothe, Mo., and as provost guard at St. Louis during organization of the regiment. Ordered to Rolla, Mo., January 10, 1863. Duty at Rolla, Mo., until March 1, 1863. Ordered to join the Army of the Tennessee before Vicksburg, Miss., arriving there March 20. At Milliken's Bend, La, until April. Expedition to Greenville. Black Bayou and Deer Creek April 2–14. Deer Creek April 8 and 12. Demonstration on Haines and Drumgould's Bluffs April 29-May 2. Moved to join the army in rear of Vicksburg, Miss., via Richmond and Grand Gulf May 2–14. Jackson, Miss., May 14. Siege of Vicksburg, Miss., May 18-July 4. Assaults on Vicksburg May 19 and 22. Advance on Jackson, Miss., July 4–10. Siege of Jackson July 10–17. At Big Black until September 27. Moved to Memphis, then marched to Chattanooga, Tenn., September 27-November 21. Operations on Memphis & Charleston Railroad in Alabama October 20–29. Cherokee Station October 21 and 29. Cane Creek October 26. Tuscumbia October 26–27. Chattanooga-Ringgold Campaign November 23–27. Lookout Mountain November 23–24. Missionary Ridge November 25. Ringgold Gap, Taylor's Ridge, November 27. March to the relief of Knoxville, Tenn., November 28-December 8. Garrison duty at Woodville and Scottsboro, Ala., until May 1864. Atlanta Campaign May 1 to September 8. Demonstration on Resaca May 8–13. Battle of Resaca May 13–15. Advance on Dallas May 18–25. Battles about Dallas, New Hope Church, and Allatoona Hills May 25-June 5. Operations about Marietta and against Kennesaw Mountain June 10-July 2. Brush Mountain June 15–17. Assault on Kennesaw June 27. Nickajack Creek July 2–5. Chattahoochie River July 6–17. Battle of Atlanta July 22. Siege of Atlanta July 22-August 25. Ezra Chapel, Hood's 2nd Sortie, July 28. Movement on Jonesboro August 25–30. Battle of Jonesboro August 31-September 1. Lovejoy's Station September 2–6. Operations against Hood in northern Georgia and northern Alabama September 29-November 3. Ship's Gap, Taylor's Ridge, October 16. March to the sea November 15-December 10. Clinton November 22. Statesboro December 4. Ogeechee River December 7–9. Siege of Savannah December 10–21. Fort McAllister December 13. Carolinas Campaign January to April 1865. Reconnaissance to Salkehatchie River, S.C., January 25. Hickory Hill, S.C., February 1. Salkehatchie Swamps February 2–5. South Edisto River February 9. North Edisto River February 11–12. Columbia February 15–17. Battle of Bentonville, N.C., March 20–21. Occupation of Goldsboro. March 24. Advance on Raleigh April 10–14. Occupation of Raleigh April 14. Bennett's House April 26. Surrender of Johnston and his army. March to Washington, D.C., via Richmond, Va., April 29-May 20. Grand Review of the Armies May 24. Moved to Louisville, Ky., June.

== Casualties ==
The regiment lost a total of 176 men during service; 2 officers and 35 enlisted men killed or mortally wounded, 139 enlisted men died of disease.

== Commanders ==
- Colonel Thomas Curley

== See also ==
- Missouri Civil War Union units
- Missouri in the Civil War
