= 4th Missouri Infantry Regiment (Union, 3 years) =

- Active: January 1862 to February 1, 1863
- Country: United States
- Allegiance: Union
- Branch: Infantry
- Engagements: Local operations, Southwest Missouri

The 4th Missouri Infantry Regiment was an infantry regiment that served in the Union Army during the American Civil War.

== Service ==
The 4th Missouri Infantry Regiment was organized at St. Louis, Missouri and mustered for three years in January 1862. It was established though the consolidation of the 3rd United States Reserve Corps Infantry Regiment, which was largely composed of German immigrants, and the Gasconade Battalion.

On duty at the District of Southwest Missouri and St. Louis.

== Detailed service ==
On duty at Pacific, Missouri and St. Louis.

The 4th Missouri Infantry was mustered out of service on February 1, 1863.

== See also ==
- Missouri Civil War Union units
- Missouri in the Civil War
