= 1st Missouri Infantry Regiment (Union) =

- Active: May 1861 – 31 Aug. 1861
- Country: United States
- Allegiance: (United States) Union; Missouri
- Branch: Union Army
- Type: Infantry
- Size: Regiment
- Engagements: Camp Jackson Affair; Battle of Boonville; Battle of Dug Springs; Battle of Wilson's Creek

Commanders
- Notable commanders: Francis Preston Blair Jr.

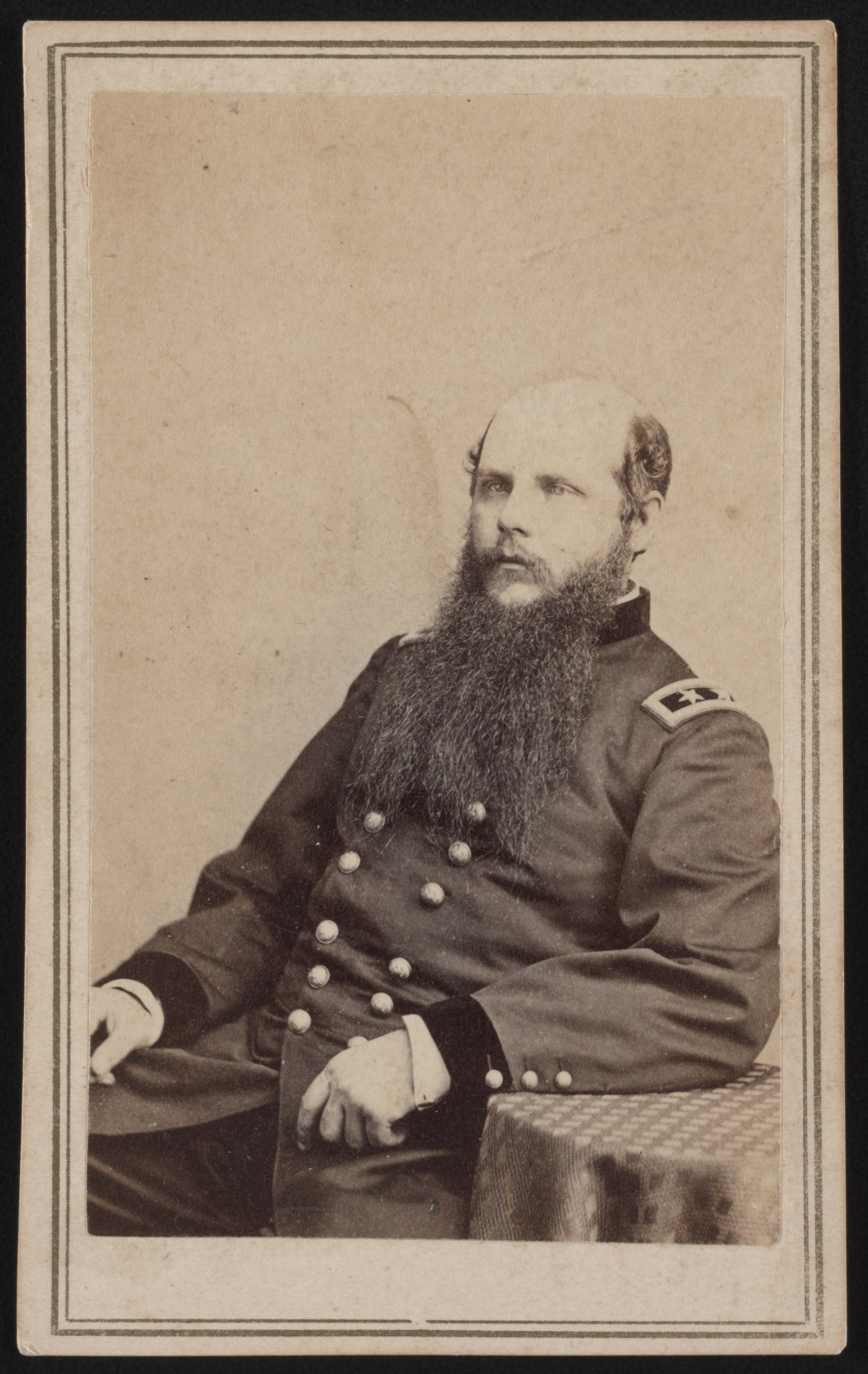
Major General John McAllister Schofield of 1st Missouri Infantry Regiment. From the Liljenquist Family Collection of Civil War Photographs, Prints and Photographs Division, Library of Congress

The 1st Missouri Infantry Regiment evolved from one of several unofficial pro-Unionist Home Guards militia formed in St. Louis in the early months of 1861 by Congressman Francis Preston Blair Jr. and other Unionist activists. The militia that would become the First Missouri was largely composed of ethnic Germans, although Companies K and I had significant numbers of native born American citizens and Irish-Americans. Although initially without any official standing, beginning on April 22, 1861, the four "underground" militia regiments Blair helped organize were sworn into Federal service at the St. Louis Arsenal by Captain John Schofield acting on the authority of President Lincoln.

The 1st Missouri Volunteer Infantry elected Congressman Blair colonel of the regiment. The new Missouri Volunteer regiments, subsequently elected (then) Captain Nathaniel Lyon as the brigadier general of the new brigade of Missouri volunteers. President Lincoln would later confirm Lyon's promotion from captain to brigadier general. The unit was converted to the 1st Missouri Light Artillery Regiment at the beginning of September 1861.

== Military service ==
On 10 May 1861, the 1st Missouri under Colonel Blair participated in the arrest of the Missouri Volunteer Militia drilling at Camp Jackson at Lindell Grove on the western border of St. Louis City. As the Missouri militiamen were being march under guard back to the Arsenal near the riverfront, angry crowds confronted the Federal forces and the confused situation soon devolved into rioting and gunfire. Over 27 people were killed and the Camp Jackson Affair helped to polarize the state and send Missouri down the road to its own internal civil war.

After the collapse of a truce negotiated by Federal Brigadier General William S. Harney and Missouri State Guard commander Sterling Price, the 1st Missouri, along with other Federal forces were ordered by Lyon to move on the Missouri state capitol, at Jefferson City. When the Federal forces arrived on 15 June, the pro-secessionist Governor, Claiborne Fox Jackson had already abandoned the city and Brigadier General Lyon's forces captured the city without resistance. Lyon then pursued Jackson and the State Guard to nearby Boonville where the 1st Missouri Volunteers helped defeat the newly organized Missouri State Guard on 17 June in the short, one-sided Battle of Boonville. While the Battle of Boonville was small by later war standards, it had major strategic consequences, driving the pro-secessionist forces into the southern part of the state and securing the Missouri River valley and communications across the state for the Federal government.

The 1st Missouri continued to campaign with Lyon, marching southwest to Springfield, eventually confronting a united Confederate and Missouri State Guard force near Springfield. The resulting Battle of Wilson's Creek fought ten miles south of the city on 10 August 1861, was a bloody affair, and the second costliest in American history up to that time. The 1st Missouri, now under Lieutenant Colonel George Lippitt Andrews, fought with Lyon's detachment of the Federal force on Bloody Hill. Isolated and outnumbered after a second Federal element under Colonel Franz Sigel was routed, the Federals on Bloody hill fought the Confederate forces to a stalemate. The battle ended only after General Lyon was killed leading the 1st Iowa Infantry against the Confederate right. As the senior U.S. Army regular officer present, command devolved to Major Samuel D. Sturgis. Concerned about his force's ammunition supply, Sturgis decided to withdraw towards Springfield.

The 1st Missouri withdrew to Springfield and then to Rolla. A significant portion of the units members reenlisted as three-year volunteers, retaining the designation as the 1st Missouri Infantry. The regiment was then converted into an artillery unit by order of Major General John C. Frémont, Commander of the Department of the West on 1 September 1861. The resulting 1st Missouri Light Artillery would see action in most of the campaigns in the Western Theater.

== Casualties ==
Union Army: 1st Missouri Infantry Regiment Casualties
Action	Date	Officers Killed	Enlisted Killed	Officers Wounded	Enlisted Wounded	Officers Missing	Enlisted Missing
Boonville	17 June 1861	0	0	0	6	0	0
Dug Spring	25 July 1861	0	0	0	0	0	0
McCulloch's Store	26 July 1861	0	0	0	0	0	0
Dug Spring	2 August 1861	0	0	0	0	0	0
McCulloch's Store	3 August 1861	0	0	0	0	0	0
Wilson's Creek	10 August 1861	1	66	2	210	2	6

== Notable members ==
- Francis Preston Blair Jr., original commander of the regiment, later promoted to major general of volunteers.
- John Schofield, future Secretary of War and Commanding General of the United States Army
