= 54th Ohio Infantry Regiment =

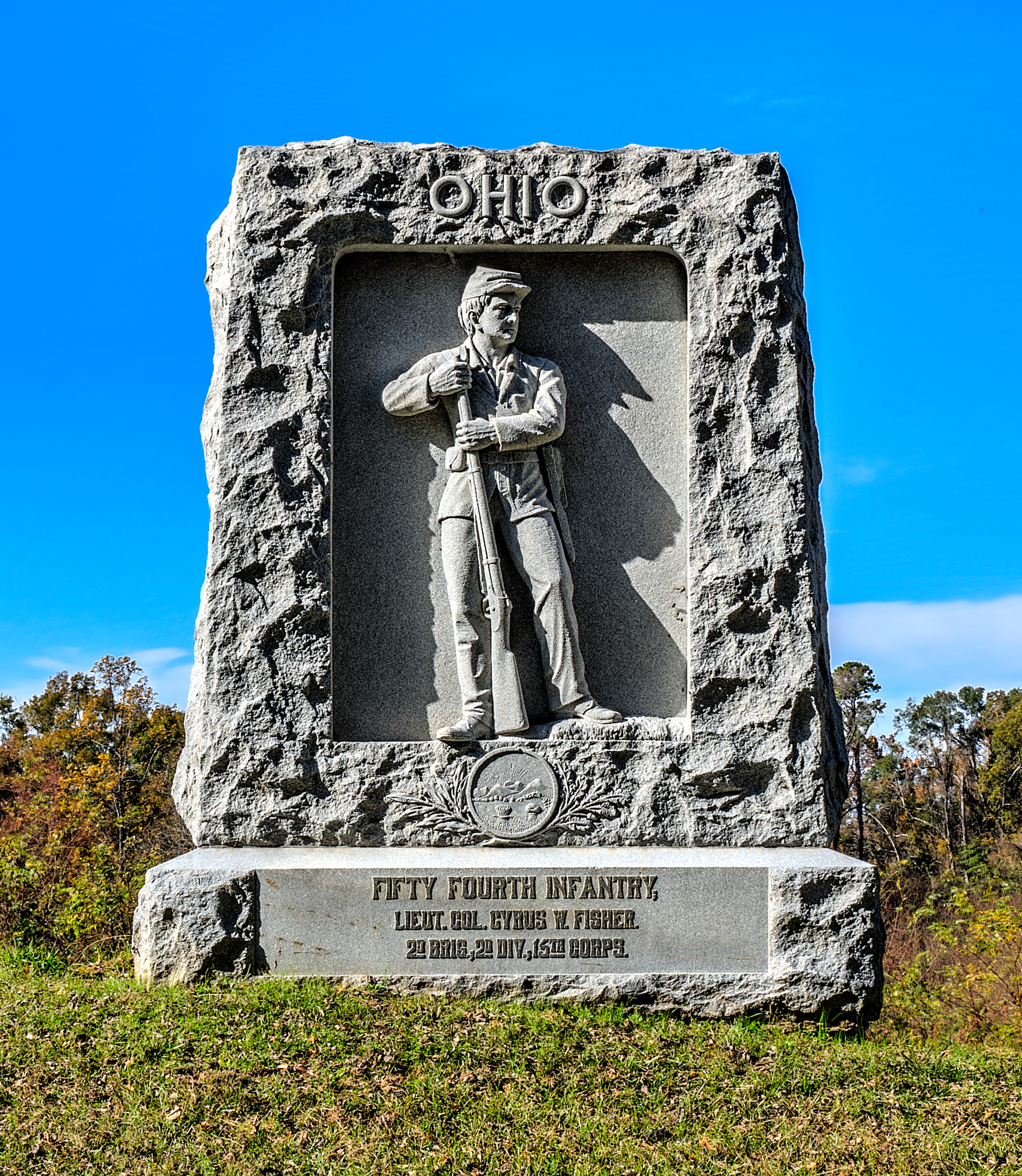
- Memorial at Vicksburg National Military Park
- Active: October 1861 to August 15, 1865
- Country: United States
- Allegiance: Union
- Branch: Union Army
- Type: Infantry
- Size: 200
- Engagements: Battle of Shiloh; Siege of Corinth; Battle of Chickasaw Bayou; Battle of Fort Hindman; Battle of Champion Hill; Siege of Vicksburg; Siege of Jackson; Battle of Missionary Ridge; Atlanta campaign; Battle of Resaca; Battle of Dallas; Battle of New Hope Church; Battle of Allatoona; Battle of Kennesaw Mountain; Battle of Atlanta; Siege of Atlanta; Battle of Jonesboro; Battle of Lovejoy's Station; Sherman's March to the Sea; Carolinas campaign; Battle of Bentonville

The 54th Ohio Infantry Regiment was an infantry regiment in the Union Army during the American Civil War. They wore Zouave uniforms that were identical to those of the 34th Ohio Infantry Regiment (Piatts Zouaves.)

== Service ==
The 54th Ohio Infantry Regiment was organized at Camp Dennison near Cincinnati, Ohio, in October 1861 and mustered in for three years service under the command of Colonel Thomas Kilby Smith (Note: Born in Boston, Massachusetts into a prominent New England family, Smith moved with his family as a young child to Cincinnati, Ohio. He was educated in a military school and studied law in the office of Chief Justice Salmon P. Chase. In 1853, Franklin Pierce appointed him as the special agent in the Post Office Department at Washington, D.C., and later as United States Marshal for the Southern District of Ohio and deputy clerk of Hamilton County. He joined the army on September 9, 1861 as a lieutenant colonel and was later commissioned as the colonel of the regiment. For more information, see his Wikipedia article.) as a Zouave regiment. The regiment was recruited in Allen, Auglaize, Champaign, Clinton, Cuyahoga, Fayette, Greene, Highland, Lake, Logan, Morgan, and Preble counties.

While Col. Smith and his staff were still training the regiment, an army led by Brig. Gen. Ulysses S. Grant won two battles that were the most significant Union victories, at that time, of the American Civil War, the battles of Fort Henry and Fort Donelson on the Tennessee and Cumberland rivers respectively. These victories shut off the rivers to the Confederacy as transportation routes, and opened the way to restore federal authority at Nashville, an ironworks center, a major producer of gunpowder, a major supply depot, a major agricultural crop collection point, and a converging point for railroads.

The Confederacy's defeats at Fort Henry and Donelson made it abandon Kentucky and parts of Tennessee. Their last troops in Nashville left on February 23. Their Western Theater commander, Gen. Albert Sidney Johnston, made the controversial decision to quit the region, and despite political unhappiness in Richmond, his consolidation of troops further south precluded being could cut off in Kentucky and major portions of Tennessee. He planned to consolidate forces in Corinth, MS just over the state line. (Note: The town of Corinth had strategic value because it was at the intersection of two railroads, including one that was part of the rail network used to move Confederate supplies and troops between Tennessee and Virginia.) By the end of March, Johnston had over 40,000 Confederate troops at Corinth.

Realizing that his troops were too spread out, the theater commander, Maj. Gen. Halleck decided to concentrate troops at Pittsburg Landing,9 miles (14 km) upriver (south) of Savannah, where the armies could advance on a good road to Corinth, Mississippi. The town was a junction of two vital railroad lines, the Mobile and Ohio Railroad (M&ORR) and the Memphis and Charleston Railroad (M&CRR), called by some "the vertebrae of the Confederacy." Halleck argued Richmond and Corinth were the great strategic points of the war, and all efforts should be made to take Corinth and thereby make rebel control of railroads west of the East Tennessee bastion of Chattanooga meaningless.

=== Shiloh ===
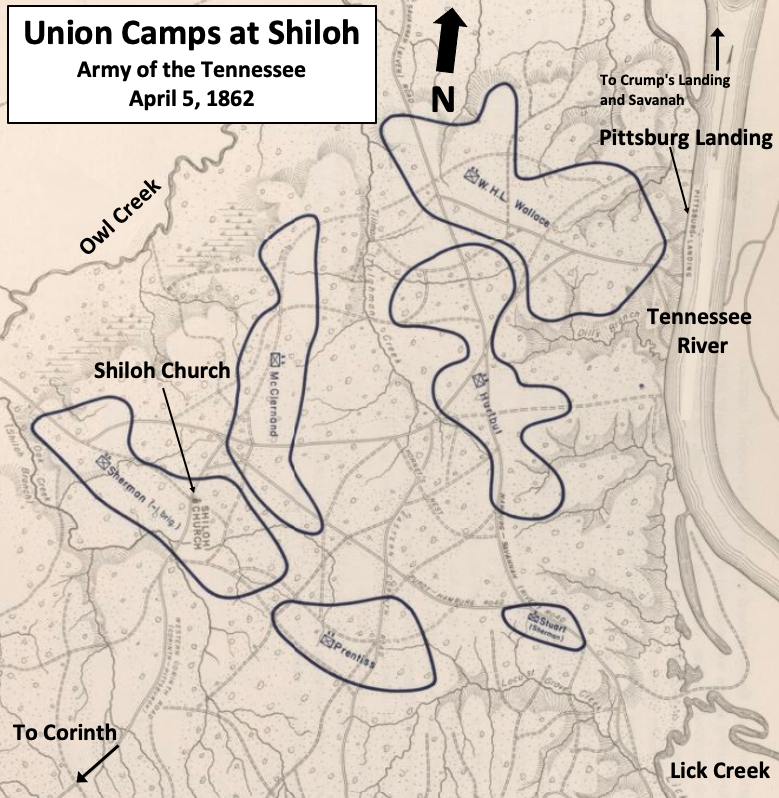
Union camps at Shiloh

On Monday, February 17, 1862, the 850 men of the 54th Ohio Zouaves left Cincinnati via the Ohio River and sailed downriver reaching Paducah, KY, three days later, February 20. There, Col. Smith and his regiment were assigned to Col Stuart's (Note: Born in Brooklyn to a wealthy fur trader, he received an elite education from Phillips Academy, Oberlin College, and Amherst College, graduating from the latter in 1838. He then moved with his father to Michigan, where the younger Stuart was a lawyer. After serving one term in Congress, he moved to Chicago, Illinois to return to law where his reputation was ruined by a divorce case scandal. For more information, see his Wikipedia article here.) 2nd Brigade in Brig. Gen. Sherman's 5th Division. (Note: The brigade contained 55th Illinois (Lieut, Col. Oscar Malmborg)and the 71st Ohio (Col. Rodney Mason) as well as the 54th Ohio.) Two weeks later, March 6, the 54th Ohio boarded river steamers and sailed up the Tennessee River. After joining the AoT at Savannah from Wednesday through Friday, March 12–14, the 54th and its division disembarked at Pittsburg Landing Monday, March 17. After organizing itself at the landing, Sherman's division marched west 3 miles (4.8 km), and camped near Shiloh Church. The men noted the army's position was somewhat shaped like a triangle, with the sides formed by various creeks and the river. The land was mostly wooded, with scattered cotton fields, peach orchards, and a few small structures. They camped with their brigade to the east and left of the main Corinth road. (Note: As part of the process of turning raw volunteers into a professional army, Grant insisted on discipline and the 54th Zouaves' officers were under orders to live in tents with their men instead of imposing on local citizens. Brigade officers were only permitted to requisition quarters if the dwellings were contiguous to their brigade's camp.) The 54th as part of Stuart's brigade shifted camp closer on Wednesday nearly 2 miles (3.2 km) closer to the Tennessee at Bell Field at the junction of the Savannah and Hamburg roads to guard the ford over Lick Creek.The regiment spent the next fortnight in camp training, drilling, preparing for the expected advance, and patrolling south in the woods towards Corinth.

In between the 54th Ohio and Sherman's three other brigades was Brig. Gen Prentiss' 6th Division, and between the Shiloh Church area and the river were Maj. Gen. McClernand's 1st Division and Brig. Gen. Hurlbut's 4th Division. Behind the 54th Ohio in Stuart's brigade and closest to the landing was Brig. Gen. W.H.L. Wallace's 2nd Division. (Note: Maj. Gen. Lew Wallace 's 3rd Division was at Crump's Landing, five miles (8.0 km) downstream (north) of the Union campsites. While on his mid-March mission to damage a railroad, his men learned that a large Confederate force was nearby. Because of this, his division remained near Crump's Landing.)

The Union plan was to combine Grant's and Buell's armies and continue south and capture Corinth, which would be a springboard to take Memphis, Vicksburg, and large portions of Confederate territory. While most of the AoT was near Pittsburg Landing in early April, one division was 5 miles (8.0 km) downstream (north) at Crump's Landing, and the army headquarters remained further north in Savannah. Buell's army was on the way from Nashville to Savannah. (Note: The Union army move from Nashville to Savannah was delayed by the slow construction of a bridge across the Duck River at Columbia. Eventually, one division forded the river before the bridge was completed, and that division would be the first to arrive in Savannah.) Hallek ordered Grant to avoid an engagement until "properly fortified" and ordered to do so. Wet weather meanwhile was hampering Grant's efforts to keep his artillery and supplies with his infantry as the roads were in terrible condition.

Johnston realized he could soon be outnumbered with 42,000 men at Corinth, and 15,000 more on the way, (Note: Maj. Gen. Earl Van Dorn's small Confederate army of 15,000 men was ordered to Corinth, but would not arrive in time for the Battle of Shiloh.) while the not–yet–combined Union force could number 75,000 men. Seizing the initiative, Johnston decided to surprise Grant on April 4 before Buell arrived from Nashville. Inexperience and bad weather caused the 20 miles (32 km) march north to take longer than he expected, and his troops were not in position until Saturday afternoon, April 5. On Friday, April 4, pickets under Col. Ralph P. Buckland made contact with some of Johnston's cavalry who drove them back to about a 1.5 miles (2.4 km) in advance of his center, on the 54th Ohio's right on the main Corinth road. Sherman sent his cavalry at them in pursuit driving them back about 5 miles (8.0 km). The cavalry did not see the rest of Johnston's army, and Sherman and Grant were not concerned by their presence, with Sherman writing, "yet I did not believe that he designed anything but a strong demonstration." This may have been fueled by lack of contact by other patrols such as the six companies Stuart sent out on the Hamburg road, with a squadron of cavalry sent forward by General McClernand, to reconnoiter beyond Hamburg on Saturday.

The Confederates spent Saturday night, April 5 in the woods south of the Union campsites. Johnston's plan was to attack the Union left, pushing it northwest against the swampy land adjacent to Snake and Owl creeks. Confederate troops along the Tennessee River would prevent Union reinforcements and resupply. Despite the cavalry skirmish on Friday, the AoT did not expect a fight at that location and did not form a defensive line nor make any entrenchments. Sherman dismissed the April 4 contact as a reconnaissance. Grant had ordered all his commanders to be careful to avoid a battle before Buell arrived. Further sightings and incidents throughout Saturday were likewise dismissed. After hearing of sightings of Confederates at Seay Field, Col. Everett Peabody, commanding Prentiss' 1st Brigade, grew concerned, and around midnight Saturday, sent a five company patrol to investigate. Prentiss was not informed, and the patrol advanced from their camp on the 54th Ohio's right southwest down a farm road leading to Pittsburg-Corinth Road.

==== First Day's Battle ====
Around 5:00 a.m., Sunday, April 6, Confederate pickets from a battalion in Brig. Gen. Wood's 3rd Brigade of Maj. Gen. Hardee's 3rd Corps (Note: Hardee's corps like Breckenridge's had only three brigades unlike Polk's and Bragg's which had two divisions of three brigades each.) opened fire on Powell's men in the southeast corner of James J. Fraley's 40-acre (16 ha) cotton field before withdrawing. Unaware that rebel skirmish lines were already behind his left and right rear, Powell advanced within from 200 yards (180 m) of the battalion, where the Confederates opened fireleading to a fiece fight between these two small forces fighting for over an hour.

By 5:30 a.m., Johnston and his staff heard the firing and ordered a general attack. Keeping Beauregard in the rear directing men and supplies, he rode to the front to lead his men, effectively ceding control of the battle to Beauregard. (Note: Under tremendous pressure to perform well after the losses in Tennessee, Johnston thought he could make his army more effective by inspiring his inexperienced troops in person.) Meanwhile, Powell sent word back to Peabody that he was being driven back by an enemy force of several thousand. Meanwhile, Prentiss was outraged to learn Peabody had sent out a patrol and accused him violating Grant's order to avoid provoking a major engagement. However, he soon realized a large Confederate force was attacking and sent reinforcements forward. The five-company patrol partially spoiled the Confederate element of surprise and gave Stuart's brigade on the AoT's left, and the rest of the army, time albeit brief to stand to arms and form up. As the Zouaves and other regiments stood to arms, some Union commanders still were unconvinced that they were under attack, and Sherman himself was not convinced until his 7:00 a.m. ride to investigate the commotion near Rea Field. In response, Sherman quickly and sent word to McClernand asking him to support his left and to Hurlbut, asking him to support Prentiss. (Note: After Johnston's 5:30 order for a general attack, it took an hour before all Confederate troops were ready. Another hour was lost skirmishing at Seay Field (close to Fraley Field) which reduced his advantage of surprise. The Confederate army alignment was another issue that helped reduce the attack's effectiveness. Hardee's and Bragg's corps began the assault with their divisions in one line that was nearly 3 miles (4.8 km) wide. At 7:30 a.m,, Beauregard sent Polk's and Breckinridge's corps forward on the left and right of the line, which only extended the line and diluted the effectiveness of the two attacking corps.) It became impossible for Johnston to control the intermingled units, so his corps commanders decided to divide the battlefield and lead their battlefield portion instead of their own corps. The rebel attack went forward as a broad frontal assault. Johnston and Beauregard did not put more strength on their right, which, fortunately for the 54th Ohio, meant they did not focus on turning the Union left.

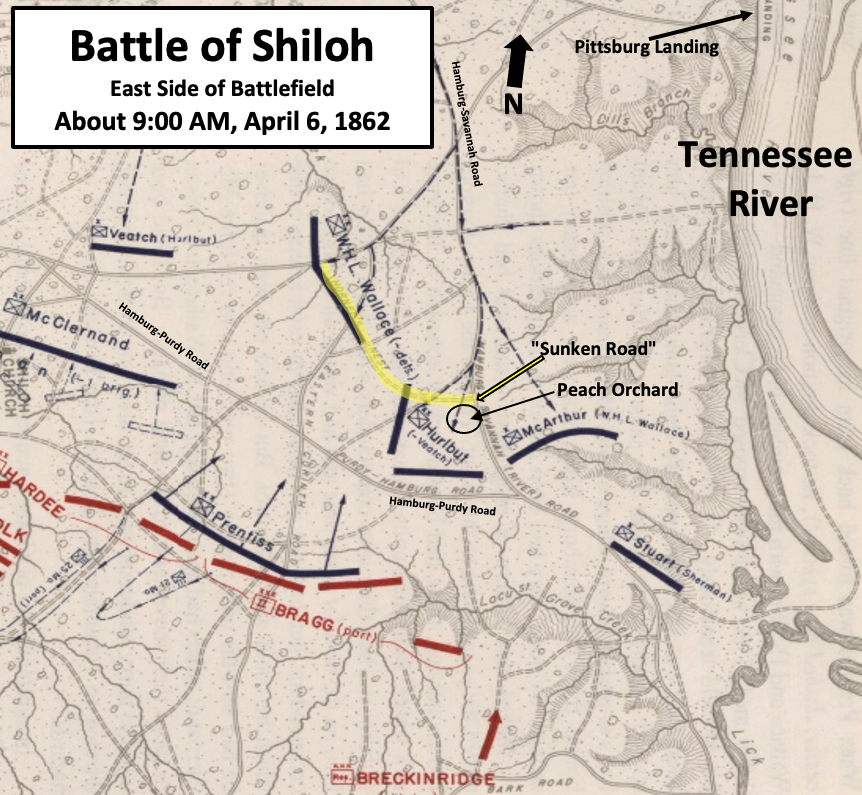
At 9:00 am, Stuart could hear artillery fire, but was not yet attacked

Grant, at his Savannah headquarters having breakfast, heard the distant sounds of artillery fire. Grant was waiting for more of Buell's army to arrive in Savannah. Ahead of most of his divisions, Buell and his 4th Division under Brig. Gen. Nelson had already arrived in Savannah, and they were walking to Grant's headquarters when Grant departed by boat for Pittsburg Landing. Grant ordered Nelson to march his division along the east side of the river to a point opposite Pittsburg Landing, where it could be ferried over to the battlefield. Grant then took his steamboat, Tigress, south, stopping at Crump's Landing to tell Lew Wallace to get his division ready to move, and Grant arrived at Pittsburg Landing around 9:00 a.m. (Note: Sources have slight differences for Grant's Pittsburg Landing arrival time. Cunningham says around 8:00 a.m. Esposito says 8:30 a.m. Daniel and McPherson say 9:00 a.m. Chernow says Grant disembarked around 9:00 a.m.) Grant rode inland and confirmed that Johnston had launched a full-scale attack. He sent a message to back to Lew Wallace at Crump's Landing to bring his division to the battlefield. (Note: This order would be the subject of controversy, as Lew Wallace disputed where he was told to go and by what route, and claimed the copy of the order was lost.)

After initial contact, McLernand and Hurlbut had pushed forward in line with Sherman and behind Prentiss who was locked in a contest slightly forward of the rest of the AoT. The 54th Ohio in Stuart's brigade remained separated from Sherman on the extreme left of the AoT. At 7:30 a.m., Stuart received word from Prentiss that he had the enemy in his front in force followed by reports from his pickets that rebel infantry with artillery coming toward their position. Soon after that, Stuart saw the Pelican flag of Bragg's Louisiana troops advancing in the rear of Prentiss. He quickly sent his adjutant, 1st Lieut. Charles Loomis, (Note: Loomis had been a 1st Lieutenant in Company I.) of the 54th Ohio, to tell Hurlbut Prentiss' left was turned, and to ask him to advance. Hurlburt replied that he would advance immediately and within fifteen minutes one of Hurlbut's battery took position on the road immediately by Mason's 71st Ohio, Stuart's rightmost regiment, followed by the 41st Illinois in line on the right of this battery. W.H.L. Wallace hadf seen the same gap and sent a brigade forward from the landing to fill a gap between Hurlbut's position at a peach orchard and Stuart's brigade. Wallace's remaining brigades moved into positions near Duncan Field and what is now called the "Sunken Road," between McClernand's and Hurlbut's divisions.

Meanwhile, the Zouaves of the 54th Ohio had heard musketry early in the morning, but did not realize they were under attack until they heard artillery. At 9:30 a.m., Johnston received reports that Union soldiers were deploying on his right flank. In response, he sent two brigades from Bragg's Corps there and called up Breckinridge's Reserve Corps. What his scouts had actually found was the 54th Ohio's and their brigade's camp. Around 9:40 a.m., the 54th Ohio began receiving artillery fire, and twenty minutes later, they and their brigade were attacked by Confederate infantry. The 30-year-old commander of Company D, Capt. Israel T. Moore later wrote that the Zouaves waited laying down in the woods on the rise until the rebels, crossing an openm field, were within 17–25 yards (16–23 m) when the 54th Ohio rose, advanced, and "fired with terrible effect," driving them back to the woods out of sight on the other side of the ravine before dropping back in the woods forming squares protect against cavalry. When no mounted attack manifested, the squares broke and the regiment reformed line of battle among the trees. Once they saw Confederate infantry reappearing 110 yards (100 m) across the ravine, the men again down and waited. As before, they before when the rebels were in the open nearing their woods, they rose and opened fire.

Stuart abandoned his camps and formed his line up on the north side of the ravine between the Savannah-Purdy Road and the river - 71st Ohio right, 55th Illinois center, and 54th left -with two companies of the 55th and two of the 54th out as skirmishers on the lower hills across the ravine overlooking the Savannah-Purdy Road. Meanwhile, the Zouaves of the 54th Ohio had heard musketry on their right, but did not realize they were under attack until they heard artillery. At 9:30 a.m., Johnston received reports that Union soldiers were deploying on his right flank, so he sent two brigades from Bragg's Corps there and called up Breckinridge's Reserve Corps. What his scouts had actually found was the 54th Ohio's brigade forming up. Around 9:40 a.m., the Zouaves began receiving artillery fire, and twenty minutes later, they and their brigade were attacked by Confederate infantry who drove the skirmishers back to their regiments. The Confederate onslaught gradually pushed the AoT's line back inflicting significant losses on the AoT, but southeast of the Sunken Road, Stuart still held the Union left. Chalmers' and Jackson's brigades attacked Stuart's three regiments. When the rebels succeeded in placing the battery on the hills formerly occupied by his skirmishers, Stuart went in search of the battery on his right to counter it, but the battery and the infantry on its right had disappeared.

He saw no organized units, only disorganized men streaming to the rear, between him and Hurlbut's troops. He could see a large body of the enemy's troops approaching and that his position would inevitably be flanked. When he returned to his brigade, the enemy was making gains. The intensity of the fight increased around 11:15 a.m, causing most of the 71st Ohio Infantry Regiment to flee to the rear. (Note: Col. Rodney Mason, commander of the 71st Ohio, fled to the rear, and many of his men followed him. His Lieut. Col. Barton S. Kyle was killed when he attempted to rally the regiment. After another incident that occurred in August 1862, Mason was cashiered.) Before he could reposition to cover their absence, the 55th Illinois and 54th Ohio were heavily engaged.

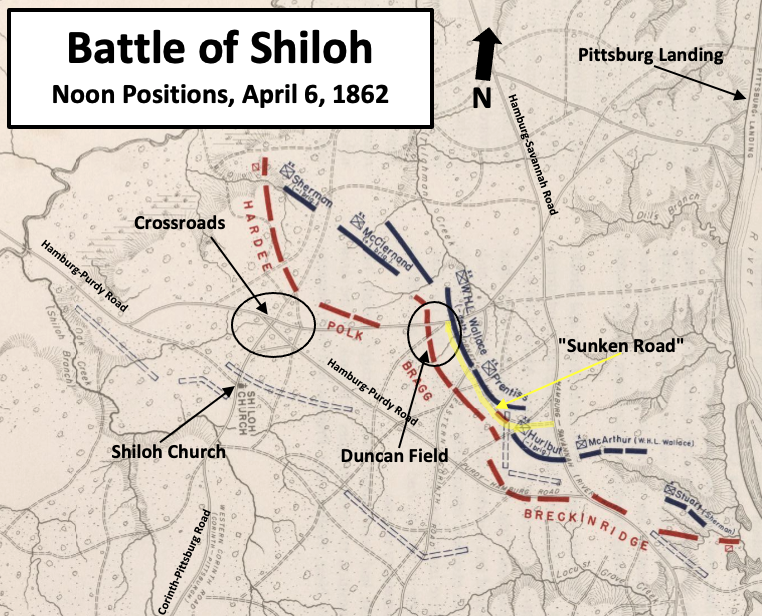
By noon, the Union right was pushed back and the left was threatened

As soon as possible, Stuart withdrew the remaining 800 men of the two regiments to a higher, more defensible position where they brought the rebels to a standstill. When rebel infantry tried to flanking his left through the woods by the Tennessee, Stuart extended his flank with four companies of the 54th under Major Cyrus W. Fisher, (Note: The 34-year-old Fisher would be promoted to Lieutenant Colonel the following November and the discharge in September 1863.) who held them in check. The two lines at the extreme left, about 150 yards (140 m) apart, fought for upwards of two hours. The rebels were protected by trees while within the grove, but an open, level, and smooth field lay between them and the four companies of Zouaves. Fisher, "perfectly calm and serene" kept urging his men on through the fight. Stuart knew he was outnumbered but fought on and held to keep the Confederates from advancing to the Tennessee, and secondly because he received a message from Brig. Gen. McArthur, commander of W. H. L. Wallace's 2nd Brigade. He had ridden forward from Pittsburg Landing to investigate in person, and promised to fill the gap on Stuart's right.

During the action, the two regiments observed a battery to their southeast in position to enfilade their line, but it had little effect by firing too high. McArthur's promised support never appeared on their right. The men's ammunition was exhausted, and they had emptied the cartridge boxes of the killed and wounded, leading to a slackening of their fire. Stuart was worried of a further rebel advance which could have easily shattered the survivors of the brigade. After consulting Smith and Malmborg, (Note: Malmborg was a Swedish immigrant, born on the Baltic Sea island of Gotland, who had emigrated to the United States in 1846 and fought in the Mexican War. From 1853 to 1861 he worked for the Illinois Central Railroad where ha met Abraham Lincoln. He returned to Europe to promote emigration to America was appointed vice consul of Norway and Sweden by Lincoln in 1861, but he returned to military service and commissioned as a lieutenant colonel. For more information see his Wikipedia article here.) Stuart ordered a withdrawal back through the next ravine to a hill on their right. After an orderly retreat to that point, they found a rebel battery had moved up to a commanding position within 600 yards (550 m) on their left. Stuart repositioned his remaining two regiments, but eventually they began panicking. When some men from the 54th Ohio broke and fled, Col. Smith went to the landing to bring them, and any other brigade members, back, leaving Lieut. Col. Farden in command.

By noon, the Union right was a disorganized group of individual soldiers and portions of regiments. Still, Sherman and McClernand fought on with the remnants of their divisions. The situation at the Union center was much better. Prentiss repelled multiple attacks, and Confederate losses were considerable. The Union left, even more so than the right, was pushed back. The 55th Illinois and 54th Ohio fought on and made several stands east of Bell Field against two of Bragg's brigades. The continued shelling compelled Stuart to withdraw further, sheltering the command as well as possible by ravines and circuitous paths, finally reaching a cavalry camp just south of the landing where the brigade reformed.

On their way, a small remnant of the 71st Ohio, under command of its adjutant, 1st Lieut. James H. Hart. Fortunately for the 54th Ohio and the rest of the Union army, Bragg's hungry men had exhausted their ammunition and pillaged food from the Union camps instead of continuing the attack. Finding the rebels had broken contact and fearing ammunition resupply would never reach his brigade, Stuart ordered the brigade to march to toward the landing. A quarter of a mile short of the batteries, one of Grant's staff officers stated that ammunition was on the way and ordered all movement to the rear stop.

Although Stuart restored order, he was wounded in the shoulder and turned the command over to Smith, the next senior in rank, and went to the landing for treatment. Smith temporarily left command fell to the 55th Illinois' Lieut. Col. Malmborg as Smith went in search of Fisher's Zouaves who had become detached.

Meanwhile, Grant, passing by, ordered Malmborg to form a line near some batteries lined up south of the landing. Around 2:15 p.m., Smith returned with Major Fisher and his men and took command. Through Malmborg's efforts, Smith commanded a line of over 3,000 men composed of the brigade augmented by remnants of other regiments who had retreated towards the landing. At this point, Major George W. Andrews, of the 71st, rejoined the brigade with about 150 men. (Note: Andrews had rallied this group at the Tennessee riverbank, where he hailed the gunboats, relating them of the approach of the enemy.) By 2:30 p.m., the 54th Ohio was done fighting for the day. At this time, south of the battlefield, Johnston, the rebel commander had bled to death from wounds. Much of the brigade who had broken had rallied and were in the last engagement near the batteries.

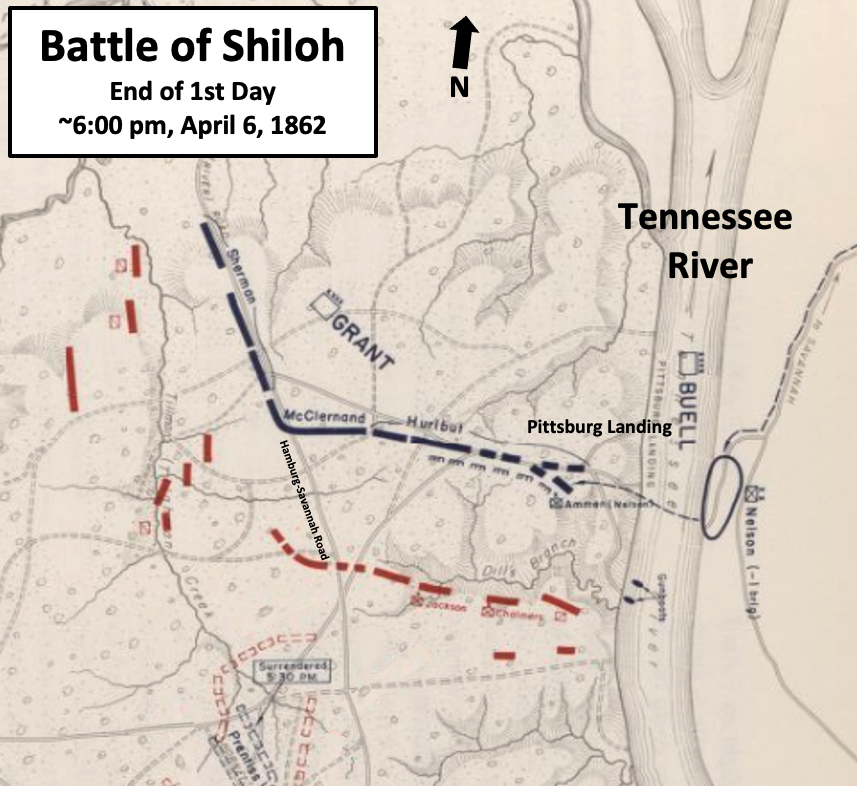
Positions at the end of the first day

Instead of bypassing Prentiss and Wallace in the Hornet's Nest, the Confederates spent time and resources assaulting them. Shortly after 4:00 p.m., realizing that they were going to be surrounded, Wallace began leading his division north, and 15 minutes later, he was mortally wounded as most of his division escaped encirclement. By 4:45 p.m, Prentiss was left alone, and within 45 minutes Prentiss and his command were captured. The Hornet's Nest bought Grant precious time to stabilize and prepare a defensive line from Pittsburg Landing to the Hamburg-Savannah Road and further north. (Note: Daniels uses the term "Grant's Last Line" for Grant's defensive position in his map showing positions at 6:00 pm on the first day of the battle.)

Sherman commanded the right of the line, and McClernand took the center. On the left were the remnants of W.H.L. Wallace's and Hurlbut's division. At the landing were 10,000 to 15,000 stragglers and noncombatants. The line included the artillery bolstered by the two gunboats in the river. Grant rode up and down the line, urging the men to keep firing at their enemy. The 54th Ohio and its brigade regrouped back within these lines.

The AoT had suffered high casualties and many men had fled in terror to the river, but Grant had managed to get 18,000 men in a line from west to east of Sherman, McClernand, Hurlbut, and Nelson's (AoO) divisions. Prentiss' division was effectively destroyed, and Col. Tuttle was reorganizing W.H.L. Wallace's division behind the line. Most of the camps had been captured, leaving these hungry and tired men to sleep in the open in the rain and cold weather.

The stabilization let Sherman reunite his division and he had Smith move the brigade down the line to take up his division's left flank near the center of the line. Stuart, after treatment for his wound yet still unfit for duty, rejoined his brigade but kept Smith in command who took the 54th Ohio, 55th Illinois, and the remnants of the 71st Ohio into position near the center of the line on Sherman's left. At 7:15 p.m., Lew Wallace's 5,800 man division arrived and were positioned on Sherman's right. Brig. Gen. Crittenden's AoO 5th Division began arriving antgering the line between Hurlbut's and Nelson's divisions at 9:00 pm, giving Buell 18,000 men available for the battle.

At dusk, Buell learned from Sherman that Grant planned to attack at dawn and made an agreement that Grant would command the west of the line, while Buell would plan his own attack on the east side. Between midnight and 4:00 a.m., Buell's 2nd Division under Brig. Gen. McCook's arrived in Savannah and began steaming upriver with the first unit disembarking at Pittsburg Landing around 4:00 a.m. On the other side, the confederates, now under Beauregard were only reinforced by the poorly-armed 600 raw recruits of the Confederate 47th Tennessee that arrived at 8:00 a.m. After his casualties and men who had fled from the battle, Beauregard's Confederate army now numbered fewer than 20,000 fighters.

==== Second Day's Battle ====
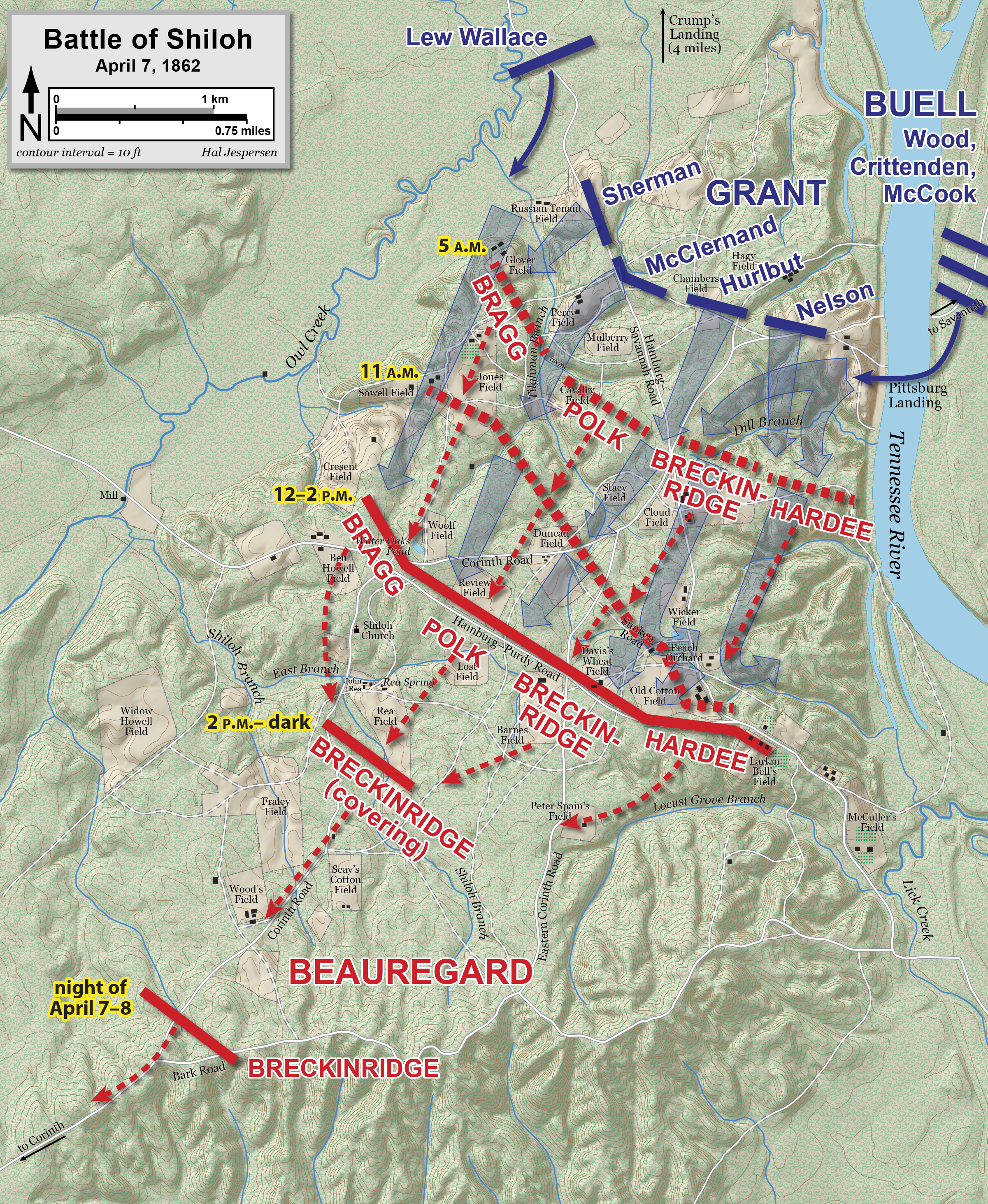
General overview of April 7

The AoO attacked at 5:00 a.m., Monday, April 7, with Nelson on the left joined a few hours later on his right by Crittenden. As they advanced dispersing enemy skirmishers, McCook gradually joined them on the right. Hardee commanded the rebels'right, and Nelson's men scattered Forrest's cavalry regiment and small portions of Chalmers's Brigade before hitting Chalmer and a makeshift brigade. Despite losses, Nelson's men swept forward through the Davis Wheat Field and Sara Bell Field until running out of steam after three hours of. As Hardee fell back around noon, Nelson pulled back to Wicker Field. Despite Crittenden and McCook being stopped at Duncan field, by noon, Buell had control of the Hornet's Nest.

Meanwhile, Grant attacked at the other end of the linen with Lew Wallace's fresh troops driving one of Bragg's exhausted rebel brigades from Jones Field. After an ineffective Confederate counterattack, Sherman attacked, and the Zouaves moved forward. Smith, Stuart observed, was constantly rallying, encouraging, and fighting his men under incessant fire, disregarding his personal safety, and the Confederates were pushed back. Miroring Buell's divisions, McClernand and Hurlbut soon advanced, and all four AoT divisions advanced at 10:30 am. An unsuccessful counterattack by Cleburne's brigade (Note: This six regiment brigade had dwindled to 800 men) took significant further casualties.

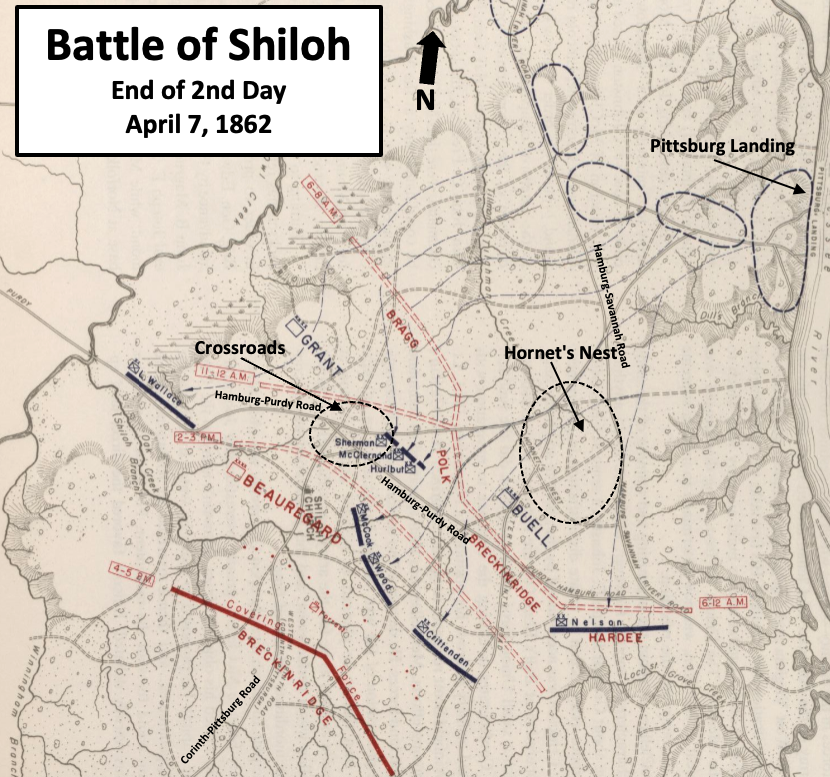
Positions at the end of the second day

Momentum had shifted to U.S. forces, and Buell attacked again shortly after noon, and within about two hours, Nelson and Crittenden reached the Hamburg-Purdy Road. Further west, McCook's advance westward on the Corinth-Pittsburg Landing Road opened a gap with Crittenden that Grant filled with AoT brigades from his reserve. After six hours against Buell's fresh troops, the Confederate's resistance was close to ending.

The 54th and its brigade were stopped at noon by Cheatham's counterattack which drove Sherman and McClernand back about 300 yards (270 m). Despite light opposition at his front, Lew Wallace halted his men in a defensive position, and did not resume the offensive until Sherman and McClernand had stopped and pushed back Cheatham. Bragg formed another line by Water Oaks Pond, stalled the AoT's advance for two hours. Further rebel counterattacks proved only temporary successes and Beauregard was forced back, and Union troops crossed the Hamburg-Purdy Road at 2:30 p.m. Stuart, as an observer, was impressed with the performance of regiments, Smith, Malmborg, and his aide from the 54th Ohio, Loomis.

After learning that Van Dorn was too far away to help him, Beauregard, around 2:00 p.m., had Breckinridge form a rear guard near Shiloh Church where rebel artillery around it began a bombardment to deceive Grant and Buell was still present. Around 3:30 pm, the bombardment ceased as the last batterery limbeed up and left for Corinth.

Grant and Buell did not pursue Beauregard, and rain started at 6:30 p.m, turned to sleet as the temperature dropped. The battle was over with a huge number of casualties on both sides. The Zouaves of the 54th Ohio had survived a baptism of fire and, despite initial reverses, ended the battle victorious. It had been a fierce and brutal contest for the Zouaves. Over the two days of fighting, the regiment sustained a loss of 15 killed, 139 wounded, and 12 captured for a total of 166, almost a fifth of its original strength. The toll was heavy among the company officer and noncommissioned officer (NCO) leadership: Company A lost one NCO killed and two wounded and disabled, including its 1st Sergeant, Henry C Winder; Company B lost three NCOs wounded and disabled; Company C lost one NCO killed, its company commander, Capt Charles A White, mortally wounded as well as its 1st Sergeant, Fergus Mitchell, and another NCO mortally wounded; Company D lost one NCO killed and two wounded and disabled; Company E was hit hard with two NCOs killed and four wounded and disabled; Company F also lost its commander, Capt Peter Bertram and an NCO were killed, two NCOs were mortally wounded, and one was captured and later died as a POW; Company G was also hit hard losing one NCO killed, one NCO mortally wounded, and four NCOs wounded and disabled; Company H lost one NCO wounded and one NCO captured who also died as a POW; Company I lost one NCO wounded and disabled; and Company K lost one NCO wounded and disabled.

=== Siege of Corinth ===
After the battle the 54th recovered from its experience in their old camp south of Pittsburg Landing. Their brigade was now reduced to two regiments because the 71st Ohio had been sent to garrison Fort Donelson on Wednesday, April 16.

Meanwhile, on April 7, while Grant and Buell were driving Beauregard from the field, Pope's AoM captured Island Number 10, opening the river almost as far south as Memphis. Despite the victory, Halleck, Grant's immediate superior, severely criticized him for getting caught unprepared and for failing to pursue Beauregard. Hallek had intended to lead the federal advance on Corinth in the field against Johnston, but Shiloh had upset his schedule. He ordered Pope's AoM to come upriver to join the AoT and AoO.

Halleck arrived at Pittsburg Landing on Friday, April 11, and immediately assumed command in the field. On Monday, April 21, Pope's 30,000 man AoM arrived and went into camp at Hamburg landing 5 miles (8.0 km) upriver (south) of Pittsburg Landing. Hallek now had an artmy of over 100,000, but leery due to staggering losses at Shiloh, he began a slow, methodical campaign of offensive entrenchment, fortifying after each advance.

On Monday, April 28, Halleck now reorganized his three armies as the Department of the Mississippi with right, center, left, and reserve wings. Pulling Maj. Gen. Thomas and his division from Buell's AoO to the AoT, he gave him command of the right wing which was all of AoT except McClernand's and Wallace's divisions which became the reserve; McClernand got command of it. Buell and the rest of the AoO became the center, and Pope's AoM made up the left wing. Hallek named Grant to the powerless position of second-in-command and tactical command of the right wing and reserve.

Also on Monday, April 28, Grant ordered Sherman to move south a few miles the Corinth Road to Shiloh creek, fortify it, and then corduroy and expand the road leading to it. The next morning, the Zouaves of the 54th Ohio moved out with their brigade on Tuesday, April 29. At dusk, they halted at Camp No. 1, and the 54th Ohio began working on breastworks and the road. During the advance, as Hallek ordered, at every camp, the 54th would make new roads and repair existing ones, corduroy them, entrench the new position, and then use the roads to advance to the new position; the army built cross roads between the new positions to allow rapid troop concentration in case of attack. (Note: Per Grant, "The National armies were thoroughly intrenched all the way from the Tennessee River to Corinth.") On Wednesday, Sherman stressed strict discipline and alertness as they were in rebel country, ordering combat readiness at all times, finding a reliable water supply, ensuring daily drills, and robust guards on all regimental camps.

On Thursday, May 1, the Zouaves and their division continued their slow, methodical progress marching 6 miles (9.7 km)to Camp No. 2. After spending three days building built a line of defenses, the Zouaves and the entire division advanced again on Monday, May 5, stopping at dusk built fortifications again at Camp No, 3. After a day of hard working on the road and defenses on Tuesday, Sherman sent out orders to march the next morning 2 miles (3.2 km)to the west, or right, heading toward the M&ORR north of Corinth to build further fortifications.

On Tuesday, May 6, the 54th Ohio and its brigade marched west and stopped at dusk building Camp No. 4, on a rise near a place called Locust Grove. The regiment remained there until Sunday, May 11, when the division south-southwest down the Corinth road to another set of heights, Camp No. 5, just 7 miles (11 km)from Corinth On Monday, Hallek relieved Grant of tactical control of the right and reserve wings, exercising direct control of all wings from his headquarters. While Pope, at Hallek's direction, made a "fuss and demonstration" to distract the rebels on the left, the 54th Ohio moved with its division 2 miles (3.2 km)southwest to another ridge, Camp No. 6 with Hurlbut's division extending the camp's fortifications on its left. They remained there building, repairing, and drilling.

At this camp, Sherman 's four brigades within his division were unbalanced and many of the regiments had greatly reduced numbers due to Shiloh and disease. On Thursday, May 15, he reorganized the division three brigades of four regiments. The 54th Ohio and the 55th Illinois left the 2nd Brigade and moved into the 1st Brigade joining the newly arrived 8th Missouri and a regiment from the 3rd Brigade 57th Ohio under Lieut. Col. Rice. (Note: Rice, a 27-year-old Ohio native, had graduated from Union College and studied law. At the war's onset he had served as a company commander in the three-month iteration of the 21st Ohio before joining the 57th and rapidly rising to Lieut. Col. For more infoprmation, see his Wikipedia article here.) The 8th Missouri's commander, Col Morgan L. Smith, (Note: The 40-year-old Smith, born in New York, had moved to Indiana two decades before. He had raised and commanded the 8th Missouri. At Fort Donelson, he had performed well there and on the second day of Shiloh. For more information see his Wikipedia article here.) as the senior brigade officer, took command of the brigade. Hallek now ordered an "across-the-board" advance by all three wings. As such, at Camp No. 6, Sherman planned an attack against Chalmers' brigade, which was in a strong defensive position at the Russell House on the next rise to the south overlooking Phillips Creek. Smith's 1st and Denver's 3rd Brigades would lead the attack with Hurlbut's division in support. On Saturday, May 17, around 3:00 p.m., he attacked against stubborn resistance. The Zouaves of the 54th spoiled a flank attack against the 1st Brigade's right. An initial lack of solid ground for artillery contributed to the difficulty in driving the Confederates from their positions, but once artillery was brought forward to a strongh position, the infantry charged sending Chalmers' men in retreat beyond Philips Creek. The 54th Ohio and their brigade stopped and occupied high ground on which the house stood. Although "skirmishing severely" in the foiling of the flanking attack, it proved to be disappointingly, to the Zouaves, the only action at the house for them, yet they suffered no casualties.

=== Commands ===
The regiment was attached to District of Paducah, Kentucky, to March 1862. 2nd Brigade, 5th Division, Army of the Tennessee, to May 1862. 1st Brigade, 5th Division, Army of the Tennessee, to July 1862. 1st Brigade, 5th Division, District of Memphis, Tennessee, to November 1862. 1st Brigade, 5th Division, District of Memphis, Tennessee, Right Wing, XIII Corps, Department of the Tennessee, November 1862. 1st Brigade, 2nd Division, Right Wing, XIII Corps, to December 1862. 2nd Brigade, 2nd Division, Sherman's Yazoo Expedition, to January 1863. 2nd Brigade, 2nd Division, XV Corps, Army of the Tennessee, to July 1865. Department of Arkansas to August 1865.

The 54th Ohio Infantry mustered out of service on August 15, 1865, in Little Rock, Arkansas.

== Affiliations, battle honors, detailed service, and casualties ==
=== Organizational affiliation ===
Attached to:

- District of Paducah, KY, to March, 1862
- 2nd Brigade, 5th Division, Army of the Tennessee (AoT), to May, 1862
- 1st Brigade, 5th Division, AoT to July 1862
- 1st Brigade, 5th Division, District of Memphis, to November, 1862
- 1st Brigade, 5th Division, Right Wing XIII Corps (Old), AoT, November, 1862
- 1st Brigade, 2nd Division, Right Wing XIII Corps AoT, to December, 1862
- 2nd Brigade, 2nd Division, XV Corps, AoT, to July, 1865
- Department of Arkansas to August, 1865.

=== List of battles ===
The official list of battles in which the regiment bore a part:

- Battle of Shiloh
- Siege of Corinth
- Battle of Chickasaw Bayou
- Battle of Fort Hindman
- Battle of Champion Hill
- Siege of Vicksburg
- Siege of Jackson
- Battle of Missionary Ridge
- Atlanta campaign
- Battle of Resaca
- Battle of Dallas
- Battle of New Hope Church
- Battle of Allatoona
- Battle of Kennesaw Mountain
- Battle of Atlanta
- Siege of Atlanta
- Battle of Jonesboro
- Battle of Lovejoy's Station
- Sherman's March to the Sea
- Carolinas campaign
- Battle of Bentonville

=== Detailed service ===
The regiment's detailed service was as follows:

==== 1862 ====
- Left Ohio for Paducah, Ky., February 17, 1862.
- Moved from Paducah to Savannah, Tenn., March 6–12, 1862.
- Expedition to Yellow Creek, Miss., and occupation of Pittsburg Landing, Tenn., March 14–17.
- Battle of Shiloh, Tenn., April 6–7.
- Advance on and siege of Corinth, Miss., April 29-May 30.
- Russell's House, near Corinth, May 17.
- March to Memphis, Tenn., via LaGrange, Grand Junction and Holly Springs, June 1-July 21.
- Duty at Memphis until November.
- Expedition from Memphis to Coldwater and Hermando, Miss., September 8–13.
- Grant's Central Mississippi Campaign, "Tallahatchie March," November 26-December 13.
- Sherman's Yazoo Expedition December 20, 1862, to January 3, 1863.
- Chickasaw Bayou December 26–28, 1862.
- Chickasaw Bluff December 29.

==== 1863 ====
- Expedition to Arkansas Post, Ark., January 3–10, 1863.
- Assault and capture of Fort Hindman, Arkansas Post, January 10–11.
- Moved to Young's Point, La., January 17–21, and duty there until March.
- Expedition up Rolling Fork via Muddy, Steele's and Black Bayous and Deer Creek, March 14–27.
- Demonstrations on Haines and Drumgould's Bluffs April 29-May 2. Moved to join army in rear of Vicksburg, Miss., May 2–14, via Richmond and Grand Gulf.
- Battle of Champion Hill May 16.
- Siege of Vicksburg, Miss., May 18-July 4.
- Assaults on Vicksburg May 19 and 22.
- Advance on Jackson, Miss., July 4–10.
- Siege of Jackson, Miss., July 10–17.
- Camp at Big Black until September 26.
- Moved to Memphis, Tenn., then march to Chattanooga, Tenn., September 26-November 21.
- Operations on Memphis & Charleston Railroad in Alabama October 20–29.
- Bear Creek, Tuscumbia, October 27.
- Chattanooga-Ringgold Campaign November 23–27.
- Tunnel Hill November 23–24.
- Missionary Ridge November 25.
- Pursuit to Graysville November 26–27.
- March to relief of Knoxville November 28-December 8.
- March to Chattanooga, Tenn., then to Bridgeport, Ala., Bellefonte, Ala., and Larkinsville, Ala., December 13–31.

==== 1864 ====
- Duty at Larkinsville, Ala., to May 1, 1864.
- Expedition toward Rome, Ga., January 25-February 5.
- Atlanta Campaign May 1 to September 8.
- Demonstration on Resaca May 8–13.
- Near Resaca May 13.
- Battle of Resaca May 14–15.
- Movements on Dallas May 18–25.
- Operations on line of Pumpkin Vine Creek and battles about Dallas, New Hope Church and Allatoona Hills May 25-June 5.
- Operations about Marietta and against Kennesaw Mountain June 10-July 2.
- Assault on Kennesaw June 27.
- Nickajack Creek July 2–5.
- Chattahoochie River July 6–17.
- Battle of Atlanta July 22.
- Siege of Atlanta July 22-August 25.
- Ezra Chapel, Hood's 2nd sortie, July 28.
- Flank movement on Jonesboro August 25–30.
- Battle of Jonesboro August 31-September 1.
- Lovejoy's Station September 2–6.
- Operations in northern Georgia and northern Alabama against Hood September 29-November 3.
- March to the sea November 15-December 10.
- Siege of Savannah December 10–21.
- Fort McAllister December 13.

==== 1865 ====
- Campaign of the Carolinas January to April 1865.
- Salkehatchie Swamps, S.C., February 2–5.
- Cannon's Bridge, South Edisto River, February 9.
- North Edisto River, February 11–13.
- Columbia February 16–17.
- Battle of Bentonville, N.C., March 20–21.
- Occupation of Goldsboro March 24.
- Advance on Raleigh April 10–14.
- Bennett's House April 26.
- Surrender of Johnston and his army.
- March to Washington, D.C., via Richmond, Va., April 29-May 19.
- Grand Review of the Armies May 24.
- Moved to Louisville, Ky., June 2, thence to Little Rock, Ark., and duty there until August.

=== Casualties ===
The regiment lost a total of 233 men during service; 4 officers and 83 enlisted men killed or mortally wounded, 3 officers and 143 enlisted men died of disease.

== Commanders ==
- Colonel Thomas Kilby Smith - promoted
- Colonel Cyrus W. Fisher
- Lieutenant Colonel James A. Farden - commanded at the Battle of Shiloh after Col Smith succeeded to brigade command
- Major Robert Williams Jr. - commanded at the Battle of Missionary Ridge

== Notable members ==
- Private Henry G. Buhrman, Company H - Medal of Honor — Participating in a diversionary "forlorn hope" attack on Confederate defenses, May 22, 1863. The Cincinnati native was 19-years-old at the time.
- Sergeant James Jardine, Company F - Medal of Honor — Participating in the same "forlorn hope." The Scottish immigrant was 26-years-old at the time.
- Corporal David Jones, Company C - Medal of Honor — Participating in the same "forlorn hope." The Fayette County native was 22-years-old at the time. in the same "forlorn hope." The New York native was 19-years-old at the time.
- Colonel Thomas Kilby Smith - Lawyer, diplomat, and journalist.
- Private Jacob Swegheimer, Company I - Medal of Honor — Participating in the same "forlorn hope." The Kingdom of Württemberg (modern day Baden-Württemberg, Germany) immigrant was 20-years-old at the time.
- Private Edward Welsh, Company D - Medal of Honor — Participating in the same "forlorn hope." The Irish immigrant was 20-years-old at the time.
- Major Robert Williams Jr. - Olympic archer who won two individual silver medals and a team gold medal in archery at the 1904 Summer Olympics in St Louis at age 62.

== See also ==
- List of Ohio Civil War units
- Ohio in the Civil War
