= Boatner =

Boatner is a surname. Notable people with the surname include:

- Bryant L. Boatner (1907–1986), United States Air Force Lieutenant general
- Charles J. Boatner (1849–1903), American politician
- Edward Boatner (1898–1981), American composer
- Haydon L. Boatner (1900–1977), United States Army Major general
- Joseph Boatner (1918–1989), American singer
- Mack Boatner (born 1958), American football player
- Mark M. Boatner III (1921–2006), American soldier, historian, and author

== See also ==
- Boatner House
