= David Stuart (brigadier general) =

Union Army officer and politician

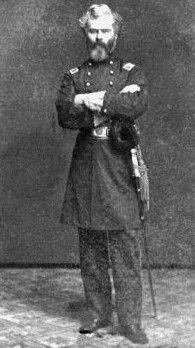
- Col. David Stuart
- Born: March 12, 1816; Brooklyn, New York, U.S.
- Died: September 11, 1868 (aged 52); Detroit, Michigan, U.S.
- Burial place: Elmwood Cemetery, Detroit, Michigan
- Relatives: Robert Stuart (father)
- Military career
- Allegiance: United States of America; Union
- Branch: United States Army; Union Army
- Rank: Brigadier General (rejected by United States Senate)
- Conflicts: American Civil War: Battle of Shiloh; Siege of Corinth; Battle of Chickasaw Bayou; Battle of Arkansas Post
- Other work: U.S. Congressman from Michigan

David Stuart (March 12, 1816 – September 11, 1868) was a politician and lawyer who served as an officer in the Union Army during the American Civil War. Born in Brooklyn, Stuart moved with his father to Michigan, where the younger Stuart was a lawyer. After serving for a term in the United States House of Representatives from 1853 to 1855, he moved to Chicago, Illinois, where he practiced law. His reputation was destroyed by a scandal relating to a divorce case. In 1861, Stuart raised two regiments for service in the American Civil War. On October 31 of that year, Stuart became the colonel of the 55th Illinois Infantry Regiment. He led a brigade at the Battle of Shiloh, where he was wounded in the shoulder on April 6, 1862. After commanding a regiment during the Siege of Corinth later that year, Stuart was provisionally appointed brigadier general on November 29. He led first a brigade, and then a division at the Battle of Chickasaw Bayou in December, and also led a division at the Battle of Arkansas Post in January 1863. On March 11, 1863, Stuart's promotion to brigadier general was rejected by the United States Senate for unknown reasons. He resigned from the army in April and returned to the practice of law, dying in 1868.

== Early life and education ==
Stuart was born in Brooklyn, New York, on March 12, 1816. His father was the fur trader Robert Stuart. He attended Phillips Academy, Oberlin College, and Amherst College, graduating from the latter in 1838. Stuart and his father moved to Michigan, and the younger Stuart passed the bar in 1842. He served for a time as the city attorney for Detroit, Michigan, and became the prosecuting attorney for Wayne County, Michigan in 1844.

== Political career ==
In 1852, Stuart was elected to represent Michigan's 1st congressional district in the United States House of Representatives as a Democrat. While in office, he chaired the Committee on Expenditures in the Department of the Treasury. Stuart stood for re-election two years later but was defeated by William A. Howard. A 1907 work produced by the Michigan Pioneer and Historical Society states that Stuart "had the reputation of being one of the most effective stump speakers in Michigan, and was one of the most popular [D]emocrats of Detroit". Overall, his congressional term lasted from March 4, 1853, to March 3, 1855. An 1860 article in the New York Times attributed his electoral loss to his stance on the Kansas-Nebraska Act; the 1907 Michigan Pioneer and Historical Society work attributes his defeat to "the changing tide of Michigan politics". In 1855, he moved to Chicago, Illinois, as his law practice had been affected by his foray into politics. There he worked for the Illinois Central Railroad as a solicitor and befriended Stephen Douglas. The historian Larry Tagg states that he became a "high-powered Chicago attorney". However, his reputation was ruined when a scandal broke out over accusations that he had an affair with a client in a divorce case. The case, which occurred in 1860, involved Isaac Burch, a Chicago banker, accusing his wife, Mary Burch, of adultery with Stuart; Mary denied the affair and accused Isaac of infidelity.

== Military career ==
In 1861, Stuart raised two regiments for service in the American Civil War, the 42nd Illinois Infantry Regiment and the 55th Illinois Infantry Regiment; he then paid for the equipping of the two units with his own funds. The raising of the two regiments was controversial because of Stuart's bad reputation, and the 55th carried poor quality weapons as a result. Stuart had been denied permission to form the regiments by the Illinois governor due to the public outcry against Stuart, who appealed directly to the United States federal government for permission. He became lieutenant colonel of the 42nd on July 22 of that year, and then colonel of the 55th on October 31. As commander of the 55th, Stuart's ignorance of military affairs became obvious, and he had Lieutenant Colonel Oscar Malmborg conduct all regimental training. This decreased the amount of respect his men had for him, and having Malmborg conduct all of the training prevented Stuart himself from learning. His men also thought that he orated excessively, and Malmborg was unpopular with the men. By February, a soldier in the regiment was reporting that the officers were unhappy with Stuart and Malmborg. The historian Victor Hicken considers both Stuart and Malmborg to have been incompetent.

Stuart was elevated to brigade command in William T. Sherman's division on February 27, 1862. His brigade was part of Sherman's division when it camped near Pittsburg Landing, Tennessee, in March. Stuart's brigade of slightly less than 2,000 men consisted of three inexperienced regiments, including the 55th Illinois, and was positioned in an area isolated from the rest of Sherman's division. On the morning of April 6, Stuart's brigade's camp was attacked by Confederate forces during the Battle of Shiloh. Stuart's men became disordered, but Stuart rallied two of his three regiments. During the fight, he took a shoulder wound and turned over command to Colonel Thomas Kilby Smith. Malmborg made the tactical error of forming the 55th Illinois into a square formation, a tactic that Stuart also had a fondness for. Stuart's two rallied regiments fought until they ran out of ammunition in the afternoon and then were engaged on the second day of the battle as well.

Stuart had recovered enough to resume command of his regiment in the Siege of Corinth, and was later transferred to the occupation of Memphis, Tennessee. He led the 4th Brigade of the District of Memphis in the XIII Corps from October 26 to November 12, 1862. From November 12 to December 18 he then commanded the 2nd Brigade of the 2nd Division of the District of Memphis in the XIII Corps, which was part of the Army of the Tennessee. Stuart received an appointment to the rank of brigadier general on November 29, but this could not be finalized because the United States Senate was not in session. On December 28, Stuart commanded a brigade in the Battle of Chickasaw Bayou and took divisional command after the wounding of Morgan L. Smith. He continued in divisional command at the Battle of Arkansas Post in January 1863; this was as part of Major General John A. McClernand's Army of the Mississippi. A reorganization of the Union forces occurred shortly after the fighting at Arkansas Post; McClernand's army was discontinued and was divided into a new XIII Corps and the XV Corps, the latter of which was commanded by Sherman. After the reorganization, Stuart commanded the 2nd Division of the XV Corps. On March 11, Stuart's promotion to brigadier general was rejected by the Senate. Later in the month, Stuart commanded his division during the Steele's Bayou Expedition. News of the rejection of Stuart's promotion reached the Army of the Tennessee in early April, and as a result, Sherman removed him from command. The historian Ezra J. Warner states that it is not known why Stuart's promotion was denied. He resigned from the military on April 3. Stuart then returned to Detroit where he worked as a lawyer. Following a postwar move to New Orleans, Louisiana, where he also practiced law, Stuart returned to Detroit in 1868 and died there on September 11 of that year. His cause of death was paralysis. He is buried in Elmwood Cemetery.

== See also ==
- Bibliography of the American Civil War

== Sources ==
- Basch, Norma (1999). Framing American Divorce: From the Revolutionary Generation to the Victorians. Berkeley, California: University of California Press. ISBN 0-520-21490-0.
- Bearss, Edwin C. (1991) [1986]. The Campaign for Vicksburg. Vol. II: Grant Strikes a Fatal Blow. Dayton, Ohio: Morningside Bookshop. ISBN 0-89029-313-9.
- Boatner, Mark M. III (1988). The Civil War Dictionary (Revised ed.). New York: David McKay. ISBN 978-0-8129-1726-0.
- Daniel, Larry J. (1997). Shiloh: The Battle that Changed the Civil War. New York City: Simon & Schuster. ISBN 0-684-80375-5.
- Eicher, John H.; Eicher, David J. (2001). Civil War High Commands. Stanford, California: Stanford University Press. ISBN 978-0-8047-3641-1.
- Franck, Michael S. (1996). Elmwood Endures: History of a Detroit Cemetery. Detroit, Michigan: Wayne State University Press. ISBN 0-8143-2606-4.
- Hicken, Victor (1991) [1966]. Illinois in the Civil War. Urbana, Illinois: University of Illinois Press. ISBN 0-252-06165-9.
- Historical Collections: Collections and Researches Made by the Michigan Pioneer and Historical Society. Lansing, Michigan: Wynkoop Hallenbeck Crawford Company, State Printers. 1907.
- Smith, Timothy B. (2023). Bayou Battles for Vicksburg: The Swamp and River Expeditions, January 1–April 30, 1863. Lawrence, Kansas: University Press of Kansas. ISBN 978-0-7006-3566-5.
- Tagg, Larry (2017). The Generals of Shiloh: Character in Leadership, April 6–7, 1862. El Dorado Hills, California: Savas Beatie. ISBN 978-1-61121-369-0.
- Warner, Ezra J. (2006) [1964]. Generals in Blue: Lives of the Union Commanders. Baton Rouge, Louisiana: Louisiana State University Press. ISBN 0-8071-3149-0.
- Welcher, Frank J. (1993). The Union Army 1861–1865: Organization and Operations. Vol. II: The Western Theater. Bloomington, Indiana: Indiana University Press. ISBN 0-253-36454-X.
- Woodworth, Steven E. (2005). Nothing But Victory: The Army of the Tennessee, 1861–1865. New York City: Alfred A. Knopft. ISBN 0-375-41218-2.

U.S. House of Representatives
| Preceded by Ebenezer J. Penniman | United States Representative for the 1st congressional district of Michigan; 1853–1855 | Succeeded by William Alanson Howard |
