= David Jones (Medal of Honor) =

David Jones (April 13, 1841 - June 18, 1911) was an American soldier and recipient of the Medal of Honor who received the award for his actions in the American Civil War.

== Biography ==
Jones was born in Fayette County, Ohio, on April 13, 1841. He served as a private with Company F of the 22nd Ohio Volunteer Infantry and then moved to Company C of the 54th Ohio Volunteer Infantry Regiment and eventually after his heroic efforts at Vicksburg as first lieutenant in Company I of the 54th Ohio Volunteer Infantry Regiment during the American Civil War. Prior to becoming a lieutenant, he was promoted to sergeant sometime in 1864. He earned his medal in action at the Battle of Vicksburg, Mississippi in a forlorn hope attack on Vicksburg with 149 other men on May 22, 1863. In 1865, he married Rosellie A. Smith and made a living in Good Hope, Ohio. Jones and Smith had six children. He received his medal on June 13, 1894. He died on June 18, 1911, as a result of heart failure and is now buried in Good Hope Cemetery, Good Hope, Ohio.

== Medal of Honor Citation ==
For gallantry in the charge of the volunteer storming party on 22 May 1863, in action at Vicksburg, Mississippi.
