= Edward Welsh (soldier) =

Union Army Medal of Honor recipient (1843–1929)

- Born: January 3, 1843; Ireland
- Died: February 1, 1929 (aged 86); Washington, DC
- Burial place: Mount Olivet Cemetery, Washington, DC
- Military career
- Allegiance: United States of America; Union
- Branch: United States Army; Union Army
- Rank: Sergeant
- Units: Company D, 54th Ohio Volunteer Infantry Regiment
- Conflicts: American Civil War; Siege of Vicksburg
- Awards: Medal of Honor

Edward Welsh (January 3, 1843 – February 1, 1929) was a Union Army soldier during the American Civil War. He received the Medal of Honor for gallantry during the Siege of Vicksburg on May 22, 1863. His surname is sometimes spelled Welch.

== Union assault ==
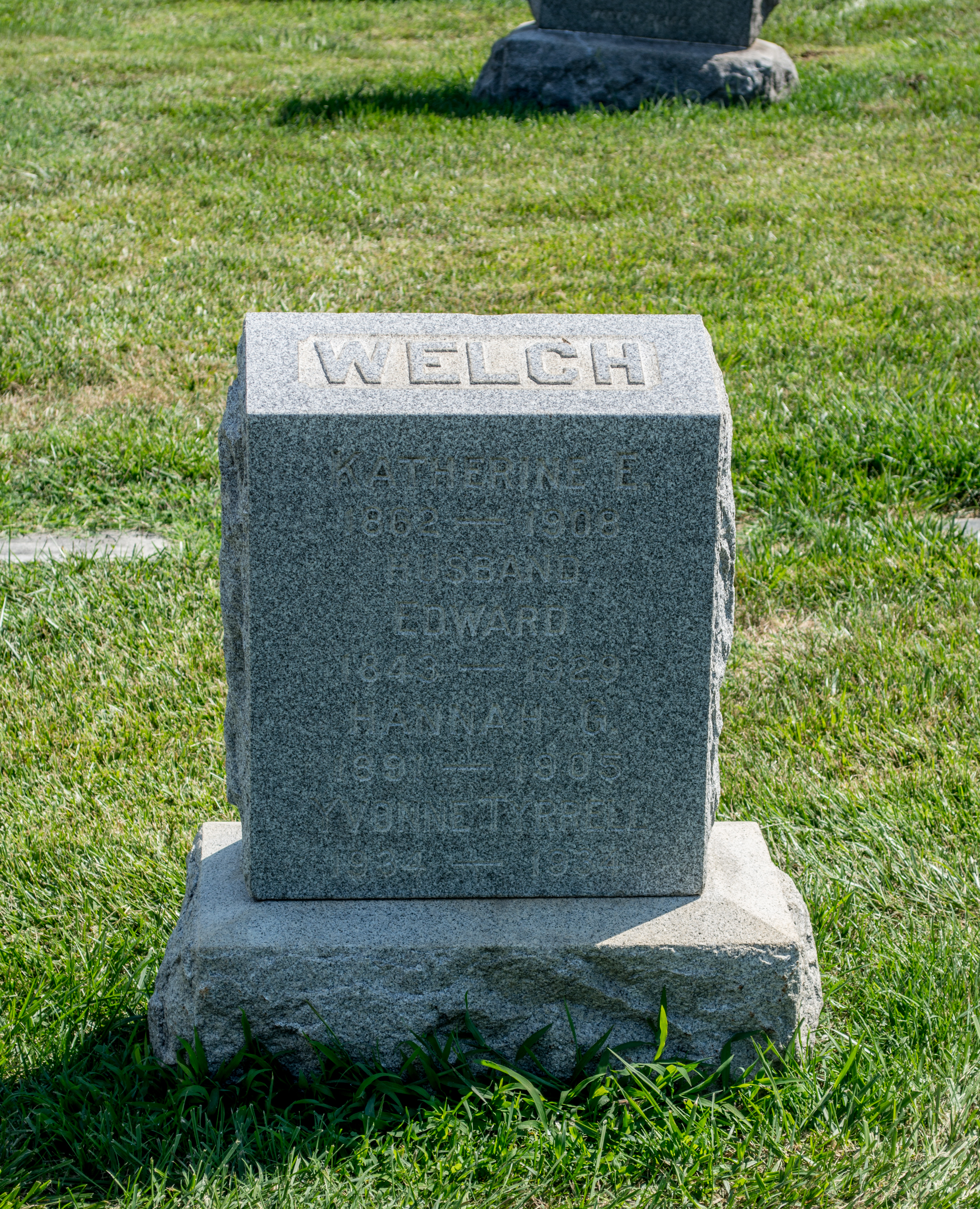
Grave of Edward Welsh at Mount Olivet Cemetery in Washington, D.C.

On May 22, 1863, General Ulysses S. Grant ordered an assault on the Confederate heights at Vicksburg, Mississippi. The plan called for a storming party of volunteers to build a bridge across a moat and plant scaling ladders against the enemy embankment in advance of the main attack. The volunteers knew the odds were against survival and the mission was called, in nineteenth century vernacular, a "forlorn hope". Only single men were accepted as volunteers and even then, twice as many men as needed came forward and were turned away. The assault began in the early morning following a naval bombardment. The Union soldiers came under enemy fire immediately and were pinned down in the ditch they were to cross. Despite repeated attacks by the main Union body, the men of the forlorn hope were unable to retreat until nightfall. Of the 150 men in the storming party, nearly half were killed. Seventy-nine of the survivors were awarded the Medal of Honor.

Welsh was married to Katharine Burke Welsh. He died in Washington, D.C., on February 1, 1929. He was interred at Mount Olivet Cemetery in Washington, D.C.

== See also ==
- List of Medal of Honor recipients
- List of American Civil War Medal of Honor recipients: T–Z
