= Bryant L. Boatner =

United States Air Force general (1907–1986)

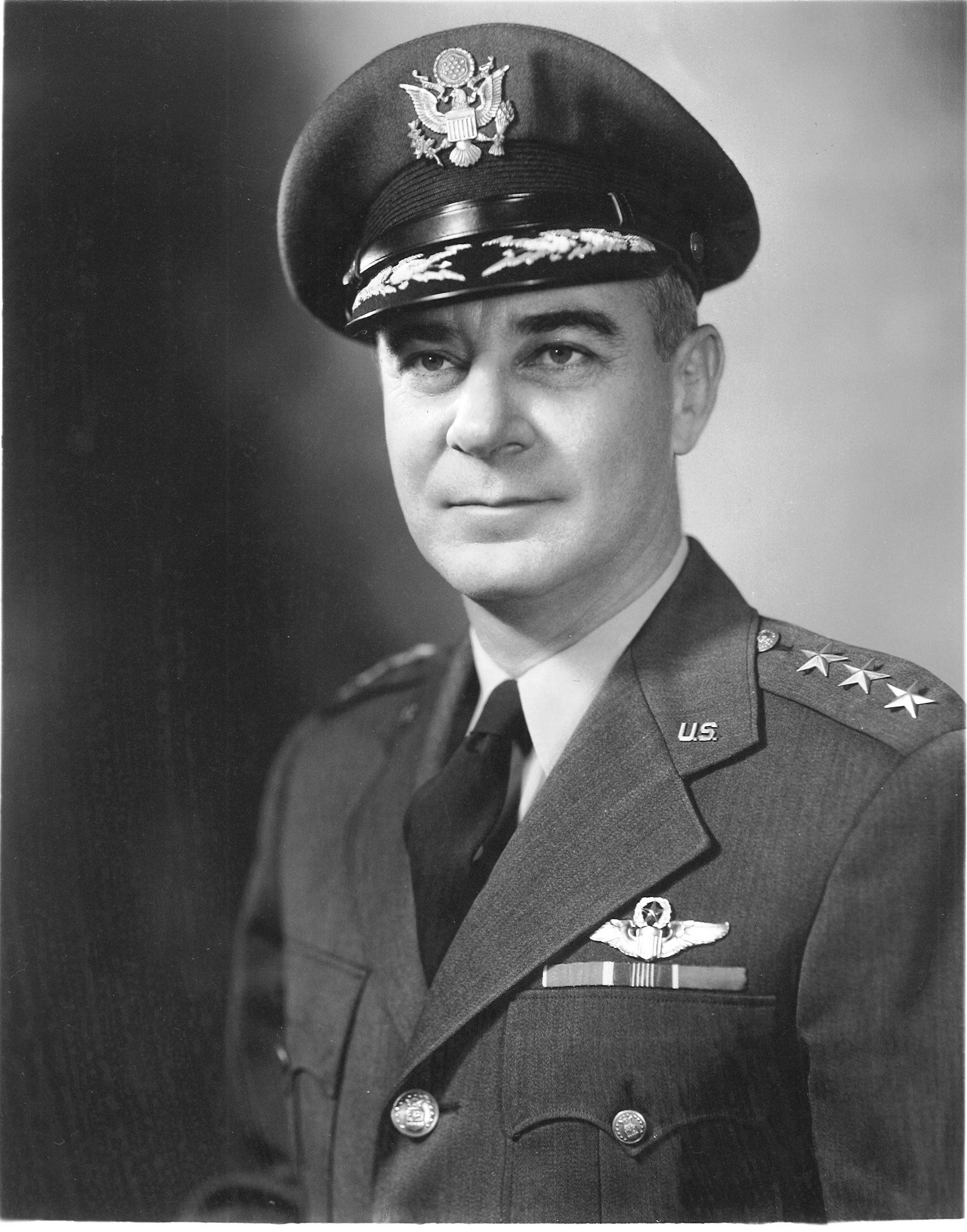
- Born: 9 April 1907; New Orleans, Louisiana
- Died: 16 December 1986 (aged 79)
- Burial place: Arlington National Cemetery
- Relatives: Haydon L. Boatner (brother); Mark M. Boatner III (nephew)
- Military career
- Allegiance: United States
- Branch: United States Army
- Service years: 1928–1955
- Rank: Lieutenant General
- Awards: Army Distinguished Service Medal; Legion of Merit

Bryant LeMaire Boatner (9 April 1907 – 16 December 1986) was a United States Air Force Lieutenant general.

== Early life and family ==
Boatner was born and raised in New Orleans, Louisiana. His father, Mark Mayo Boatner, graduated from Virginia Military Institute and was a respected lawyer and judge in New Orleans. His mother's maiden name was Byrd Elizabeth Bryant. He was one of six children: Mark II, Frank, Haydon (who became an Army Major general), Charlotte and Elizabeth (Betty).

== Military career ==
At West Point in 1928

He graduated from the United States Military Academy and was commissioned a second lieutenant of Field Artillery in 1928. After attending flying schools at Brooks and Kelly Fields, Texas, he was transferred to the United States Army Air Corps as a Second lieutenant in November 1929, and assigned as squadron engineering and operations officer at Selfridge Field, Michigan. He was promoted to first lieutenant on 1 February 1934.

In October 1934, he was assigned to Wheeler Field, Hawaii as assistant station supply officer, operations officer and squadron commander. He was promoted to Captain (temporary) on 12 March 1935. In late 1936, he was assigned to Barksdale Field, Louisiana, where he served as operations officer, flight commanding officer and adjutant. In August 1938, he went to the Air Corps Engineering School at Wright Field, Ohio, from which he graduated a year later.

He was stationed at the Air Corps Engineering School from August 1939. He was promoted to Major (temporary) on 1 February 1941. He was transferred to the Special Projects Branch of the Production Engineering Section in July 1941. He was promoted to Lieutenant colonel (temporary) on 5 January 1942 and then to Colonel (temporary) on 1 March 1942. He became chief of the Special Projects branch in October 1942. He retained that position when the branch was redesignated the Aircraft Modification Section. In July 1943, he became assistant chief of the Production Division, serving until February 1944, when he was appointed assistant chief of the Inspection Division. Two months later he became chief of that division. In September 1944, he was named chief of the Quality Control Section of the Procurement Division, and in June 1945, was appointed deputy chief of the Procurement Division and chief of the Inspection Section.

In June 1945 he was sent to the 501st Army Air Force Base Unit in Washington, D.C. for indoctrination in Air Transport Command policies and procedures. In August 1945 he went to Europe as deputy division commander of the 1400th Army Air Force Base Unit, and in November 1945 he became commanding officer of the European Wing (Provisional) of Air Transport Command.

In April 1946, he was assigned to Army Air Force Headquarters as secretary of the air staff and executive to the deputy commander of the Army Air Force. In January 1947, he was designated deputy chief of Air Staff in addition to his other duties. On 4 February 1947 he was promoted to Brigadier general (temporary). In June 1947 he was relieved as executive to the deputy commander. In October 1947, after United States Air Force (USAF) headquarters was established, he was appointed secretary of the Air Staff.

Still at USAF Headquarters, he was appointed assistant deputy chief of staff for personnel and administration, in February 1948. On 8 April 1948 he was promoted to Major general (temporary). In May 1949 he became assistant comptroller, and in September of that year was redesignated assistant deputy chief of staff, comptroller.

He assumed command of the Air Proving Ground at Eglin Air Force Base, Florida, in July 1950.

Returning to USAF headquarters in July 1952, he was appointed Inspector General of the Air Force. On 5 September 1952 he was promoted to Lieutenant general (temporary). On 1 April 1954, he was designated deputy chief of staff, materiel, there.

On 31 August 1955 he retired from the USAF with 80 percent disability. In April 1961 a private bill was passed by the United States Senate providing for his retirement pay.

== Death ==
He died on 16 December 1986 and was buried at Arlington National Cemetery.
