= Battle of Chickasaw Bayou =

1862 battle of the American Civil War

- Part of the American Civil War
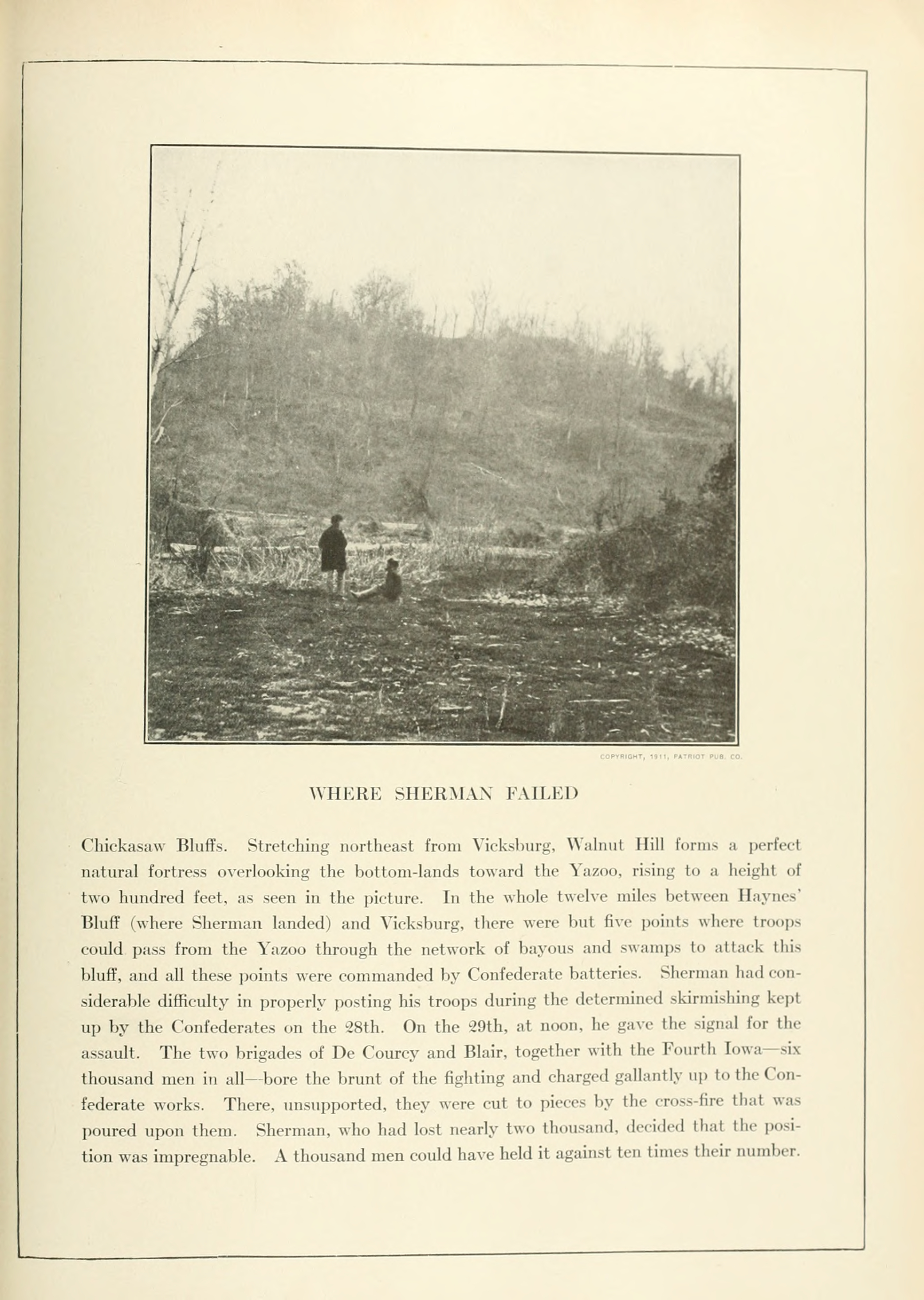
- "Where Sherman failed" (from the Photographic History of The Civil War)
Date	December 26–29, 1862
Location	Warren County, Mississippi 32°24′20″N 90°50′52″W
Result	Confederate victory

Belligerents
United States (Union)	(Confederate States of America) CSA (Confederacy)

Commanders and leaders
William T. Sherman	John C. Pemberton; Stephen D. Lee

Units involved
Army of the Tennessee; Mississippi River Squadron	Department of Mississippi and East Louisiana

Strength
30,720	13,792

Casualties and losses
1,776 (208 killed, 1,005 wounded, 563 captured/missing)	187 (57 killed, 120 wounded, 10 missing)

The Battle of Chickasaw Bayou, also called the Battle of Walnut Hills, fought December 26–29, 1862, was the opening engagement of the Vicksburg Campaign during the American Civil War. Confederate forces under Lt. Gen. John C. Pemberton repulsed an advance by Union Maj. Gen. William T. Sherman that was intended to lead to the capture of Vicksburg, Mississippi.

On December 26, three Union divisions under Sherman disembarked at Johnson's Plantation on the Yazoo River to approach the Vicksburg defenses from the northeast while a fourth landed farther upstream on December 27. On December 27, the Union army pushed their lines forward through the swamps toward the Walnut Hills, which were strongly defended. On December 28, several futile attempts were made to get around these defenses. On December 29, Sherman ordered a frontal assault, which was repulsed with heavy casualties, and then withdrew. This Confederate victory and the victory against Grant at Holly Springs frustrated Maj. Gen. Ulysses S. Grant's attempts to take Vicksburg by a direct approach.

== Background ==
Operations against Vicksburg and Grant's Bayou Operations. Confederate Union

Starting in November 1862, Maj. Gen. Ulysses S. Grant, commanding Union forces in Mississippi, undertook a campaign to capture the city of Vicksburg, high on the bluffs of the Mississippi River, one of two Confederate strong points (the other being Port Hudson, Louisiana) that denied the Union complete control of the Mississippi River. Grant split his 70,000-man army into two wings—one commanded by himself and one commanded by Maj. Gen. William T. Sherman. Sherman commanded the Right Wing, or XIII Corps, Army of the Tennessee, redesignated the XV Corps on December 22. His expeditionary force of 32,000 troops was organized into four divisions, commanded by Brig. Gens. Andrew J. Smith, Morgan L. Smith, George W. Morgan, and Frederick Steele.

Grant's wing marched south down the Mississippi Central Railroad, making a forward base at Holly Springs. He planned a two-pronged assault in the direction of Vicksburg. As Sherman advanced down the river, Grant would continue with the remaining forces (about 40,000) down the railroad line to Oxford, where he would wait for developments, hoping to lure the Confederate army out of the city to attack him in the vicinity of Grenada, Mississippi.

The seven gunboats and fifty-nine troop transports commanded by Rear Adm. David D. Porter departed Memphis, Tennessee, on December 20, stopped at Helena, Arkansas, to pick up additional troops, and arrived at Milliken's Bend above Vicksburg on December 24. After advancing up the Yazoo River, the transports disembarked Sherman's men at Johnson's Plantation, opposite Steele's Bayou, north of the city. Preceding the landing, the U.S. Navy conducted torpedo clearing operations on the Yazoo, during which the ironclad USS Cairo was sunk.

The Confederate forces opposing Sherman's advance were from the Department of Mississippi and East Louisiana, commanded by Lt. Gen. John C. Pemberton, a Pennsylvanian who chose to fight for the South. The officer in direct command of the defenses of Vicksburg was Maj. Gen. Martin L. Smith, who commanded four brigades led by Brig. Gens. Seth M. Barton, John C. Vaughn, John Gregg, and Edward D. Tracy. Brig. Gen. Stephen D. Lee commanded a provisional division with brigades commanded by Cols. William T. Withers and Allen Thomas; Lee was the primary commander of the Confederate defense in the Walnut Hills until the arrival late on December 29 of Maj. Gen. Carter L. Stevenson. Although the Union forces outnumbered the men to their front by two to one (30,720 to 13,792), they faced a formidable maze of both natural and man-made defenses. First was a thick entanglement of trees, which was broken intermittently by swampland. Chickasaw Bayou, a stream that was chest-deep, 50 yards wide, and choked with trees, also acted as a barrier to Sherman's men because it was parallel to the planned line of advance and hampers communication between units. Furthermore, the Confederates had formed dense barriers using felled trees for abatis.

== Opposing forces ==
Army Commanders at Chickasaw Bayou
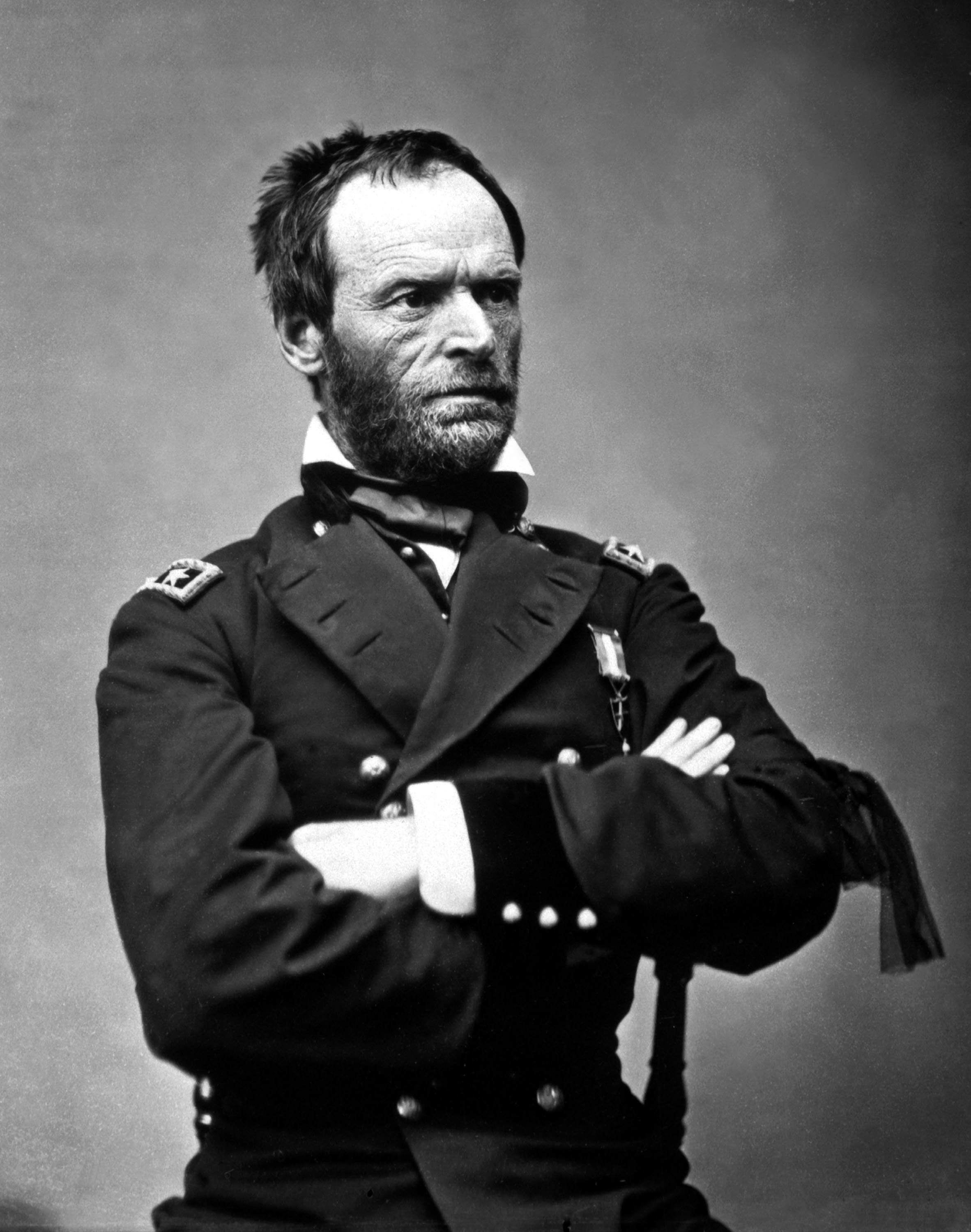
Maj. Gen.
William T. Sherman, USA

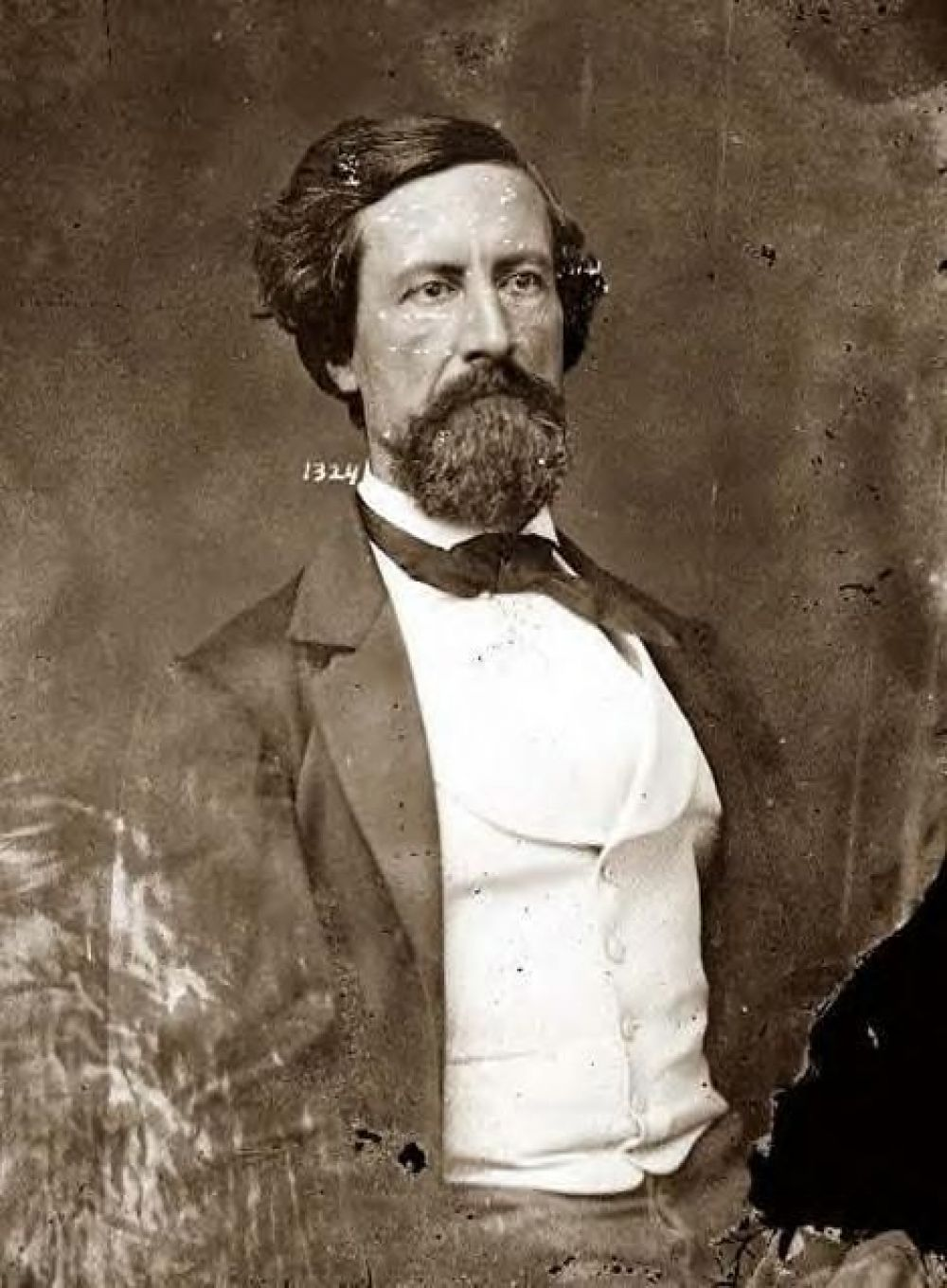
Lt. Gen.
John C. Pemberton, CSA

== Battle ==
On December 26, Sherman deployed the brigades of Col. John F. DeCourcy and Brig. Gens. David Stuart and Francis P. Blair Jr., to perform reconnaissance and find weaknesses in a Confederate defense. They moved slowly ahead through the difficult terrain, skirmishing with S.D. Lee's covering force that had been at Mrs. Lake's plantation. On December 28, Steele's division attempted to turn the Confederate right flank, but was repulsed by Confederate artillery fire as they advanced on a narrow front.

On the morning of December 29, Sherman ordered an artillery bombardment of the Confederate defenses to weaken them before a general Federal advance. For almost four hours, an artillery duel took place all along the line of battle, but did little damage. At 11 a.m., the duel ceased, and the infantry deployed into their lines of battle. Understanding the formidable nature of the Confederate fortifications, Sherman remarked, "We will lose 5,000 men before we take Vicksburg, and may as well lose them here as anywhere else."

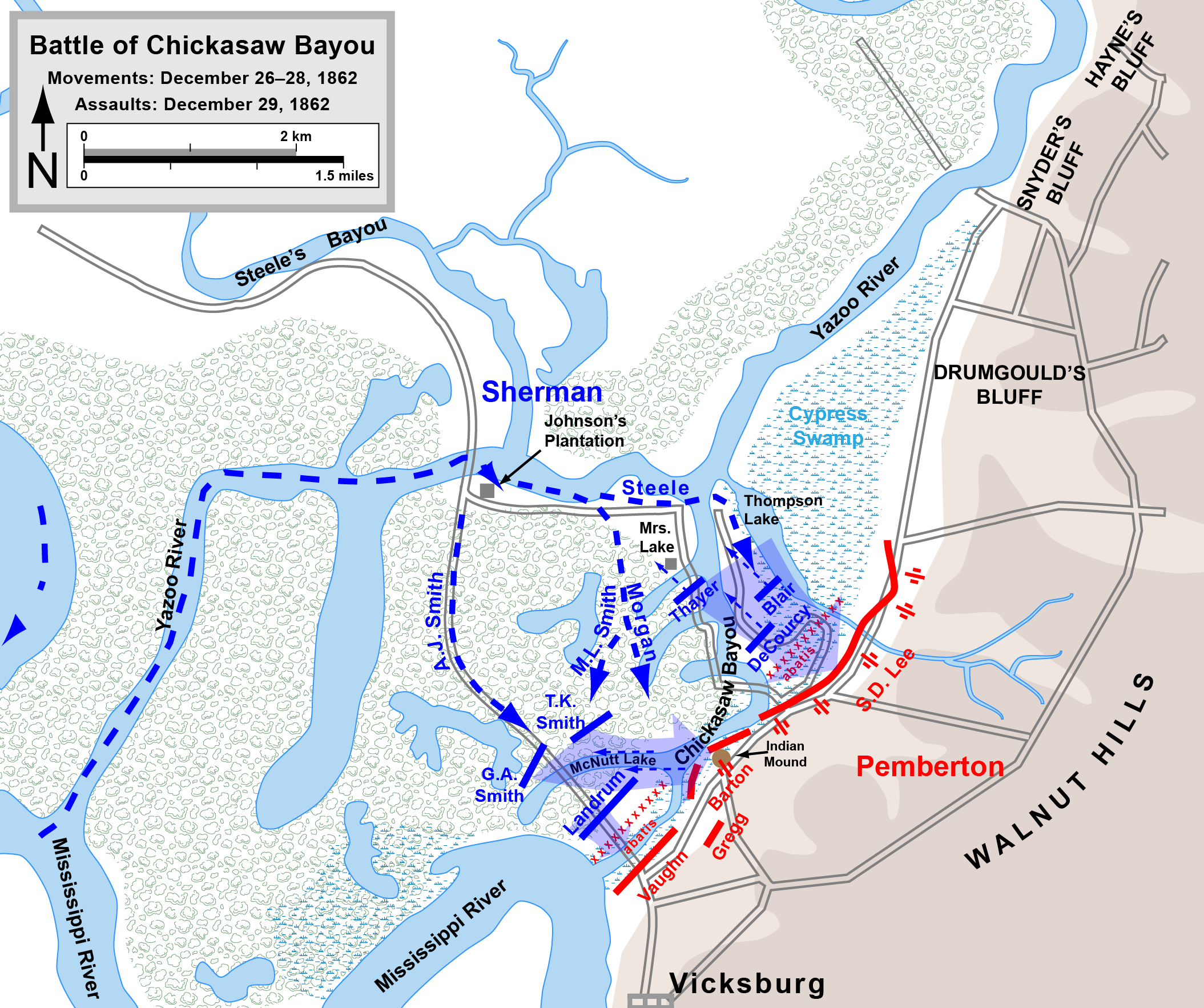
Battle of Chickasaw Bayou.

At noon, Union troops advanced with a cheer. Blair's brigade moved on the left, DeCourcy's in the center, followed by Brig. Gen. John M. Thayer's brigade on the right; all of Thayer's brigade except the 4th Iowa Infantry was ordered not to follow Thayer's orders by General George W. Morgan (the order conveyed by General Steele who was officially Thayer's superior.) Thus, instead of arriving before the Confederate lines with 3500 men, Thayer found himself with 500. Colonel James A. Williamson, commanding the 4th Iowa, was later awarded the Medal of Honor for his actions that day. They crossed water barriers and abatis and carried the advance rifle pits on the weight of sheer numbers, but met stiff resistance when they came against the main Confederate line and began to crumble under the heavy fire. The survivors fell back across the bayou on a corduroy bridge. S.D. Lee ordered his men to make a counterattack, during which they captured 332 Union soldiers and four battle flags.

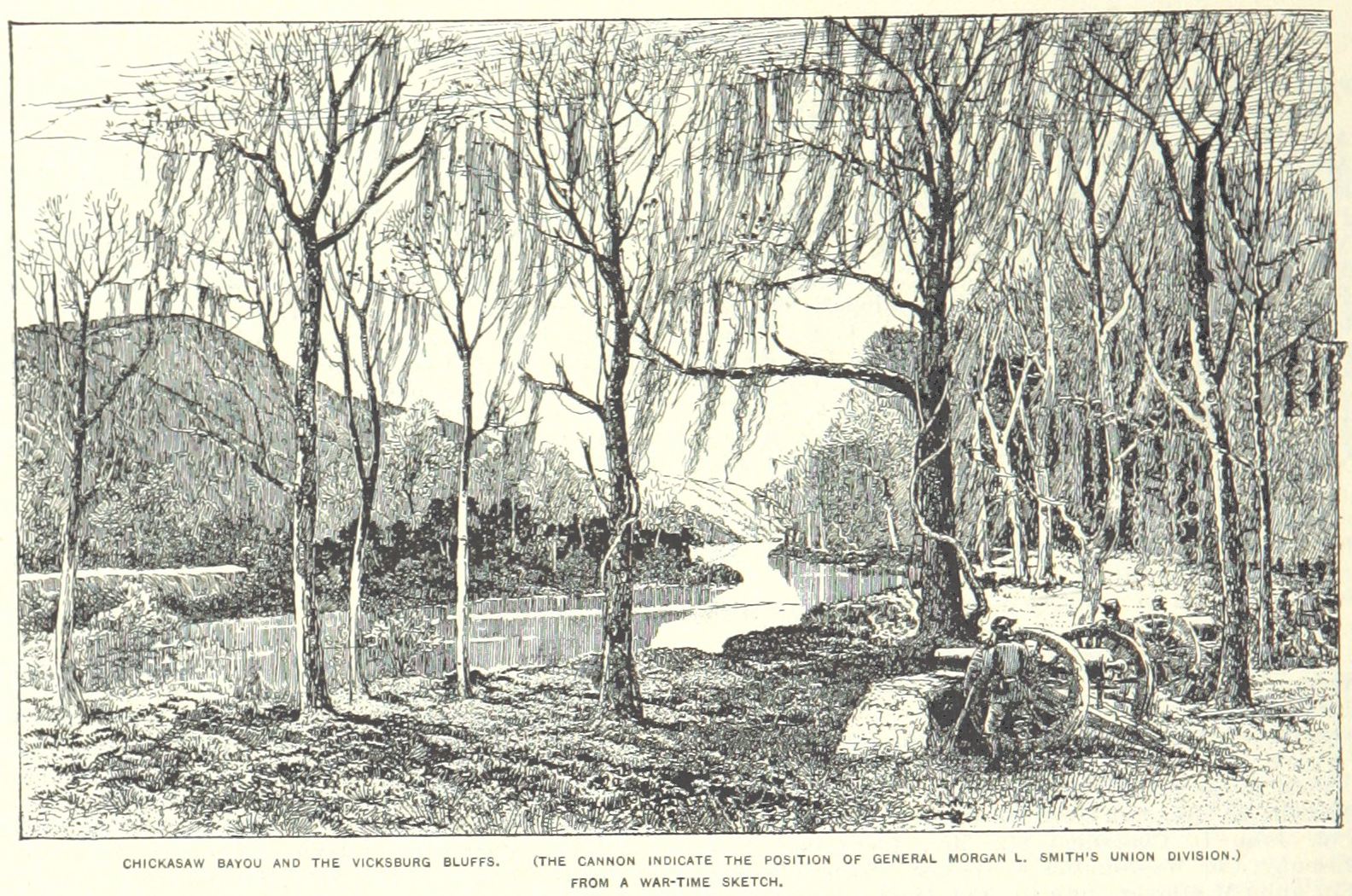
The Chickasaw bluffs as seen from General M. L. Smith's position

Another assault ordered by Sherman was conducted by two divisions under A. J. Smith (his own division and that of M. L. Smith, who had been wounded the day before) advancing across Chickasaw Bayou to seize the Indian Mound that was in the center of the Confederate line, defended by Barton and Gregg. Skirmishers from the brigades of Cols. Giles A. Smith and Thomas Kilby Smith covered the bayou crossing and the 6th Missouri Infantry of G. A. Smith's brigade led the way with 20 pioneers, building a road on the far bank. Five attempts to carry the position at the Indian mound were repulsed.

On the far Union right, an attack by Col. William J. Landram's brigade of A.J. Smith's division was easily repulsed by the Confederates of Vaughn's brigade.

== Aftermath ==
That evening, Sherman declared that he was "generally satisfied with the high spirit manifested" by his men although their attacks had failed in the face of strong Confederate positions on the high bluffs. The battle was a lopsided victory for the Confederates: Union casualties were 208 killed, 1,005 wounded, and 563 captured or missing, the majority among the 4th Iowa and the brigades of Blair and De Courcy. Confederate casualties were light at 57 killed, 120 wounded, and 10 missing. Sherman conferred with Adm. Porter, whose naval gunfire had also failed to do any significant damage to the enemy. They decided to resume the attacks on the following day and Porter sent a boat to Memphis to get more small arms ammunition.

By the morning of December 30, Sherman had concluded that resuming the attacks at the same location would be fruitless and he and Porter planned a joint army-navy attack on Drumgould's Bluff to the northeast, hoping that the steep bluffs would provide cover for his men as they advanced. It was imperative that such a movement be started in secrecy so that the Confederates would not shift their defensive forces. The movement commenced on December 31, but was called off in heavy fog on January 1, 1863.

During this period, the overland half of Grant's offensive was also failing. His lines of communication were disrupted by raids by Brig. Gen. Nathan Bedford Forrest and by Maj. Gen. Earl Van Dorn, who destroyed a large supply depot in the Holly Springs Raid on December 20. Unable to sustain his army without these supplies, Grant abandoned his overland advance. Sherman realized that his corps would not be reinforced by Grant and decided to withdraw his expedition, moving to the mouth of the Yazoo on January 2. On January 5, Sherman sent a letter to General-in-Chief Henry W. Halleck, summing up the campaign (in a manner reminiscent of a famous statement by Julius Caesar), "I reached Vicksburg at the time appointed, landed, assaulted, and failed." He and his command were then temporarily assigned to Maj. Gen. John A. McClernand for an expedition up the Arkansas River and the Battle of Arkansas Post. Although Grant tried a number of operations, or "experiments", to reach Vicksburg over the winter, the Vicksburg Campaign did not begin again in earnest until April 1863.

== Battlefield Preservation ==
The American Battlefield Trust and its partners acquired and preserved more than three acres of the battlefield in 2022. The Trust added almost four more acres with two additional acquisitions in 2023 for a total of 7.03 acres saved.

== See also ==
- Troop engagements of the American Civil War, 1862
- List of costliest American Civil War land battles
