= Jacob Swegheimer =

Private Jacob Swegheimer
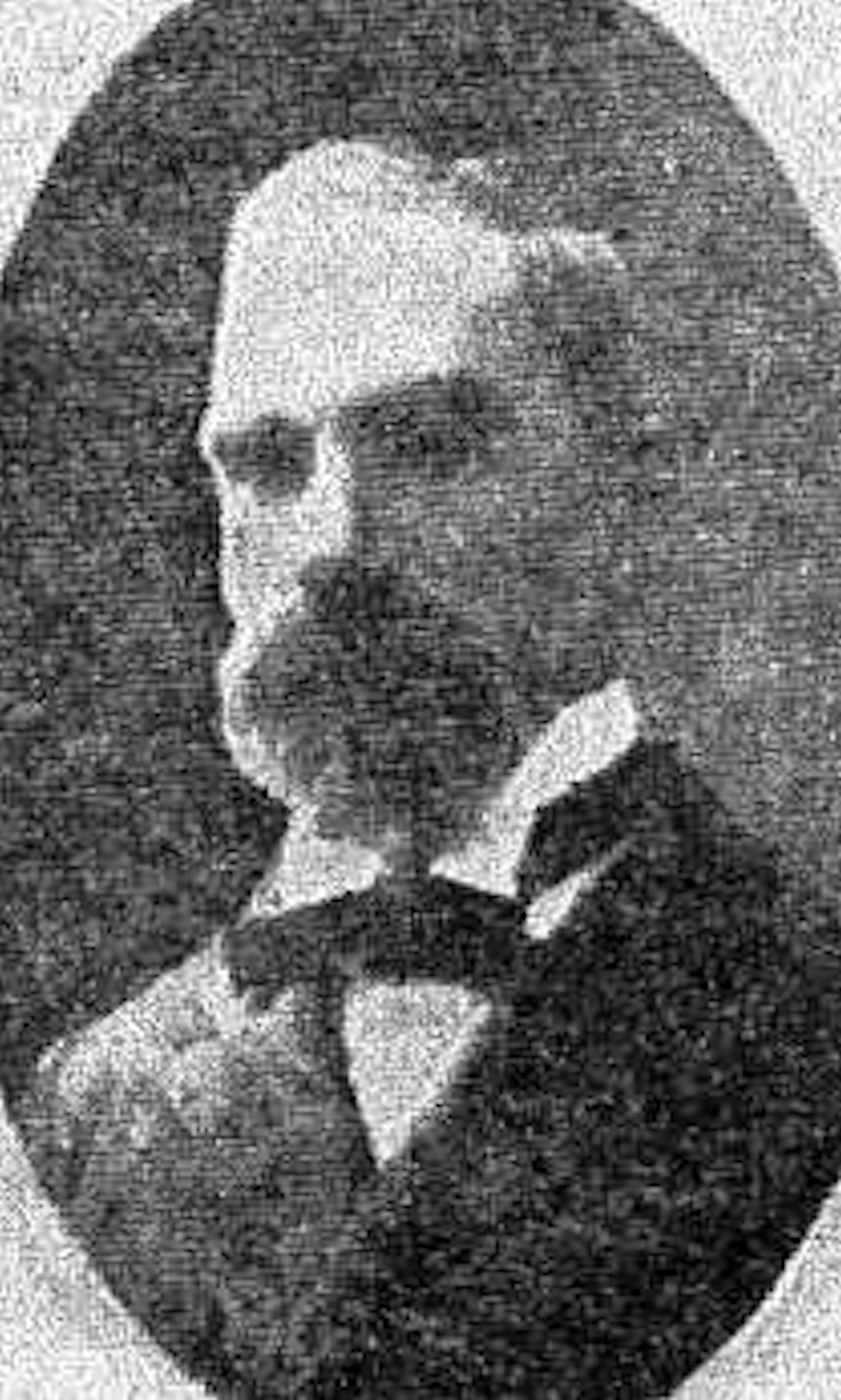
- Born: John Swegheimer; 25 February 1843; Kingdom of Württemberg (modern day Baden-Württemberg, Germany)
- Died: 15 March 1917 (aged 74); Delaware, Ohio
- Burial place: Oak Grove Cemetery, Delaware, Ohio
- Military career
- Allegiance: United States (Union)
- Branch: Army
- Rank: Private
- Units: Company I, 54th Ohio Infantry
- Conflicts: Siege of Vicksburg
- Awards: Medal of Honor

Jacob Swegheimer (also listed as John Swegheimer, 25 February 1843 - 15 March 1917) was a private in the United States Army who was awarded the Medal of Honor for gallantry during the American Civil War. He was awarded the medal on 14 July 1894 for actions performed on 22 May 1863 during the Battle of Vicksburg.

== Personal life ==
Swegheimer was born as John Swegheimer in the Kingdom of Württemberg (modern day Baden-Württemberg, Germany) on 25 February 1843. He married Anna Basiger and fathered nine children, of which one lived until 1979. Swegheimer died on 15 March 1917 in Delaware, Ohio and was buried in Oak Grove Cemetery in the town of Delaware.

== Military service ==
Swegheimer enlisted in the Army as a private at the age of 19 at Paducah, Kentucky on 1 March 1862. He was assigned to Company I of the 54th Ohio Infantry. On 22 May 1863, during the Siege of Vicksburg, he participated in a volunteer storming charge, an action that earned him the Medal of Honor.

Swegheimer's Medal of Honor citation reads:

The President of the United States of America, in the name of Congress, takes pleasure in presenting the Medal of Honor to Private Jacob Swegheimer, United States Army, for gallantry in the charge of the volunteer storming party on 22 May 1863, while serving with Company I, 54th Ohio Infantry, in action at Vicksburg, Mississippi.

— D. S. Lamont, Secretary of War

Swegheimer was mustered out of service on 27 March 1865 at Goldsboro, North Carolina. His Medal of Honor is accredited to Kentucky.
