= Haydon L. Boatner =

United States Army general (1900–1977)

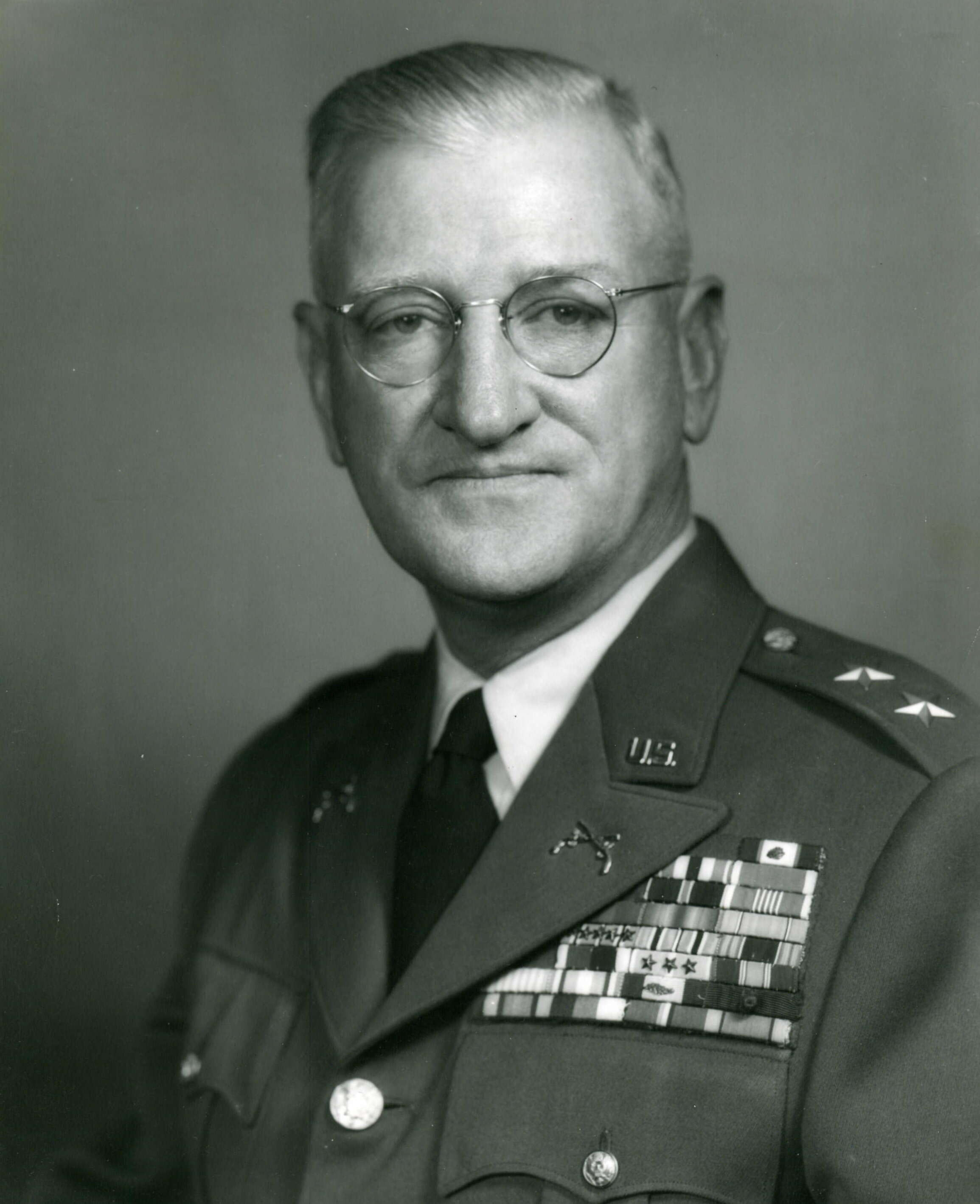
- Born: October 8, 1900; New Orleans, Louisiana, US
- Died: May 29, 1977 (aged 76)
- Burial place: Arlington National Cemetery
- Relatives: Mark M. Boatner III (nephew)
- Military career
- Branch: United States Army
- Service years: 1924–1960
- Rank: Major general
- Service number: 0-15641
- Conflicts: World War II; Korean War
- Awards: Army Distinguished Service Medal; Silver Star; Bronze Star; Legion of Merit

Haydon LeMaire Boatner (October 8, 1900 – May 29, 1977) was a major general in the United States Army who served in World War II and the Korean War.

== Early life and family ==
Haydon L. Boatner was born and raised in New Orleans, Louisiana. His father, Mark Mayo Boatner, graduated from Virginia Military Institute and was a respected lawyer and judge in New Orleans. His mother's maiden name was Byrd Elizabeth Bryant. He was one of six children: Mark II, Frank, Haydon, Bryant (who became an Air Force Lieutenant general, Charlotte and Elizabeth (Betty). He enlisted in the United States Marine Corps near the end of World War I but did not complete training in time to deploy.

== Education ==
From 1919 to 1920 he attended Tulane University, in New Orleans. In 1920, he received an appointment to the United States Military Academy at West Point, New York.

== Military career ==
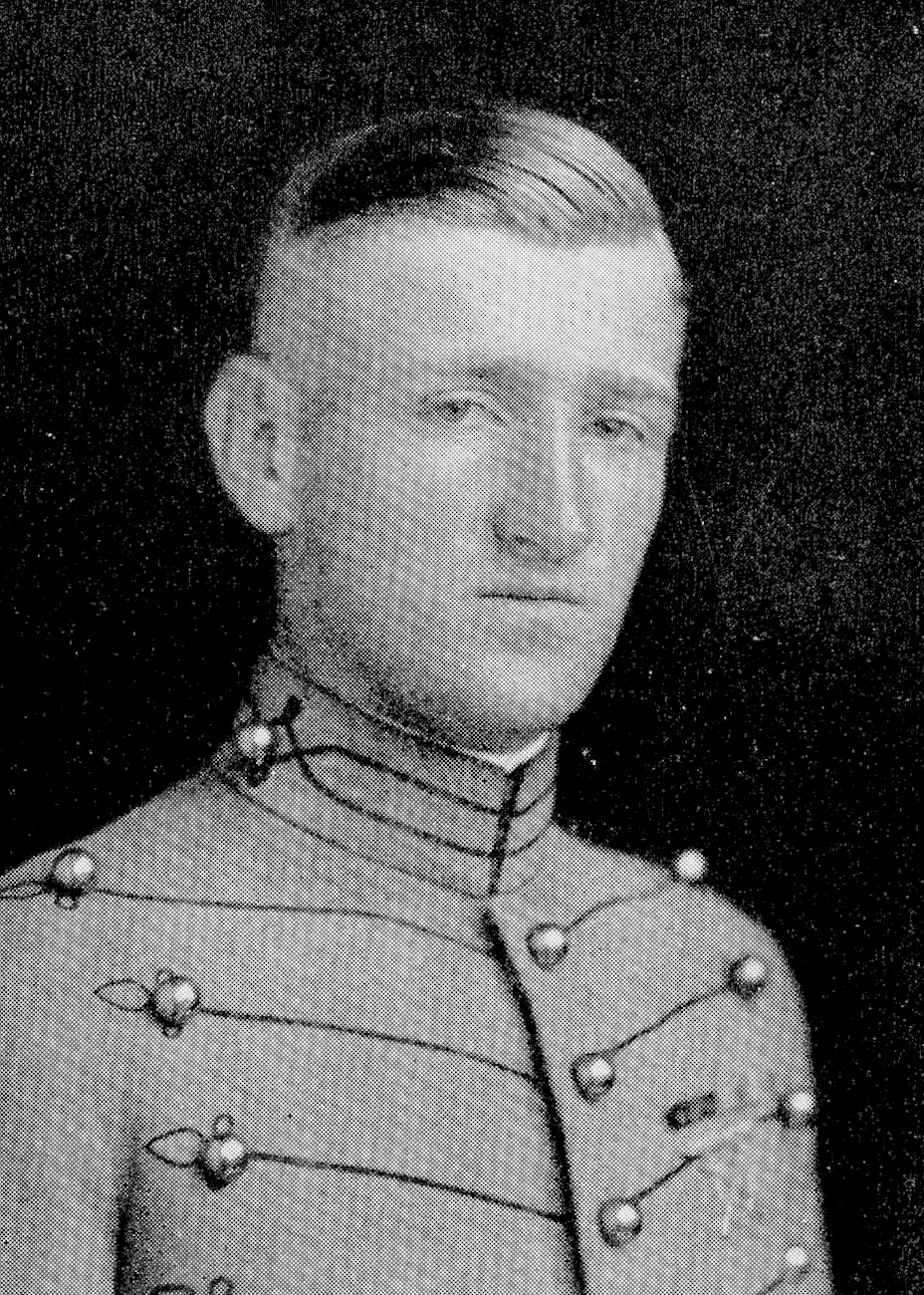
At West Point in 1924

He was commissioned in the infantry from West Point in 1924.

His first assignment was with the 29th Infantry at Fort Benning, Georgia. From 1928 to 1930, he served with the 15th Infantry in Tianjin (Tientsin), China. From 1930 to 1934 he served as assistant military attaché at the American Embassy, Peking, and during this time he became fluent in Mandarin Chinese.

He graduated from Command and General Staff School in 1939. He was appointed as commanding officer of the forward echelon in Burma in 1942 and was promoted to brigadier general in November 1942. He was subsequently chief of staff of the Chinese Army in Burma from 1942 to 1943. He was commanding general of combat troops in northwest Burma from 1943 to 1944 and chief of staff of Chinese Combat Command from 1944 to 1945.

From 1948 to 1951 he was professor of military science and tactics and commandant of cadets at A&M College of Texas.

During the Korean War Brigadier General Boatner served as assistant division commander of the 2nd Infantry Division. In May 1952, General Mark W. Clark, commanding general of the Eighth Army, appointed Boatner to take command of the Koje-do POW Camp and suppress the uprising by Communist POWs. Boatner swiftly took control of the situation at Koje-do, and by June 1952 the camp had been pacified. He was subsequently promoted to Major General.

His assignments after the Korean War included commanding general of the 3rd Infantry Division from December 1954 until October 1955 and Provost Marshal General of the U.S. Army from 19 November 1957 until 31 October 1960.

MG Boatner retired from the army in November 1960.

== Death ==
He was buried at Arlington National Cemetery.

== Bibliography ==
- Fehrenbach, T. R., This Kind of War: A Study In Unpreparedness 1963, LCCN 63-9972. Republished in 1998 as This Kind Of War: The Classic Korean War History ISBN 1-57488-161-2, LCCN 98-27350.
