= Oscar Malmborg =

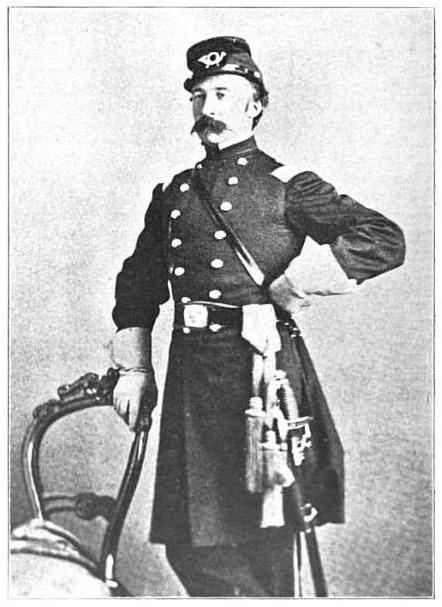
Col. Oscar Malmborg in military dress

Frans Oscar Malmborg (February 29, 1820 – April 29, 1880), a veteran of the Mexican War, became famous for his ostentatious manner in training recruits for the American Civil War, primarily the 55th Illinois Volunteer Infantry Regiment in which he served.

== Background ==
Malmborg was born at the Rågåkra farm in Kräklingbo parish on the Baltic Sea island of Gotland in Sweden. He was the son of Captain Pehr Gustaf Malmborg (1777–1828), who had been decorated with the gold medal for bravery after the Battle of Svensksund in 1790, before he was teenager. Oscar Malmborg emigrated to the United States in 1846 and fought in the Mexican War.

== Career ==
From 1853 to 1861 he worked as an immigration agent for the Illinois Central Railroad. He returned to Europe to promote emigration to America.

President Abraham Lincoln formally recognized Malmborg as the vice consul of Norway and Sweden at Chicago on November 22, 1861. The same year he returned to military service and was appointed as a lieutenant colonel in the Union Army.

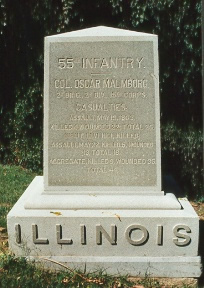
Monument to Col. Oscar Malmborg and those in the 55th Illinois Infantry who died at Vicksburg National Military Park

During the Battle of Shiloh after Colonel David Stuart was badly wounded, Malmborg assumed temporary command of the Second Brigade of the Fifth Division commanded by Brigadier General William T. Sherman. In the advance on Corinth, Mississippi, Malmborg correctly predicted what the Confederate forces were attempting. In an official report on April 10, 1862, Colonel Stuart wrote of Malmborg, "He instantly perceived the aim of every movement made by the enemy; he could advise me quickly and prudently how to use my men. He was intent, careful, brave, and immensely valuable to me." General Ulysses S. Grant took notice and complimented him.

After Stuart resigned on April 3, 1863, Malmborg became the permanent commander until being relieved. He resigned on September 20, 1864. On January 1, 1865, Malmborg was commissioned a colonel in the First Veteran Army Corps under General Winfield Scott Hancock and was ordered to oversee the recruiting in Illinois, with headquarters in Chicago once again. He resigned from this position on May 31, 1865.

== Later years ==
Encouraged by Sherman, Malmborg published his memoirs of the Civil War. He chose the title Tjensteförteckning, and it was published in Chicago in 1871. Almost blind, Malmborg returned to Sweden in 1874 and settled in Visby on Gotland living on his pension. Some of his letters have been edited and published by A. A. Stomberg. He died in Visby on April 29, 1880, at the age of 60.

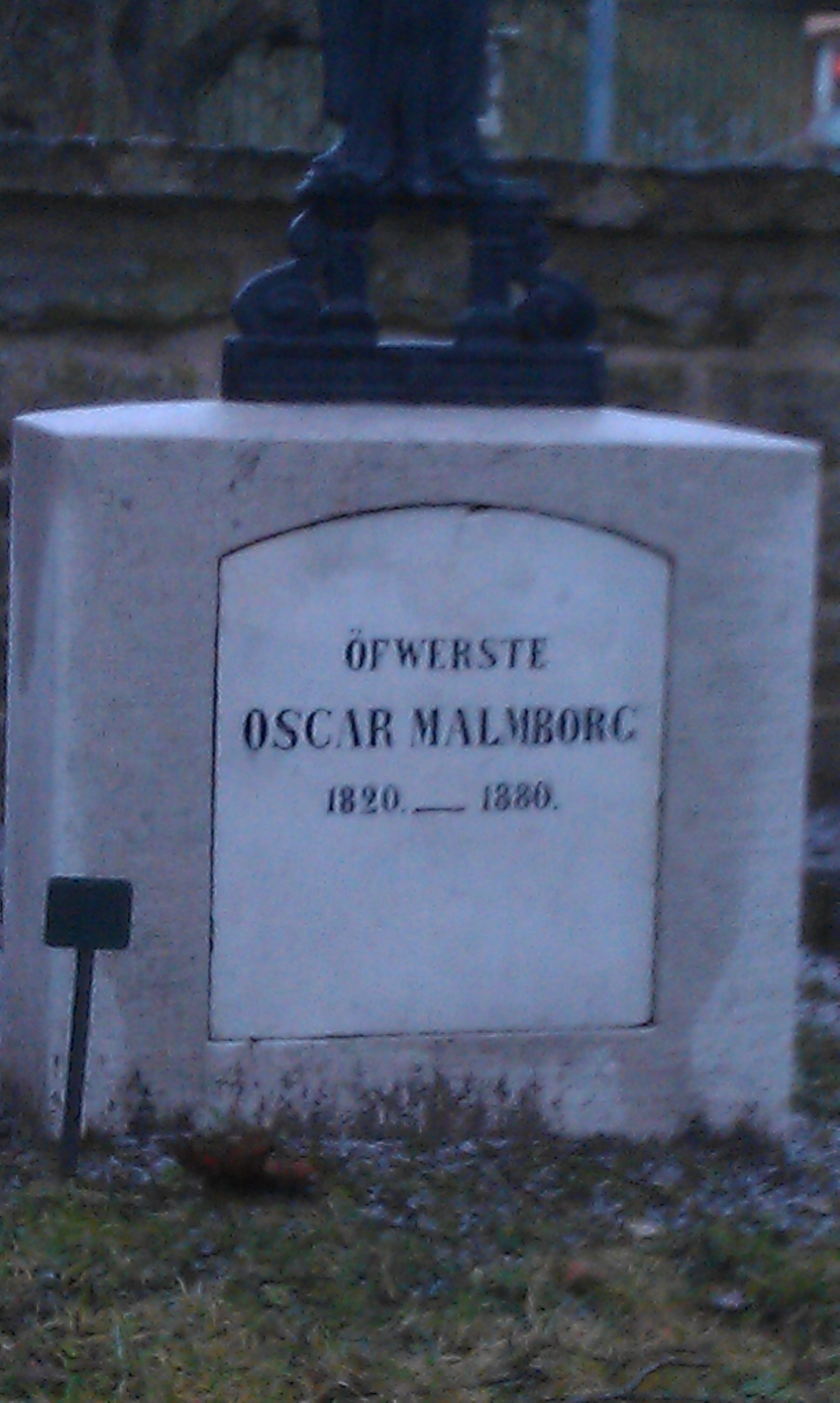
Oscar Malmborg's grave in Visby, Sweden

== Other sources ==
- Olson, Ernst W. The Swedish Element In Illinois (Chicago: Swedish-American Biographical Association. 1917)
- Olson, Ernst W. and Martin J. Engberg History of the Swedes of Illinois (Chicago: Engberg-Holmberg Publishing Company. 1908)
