= Snake Creek (Tennessee River tributary) =

Stream in Tennessee, United States

Coordinates: 35.159805°N 88.318096°W

Snake Creek is a stream in the U.S. state of Tennessee. It is a tributary to the Tennessee River.

Snake Creek was named for its serpentine meanders.
