= Joseph Boatner =

American singer

- Born: September 27, 1918; Belmont, New Hampshire, US
- Died: May 8, 1989 (aged 70); Laconia, New Hampshire, US
- Occupation: Singer

Joseph Boatner (September 27, 1918 – May 8, 1989) was an American singer who gained some recognition in the 1950s–1960s for his forming a vocal group calling themselves "The Ink Spots". None of the members in the group ever sang with The Ink Spots however his group recorded a few records and had a cameo role in the 1965 "All Men Are Apes". Boatner led various groups using the "Ink Spots" name until the 1980s.

Boatner died on May 8, 1989, at the age of 70 at the Lakes Region General Hospital in Laconia, New Hampshire.
