= Thomas Kilby Smith =

American lawyer (1820–1887)

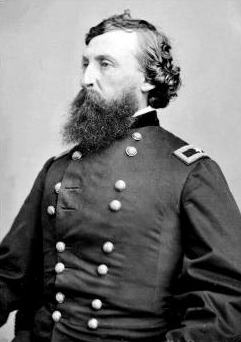
- Born: September 23, 1820; Boston, Massachusetts, US
- Died: December 14, 1887 (aged 67); New York City, US
- Military career
- Allegiance: United States; Union
- Branch: United States Army; Union Army
- Service years: 1861–1865
- Rank: Brigadier General; Bvt. Major General
- Commands: 54th Ohio Infantry; 2nd Division, XVII Corps
- Conflicts: Battle of Shiloh; Siege of Corinth; Vicksburg Campaign; Red River Campaign
- Other work: Diplomat, journalist

Thomas Kilby Smith (September 23, 1820 – December 14, 1887) was a lawyer, soldier, and diplomat from the state of Ohio who served as a general in the Union Army during the American Civil War and then in the reconstruction era United States Army. He led a brigade and then a division in the Army of the Tennessee in several of the most significant campaigns of the Western Theater of operations before failing health forced him to a series of desk jobs.

== Early life and career ==
Smith was born in Boston, Massachusetts, on September 23, 1820. He was the eldest son of Captain George Smith and Eliza Bicker Walter. Both his paternal and maternal forefathers were active and prominent in the professional life and in the government of New England.

His parents moved to Cincinnati, Ohio, in his early childhood, where he was educated in a military school under Ormsby M. Mitchel, the astronomer, and studied law in the office of Chief Justice Salmon P. Chase. In 1853 he was appointed by President Franklin Pierce as the special agent in the Post Office Department at Washington, D.C., and later United States Marshal for the Southern District of Ohio and deputy clerk of Hamilton County.

== Civil War ==
Smith entered the Union Army on September 9, 1861, as a lieutenant colonel. Later in the year, he was commissioned as the colonel of the newly raised 54th Ohio Infantry. He organized the regiment at Camp Dennison near Cincinnati in the summer and fall of 1861. In February 1862, Smith and his men were ordered to Paducah, Kentucky, where they joined the division of Maj. Gen. William T. Sherman.

He was conspicuous in the Battle of Shiloh, on April 6 and 7, 1862, assuming command of Stuart's Brigade, Sherman's Division, during the second day. As commander of a brigade in the XV and then in the XVII Army Corps, he participated in all the campaigns of the Army of the Tennessee; being also for some months on staff duty with General Ulysses S. Grant.

He was commissioned as a brigadier general of volunteers on August 11, 1863. Smith was assigned on March 7, 1864, to the command of the detached division of the XVII Army Corps and rendered distinguished service during the Red River Expedition, protecting Admiral David D. Porter's fleet after the disaster of the main army. During the Red River campaign, he ordered the destruction of the library and other items at Louisiana State University, but the building was spared at the request of Maj. Gen. William T. Sherman, the school's first superintendent. His health failed, and Smith was relieved of field duty on January 17, 1865. After the fall of Mobile, Alabama, he assumed the command of the Department of Southern Alabama and Florida, and then of the Post and District of Maine. He was brevetted as a major general for gallant and meritorious service.

== Postbellum career ==
After the war he removed to Torresdale, Philadelphia. In 1866 President Andrew Johnson appointed him as the United States Consul at Panama. He inventoried Julius H. Kroehl's personal belongings (the first successful deep diving submarine) when he died presumably by the bends in Panama. At the time of his death, he was engaged in journalism in New York City.

On May 2, 1848, he married Elizabeth Budd, daughter of Dr. William Budd McCullough and Arabella Sanders Piatt, of Cincinnati. She was a gifted and devout woman, and through her influence and that of the venerable archbishop Purcell he became a Catholic some years before his death. He left five sons and three daughters.

In 1911, a bronze bust of Smith by sculptor Louis Milione was dedicated in Vicksburg National Military Park. Smith's sons paid for the plaque and donated it to the park.

== 54th Ohio Infantry Monument ==
The monument is located in the Vicksburg National Military Park on Union Avenue approximately 150 yards south of Grant Avenue. Also a marker designating the assaults of May 19, 1863 located on the ridge on the south side of Graveyard Road 400' east of the Stockade Redan. This unit was attached to Col. Thomas Kilby Smith and Brig. Gen. Joseph Andrew Jackson Lightburn's (assumed command May 24, 1863) 2nd Brigade of Maj. Gen.Francis P. Blair's 2nd Division, Maj. Gen. William T. Sherman's XV Army Corps and was commanded by Lt. Col. Cyrus W. Fisher.

== See also ==
- List of American Civil War generals (Union)
- Surget family § Clifton house
