= Mark M. Boatner III =

American historian (1921–2006)

Mark Mayo Boatner III
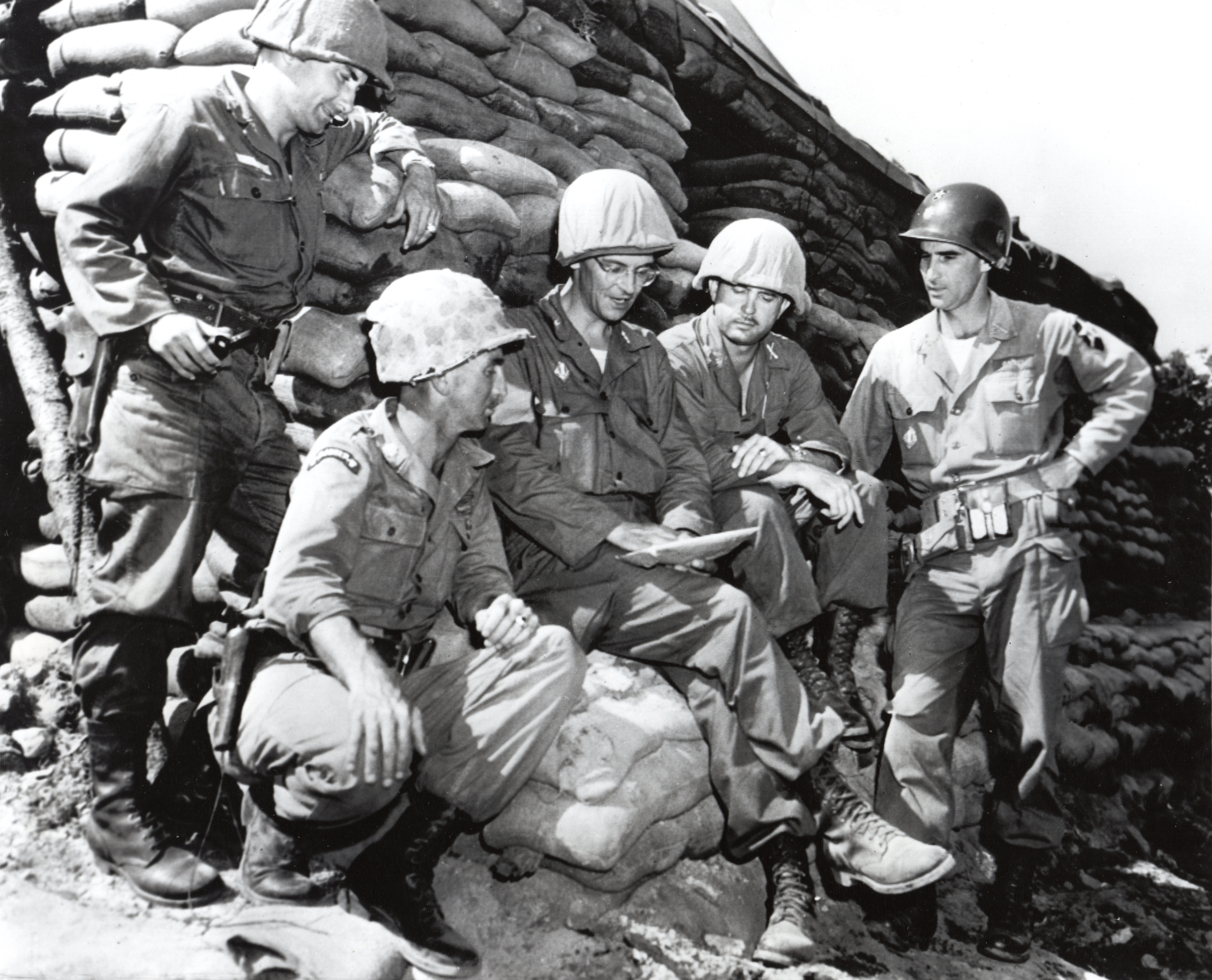
- Boatner (far left) in 1952
- Born: June 28, 1921; Louisiana
- Died: June 10, 2006 (aged 84)
- Occupations: Soldier, historian, author
- Children: 7
- Writing career
- Genre: Military History
- Notable works: The Civil War Dictionary (1959); Encyclopedia of the American Revolution (1966); Landmarks of the American Revolution (1973)

Mark Mayo Boatner III (June 28, 1921 – June 10, 2006) was an American colonel, historian, and author. He graduated from the United States Military Academy at West Point in the June 1943 class and fought in World War II and the Korean War. While teaching military history at West Point he wrote and published The Civil War Dictionary in 1959. The Encyclopedia of the American Revolution followed in 1966. Both works have had several revised editions published. He authored Landmarks of the American Revolution in 1973.

== Career ==
Boatner was born in 1921. His father was Mark Mayo Boatner Jr, who retired from the army in 1947.

Mark Mayo Boatner III went to the United States Military Academy at West Point and graduated in the June 1943 class. He served as a combat infantryman in Italy during World War II. He also saw active duty during the Korean War.

Married twice, he had one daughter and six sons. While he was serving in Korea, one of his sons died in an automobile accident. He was awarded the Combat Infantryman Badge and the Croix de Guerre for his war service.

In 1952 Boatner coauthored Battery Duties: A Ready Reference Manual for Battery Personnel with Robert F. Cocklin. He wrote Army Lore and the Customs of the Service in 1954. While an assistant professor of military history at West Point, he researched and wrote The Civil War Dictionary, which was published in 1959. The work was dedicated to his wife Patricia Dilworth Boatner. Soon after, he served at Supreme Headquarters Allied Powers Europe at Paris, France.

In 1966, Boatner published Encyclopedia of the American Revolution. Revised editions would be released in 1974 and 1994. The book was dedicated to his grandmother Emily Nelson Gunnell (1869–1969), who was the great-granddaughter of Thomas Nelson Jr., a signer of the United States Declaration of Independence.

Boatner wrote Landmarks of the American Revolution in 1973. During his career, he earned a master's degree in international affairs from the US Army War College and George Washington University. He retired from the army with the rank of colonel.
