= Catoosa =

Catoosa may refer to:

- Catoosa, Oklahoma
- Catoosa County, Georgia
- Catoosa County Schools, in Georgia
- Catoosa Springs, Georgia
- Catoosa High School
- Catoosa County Library
- Catoosa Blue Whale
- Catoosa Wildlife Management Area on the Upper Cumberland Plateau of Tennessee
