= Battle of Resaca =

1864 battle of the American Civil War

- Part of the Atlanta campaign
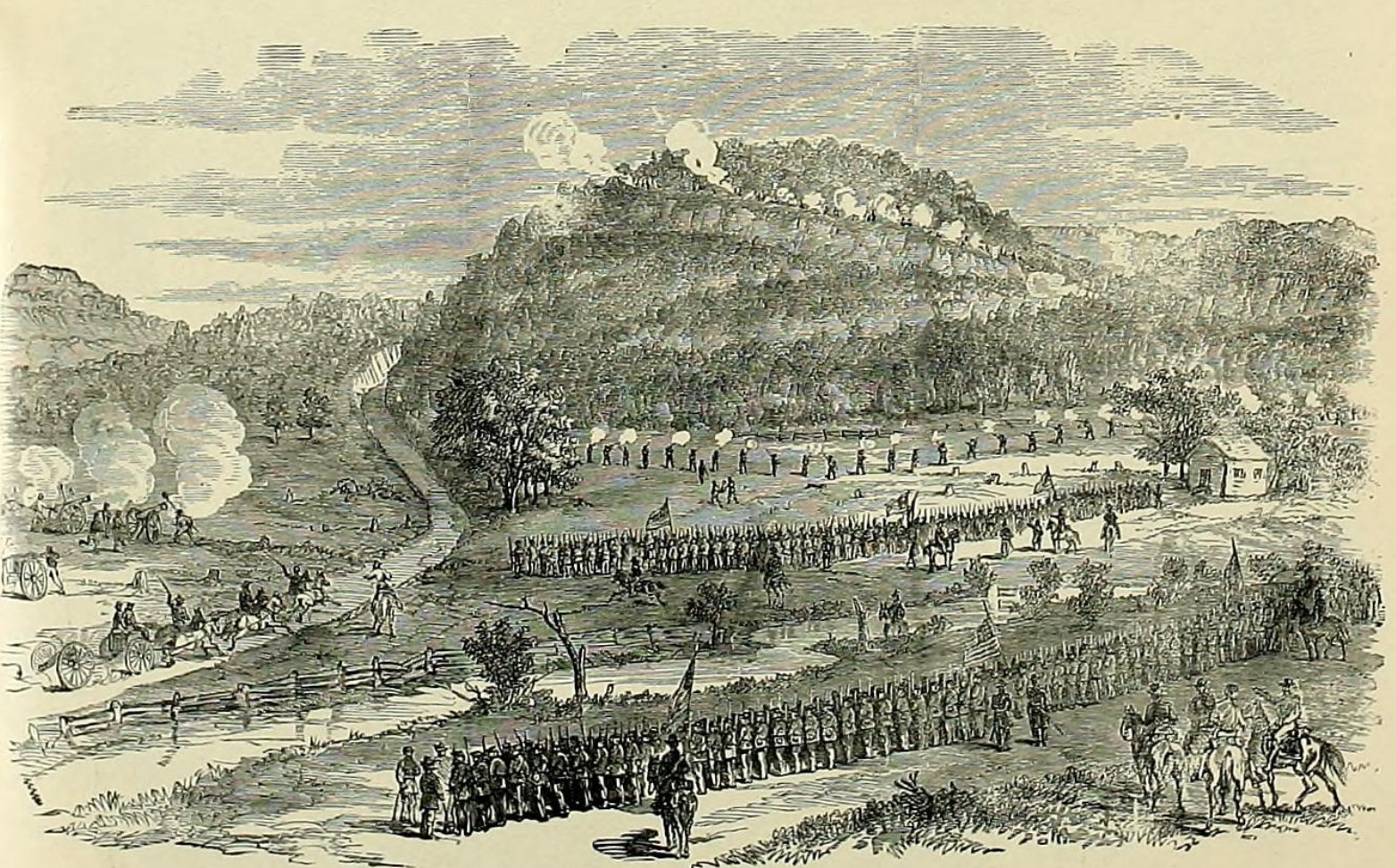
- Geary's Second Brigade attacking Confederate positions
Date	May 13–15, 1864 (2 days)
Location	Gordon County and Whitfield County, Georgia 34°34′53″N 84°56′19″W
Result	Union victory

Belligerents
United States (Union)	(Confederate States of America) CSA (Confederacy)

Commanders and leaders
(United States) William T. Sherman: George H. Thomas; James B. McPherson; John Schofield	(Confederate States of America) Joseph E. Johnston: William J. Hardee; John Bell Hood; Leonidas Polk

Units involved
Military Division of the Mississippi	Army of Tennessee

Strength
98,787–110,000	60,000–70,000

Casualties and losses
2,747–4,000	2,800–3,000, 4 guns

The Battle of Resaca, from May 13 to 15, 1864, formed part of the Atlanta campaign during the American Civil War, when a Union force under William Tecumseh Sherman engaged the Confederate Army of Tennessee led by Joseph E. Johnston. The battle was fought in Gordon and Whitfield counties, Georgia.

The campaign began with Johnston holding strong defensive positions at Buzzard's Roost Gap and Rocky Face Ridge, which he hoped Sherman would assault. He was compelled to abandon Dalton when the Union Army of the Tennessee under James B. McPherson seized the unguarded Snake Creek Gap on May 8, threatening Resaca from the west. Johnston retreated to Resaca where he was joined by reinforcements gathering there; he was pursued by Sherman, most of whose forces followed McPherson through Snake Creek Gap, while others came south down the Western and Atlantic Railroad.

On May 14, Sherman gained a foothold west of Resaca but an attack on Confederate defenses to the north and northwest was repulsed, as was an assault by Johnston on the Union left flank later the same day. On May 15, Sherman's attack to the north and a Confederate counterattack were both stopped, but other Union forces seized a bridgehead on the south bank of the Oostanaula River. With his line of retreat threatened, Johnston abandoned Resaca that night and retreated south to Adairsville, where there was a skirmish on May 17.

== Background ==
=== Union Army ===
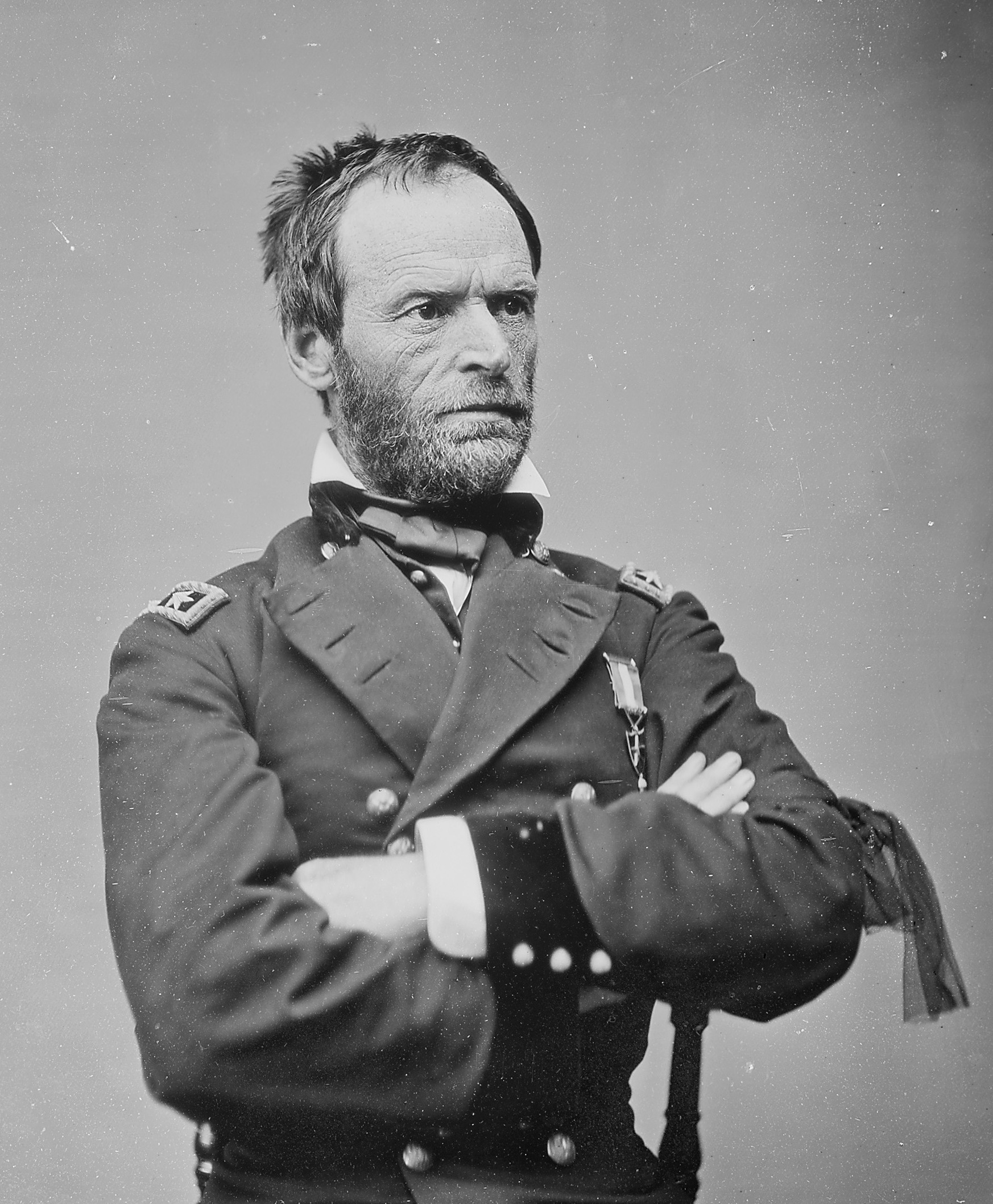
William T. Sherman

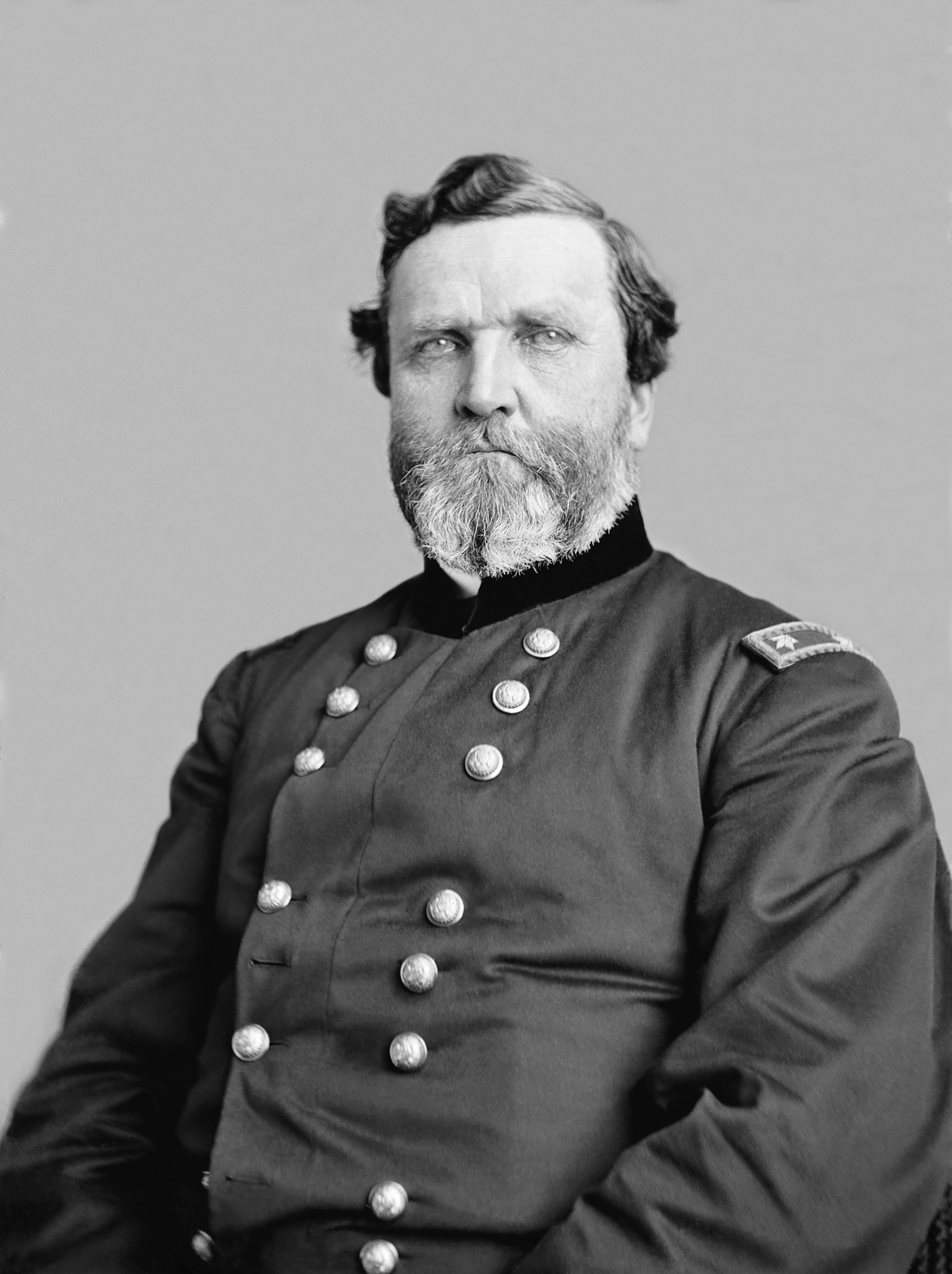
George H. Thomas, who in 1846 fought at the Battle of Resaca de la Palma, for which Resaca, Georgia was named

On April 30, Sherman commanded the Military Division of the Mississippi and gathered a field army numbering 110,000 soldiers of which 99,000 were available for "offensive purposes". All of the Union army's 254 guns consisted of 12-pounder Napoleons, 10-pounder Parrott rifles, 20-pounder Parrott rifles, and 3-inch Ordnance rifles. The 25,000 non-combatants accompanying the army included railroad employees and repair crews, teamsters, medical staff, and Black camp servants. Sherman directed elements of three armies.

According to Jacob Dolson Cox, the Army of the Cumberland led by George H. Thomas mustered 60,000 troops and 130 guns, the Army of the Tennessee under James B. McPherson counted 25,000 soldiers and 96 guns, and the Army of the Ohio commanded by John Schofield numbered 14,000 men and 28 guns.

Mark M. Boatner III credited Thomas' army with 63,000, McPherson's army with 24,000, and Schofield's army with 13,500. On May 1, Sherman had 88,188 infantry, 4,460 artillery, and 6,149 cavalry, or an effective strength of 98,797 men. According to Kevin W. Young, Sherman had 110,000 troops.

Thomas' army was made up of the IV Corps under Oliver Otis Howard, the XIV Corps under John M. Palmer, the XX Corps under Joseph Hooker, and three cavalry divisions led by Edward M. McCook, Kenner Garrard, and Hugh Judson Kilpatrick. McPherson's army consisted of the XV Corps under John A. Logan and the Left Wing of the XVI Corps under Grenville M. Dodge. The XVII Corps under Francis Preston Blair Jr. would not join until June 8. Schofield's army was made up of the XXIII Corps under Schofield and a cavalry division led by George Stoneman. The IV and XX Corps each numbered 20,000 soldiers, the XIV Corps totaled 22,000, the XV Corps had 11,500, while the XVI and XVII Corps each counted about 10,000 men.

=== Confederate Army ===
Johnston's Army of Tennessee included two infantry corps led by William J. Hardee and John Bell Hood, and a cavalry corps under Joseph Wheeler. The army was soon joined by the corps of Leonidas Polk and the cavalry division of William H. Jackson, which was sometimes called the Army of Mississippi. Hardee's corps included the divisions of Benjamin F. Cheatham, Patrick Cleburne, William H. T. Walker, and William B. Bate. Hood's corps comprised the divisions of Thomas C. Hindman, Carter L. Stevenson, and Alexander P. Stewart. Polk's corps consisted of the divisions of William Wing Loring, Samuel Gibbs French, and James Cantey.

On April 30, Johnston's Army of Tennessee reported 41,279 infantry, 8,436 cavalry, and 3,227 artillerymen serving 144 guns. Battles and Leaders calculated Johnston's reinforcements as follows: Hugh W. Mercer's brigade (2,800) from the Atlantic coast on May 2, Cantey's division (5,300) from Mobile, Alabama on May 7, Loring's division (5,145) from Mississippi on May 10–12, French's detachment (550) on May 12, Jackson's cavalry (4,477) on May 17, and French's division (4,174) on May 19. Other units arrived at a later date. There were about 8,000 non-combatants supporting the army, many of whom were men unfit for combat.

According to Young, Johnston had "almost 70,000" troops after Polk's corps joined. The American Battlefield Trust credited Johnston with 60,000 men at Resaca.

=== Strategy ===
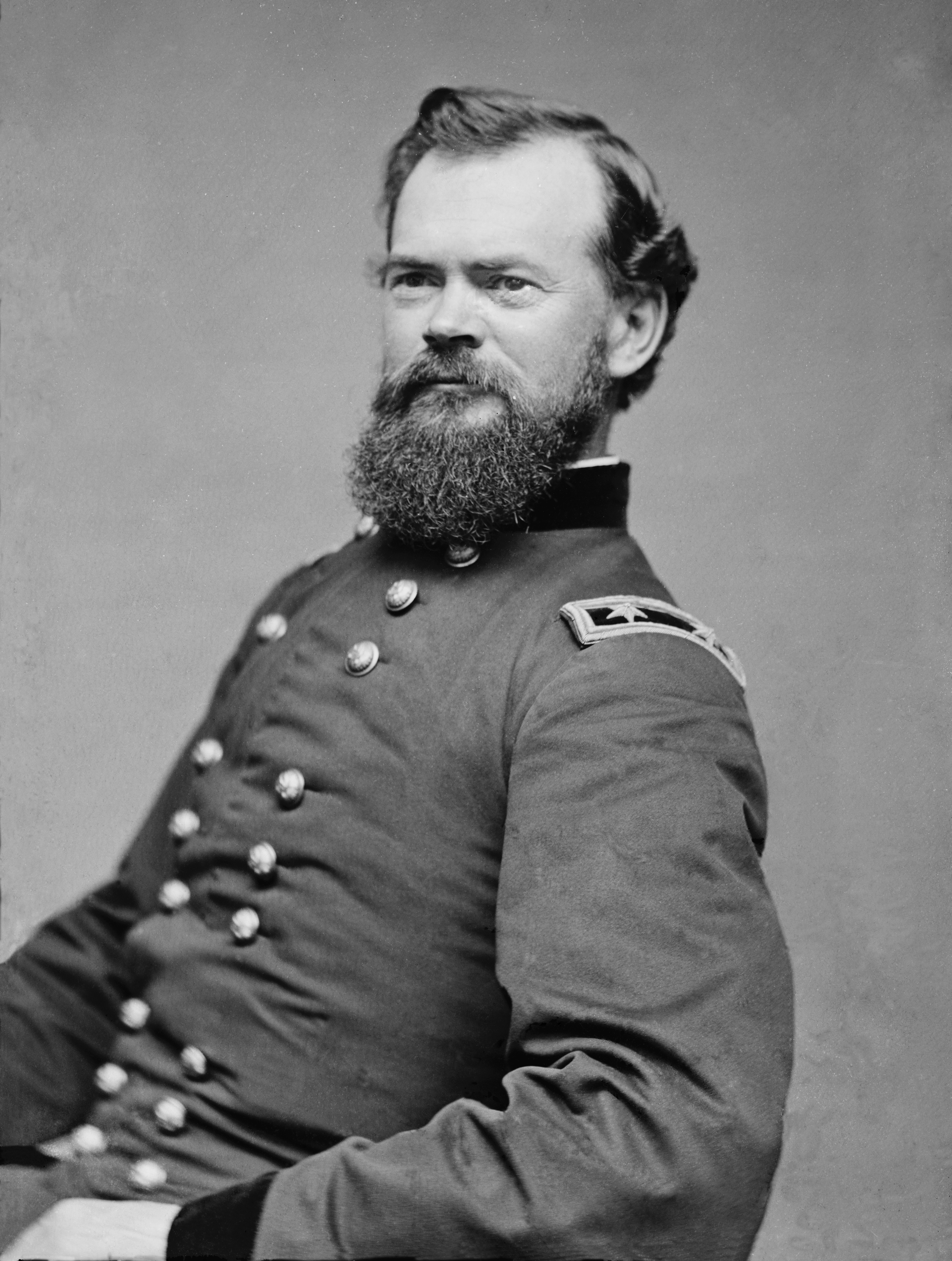
James B. McPherson

Ulysses S. Grant, the General-in-chief of the Union Army ordered Sherman, "to move against Johnston's army, to break it up, and to get into the interior of the enemy's country as far as you can, inflicting all the damage you can against their war resources". Rather than "break up" the Confederate army, Sherman planned to drive it back to Atlanta. Since Atlanta was a critical Confederate railroad, supply, and manufacturing center, Sherman chose it as his objective. Sherman assumed that Grant's operations against Robert E. Lee in the Eastern Theater would be the primary campaign and that his operations in the Western Theater would be secondary. One thing both Grant and Sherman agreed on was that Johnston must not be allowed to reinforce Lee in the east.

Sherman's first task was to gather enough supplies at his Chattanooga forward base to supply 100,000 soldiers and 35,000 horses for 70 days. That way, if the Confederates blocked the railroad between Nashville and Chattanooga, his Union troops would still be able to campaign. Sherman solved this problem by confiscating rolling stock from the Louisville and Nashville Railroad and two smaller railroads. By also prioritizing military use of the railroads, Sherman accumulated ample supplies by the end of April 1864. The Western and Atlantic Railroad connected Chattanooga with Atlanta and also supplied Johnston's army at Dalton. Sherman's 2,000-man railroad repair organization was led by William Wierman Wright.

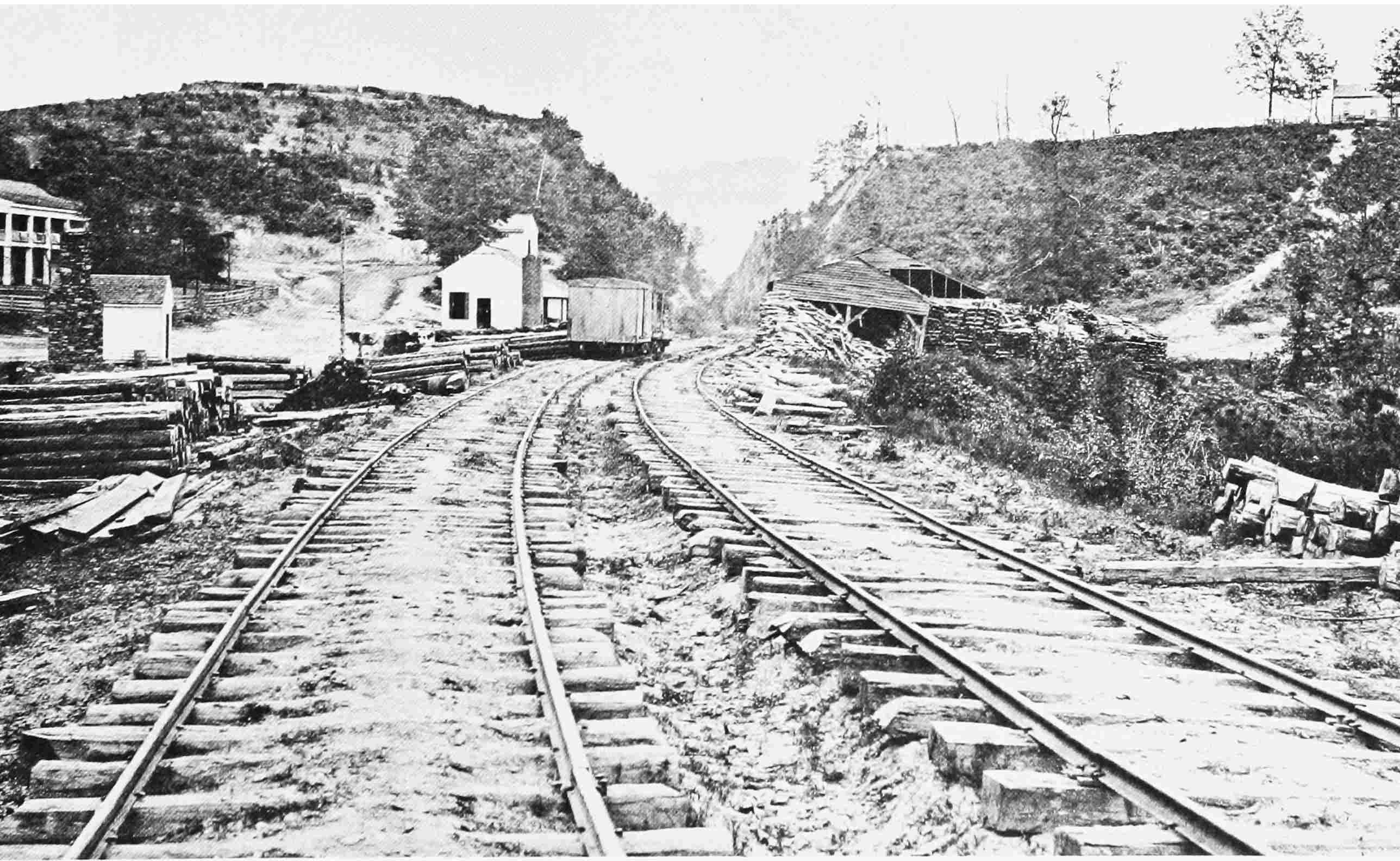
Western and Atlantic Railroad at Allatoona Pass during the Civil War

Originally, Sherman planned to have McPherson's army thrust across the northeast corner of Alabama in the direction of Rome, Georgia. However, he found that the XVII Corps was still at Cairo, Illinois and Andrew Jackson Smith's two divisions also could not be used. Therefore, Sherman planned to use McPherson's 23,000 men to execute a plan proposed by Thomas, namely to march through Snake Creek Gap and wreck the Western and Atlantic Railroad at Resaca. Then Sherman wanted McPherson to withdraw to the gap. Meanwhile, Sherman wanted the armies of Thomas and Schofield to push the Confederate army frontally. With the railroad cut, Sherman expected Johnston to retreat, whereupon McPherson would emerge from the gap again to strike Johnston from the west while Thomas and Schofield attacked from the north.

In early April, the Confederate government in Richmond, Virginia wanted Johnston to take the offensive against the Union troops opposed to him. Johnston asked for reinforcements, but Confederate President Jefferson Davis declined. Davis expected the main Union offensive to be in the east and believed that the Union army did not have the strength to mount major offensives in both east and west. When Wheeler reported with near-accuracy that Sherman had 103,000 soldiers, Davis and his military adviser Braxton Bragg refused to believe it. Bragg asserted that Sherman had no more than 70,000, including a field force of 60,000. Davis did not trust Johnston, but felt that he could not replace him on the eve of the campaign.

=== Operations ===
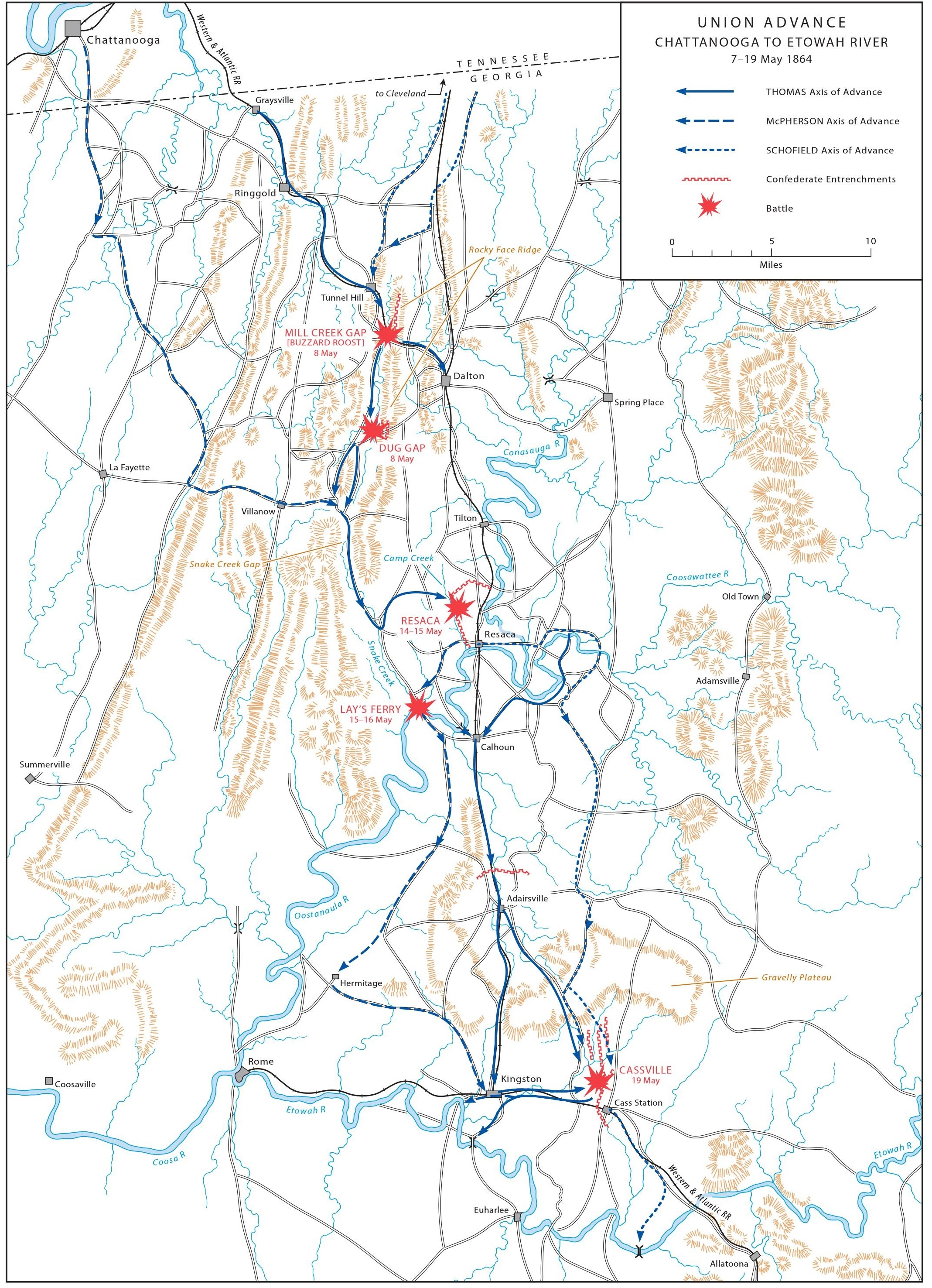
Movement of Sherman's forces to Resaca (center).

When Jefferson Davis awoke to the danger Sherman posed to Georgia, he authorized Polk to send Loring's division from Mississippi and an infantry brigade from Mobile. Polk exceeded his orders by ordering French's division and Jackson's cavalry to move from Mississippi to Georgia and by going there himself. By May 3, Sherman's forces were in motion. On May 7, Palmer's XIV Corps marched southeast from Ringgold to Tunnel Hill, Howard's IV Corps marched from Catoosa Springs to support the XIV Corps, and Hooker's XX Corps marched southeast from Lee and Gordon Mill toward Mill Creek Gap in Rocky Face Ridge. Schofield's XXIII Corps marched southwest from Red Clay to connect with the IV Corps near Catoosa Springs. McCook's cavalry was at Varnell's Station on Sherman's left flank. McPherson's army marched south-southeast from Lee and Gordon Mill to Ship's Gap and then east to Villanow. Garrard's cavalry division was supposed to lead McPherson's columns but it was delayed; Sherman ordered the offensive to begin without it.

On May 8, in the Battle of Rocky Face Ridge, the IV Corps brigade of Charles Garrison Harker seized the northern tip of the ridge and other units moved up to Buzzard Roost Pass. At Dug Gap 6 mi (9.7 km) south, John W. Geary's XX Corps division tried to force its way through the ridge but failed. However, these actions were designed to divert Johnston's attention from McPherson's force. In fact, Wheeler's cavalry detected McPherson's column, but Johnston was convinced that it was headed for Rome. Johnston ordered that Loring's division march to Rome from Alabama and that William T. Martin's cavalry division should also go there. Meanwhile, James Cantey's brigade arrived at Resaca. At first, Johnston ordered it to march to Dalton, but reconsidered and instructed it to stay at Resaca.

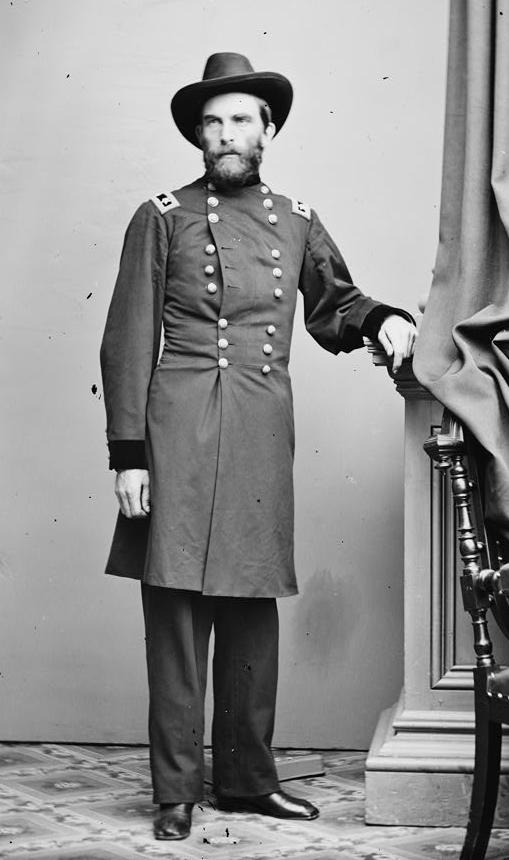
Grenville Dodge

After a 20 mi (32.2 km) march on May 9, the XVI Corps division of Thomas W. Sweeny passed through the 4 mi (6.4 km) long gorge of Snake Creek Gap and reached its southern exit. The other XVI Corps division of James C. Veatch and two XV Corps divisions marched as far as the northern end of the gap that evening. The third XV Corps division was guarding the wagon train and Garrard's cavalry was still distant. Sherman directed Kilpatrick to assist McPherson by sending a cavalry brigade. McPherson let Sherman know he was in Snake Creek Gap and issued orders to advance to Resaca the next morning. Cleburne later wrote that Johnston's chief of staff William W. Mackall told him that the gap was undefended because of "a flagrant disobedience to orders", but did not name the guilty party.

On the night of May 9, Cantey reported to Johnston that cavalry sighted Union troops near Villanow. Therefore, Johnston ordered J. Warren Grigsby's cavalry brigade to occupy Snake Creek Gap. As Grigsby's troopers approached the gap at mid-morning of May 10, they encountered McPherson's advance elements, the 9th Illinois Mounted Infantry and the 66th Illinois Infantry Regiments. Grigsby immediately ordered his cavalrymen to delay the Union advance toward Resaca. By 2 pm, Dodge's two XVI Corps divisions reached a crossroads about 2 mi (3.2 km) west of Resaca. Leaving Veatch's division to watch the road from the north, Dodge pressed on with Sweeny's division and routed a 1,400-man Confederate force defending Bald Hill. Cantey had only 4,000 men to defend Resaca, including Grigsby's cavalry.

According to William R. Scaife, the Confederate force included a brigade under Daniel H. Reynolds and two 4-gun batteries armed with 12-pounder Napoleons. Another source, Cox stated that Reynolds' brigade was at Dug Gap.

At 4 pm, Logan's two divisions reached the crossroads, releasing Veatch's division. Veatch's men crossed Camp Creek on Sweeny's left and approached the railroad. Meanwhile, Sweeny's division pressed forward and got within 200 yd (183 m) of the railroad. McPherson, worried that he was walking into a trap, recalled both of Dodge's divisions and marched his command back to Snake Creek Gap after losing 6 killed, 30 wounded, and 16 captured. His orders were to break the railroad, but all his troops accomplished was to cut down some telegraph wire.

== Battle ==
=== Preliminaries ===
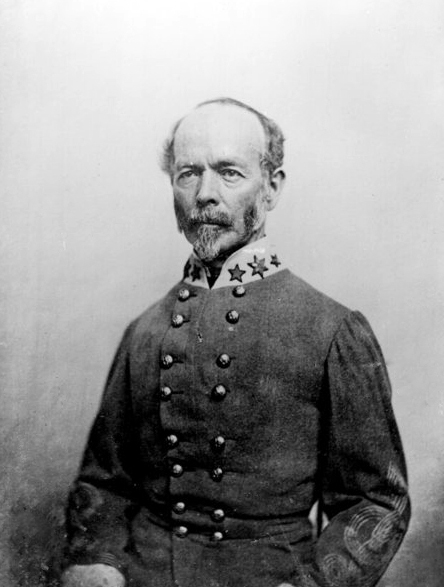
Joseph E. Johnston

On May 9, Thomas and Schofield sent skirmish lines to probe the Confederate defenses on Rocky Face Ridge. Johnston deployed Hardee's corps on the left and Hood's corps on the right. Only Harker's brigade pressed its attack, but it was repulsed. When reports of Union forces at Snake Creek Gap reached Johnston, the Confederate commander sent the divisions of Cleburne and Walker to Tilton, north of Resaca. On May 10, Sherman learned McPherson had failed to cut the railroad and immediately sent Hooker's XX Corps to join him at Snake Creek Gap; leaving Howard's IV Corps in front of Rocky Face Ridge, he then followed Hooker with the rest of the army. On May 11, Polk reached Resaca with Loring's division; next day, Palmer's and Schofield's corps followed, while Johnston evacuated Dalton that night and marched his troops south to Resaca.

On the afternoon of May 12, Sherman arrived at McPherson's headquarters. The first words he said to his subordinate were, "Well, Mac, you have missed the opportunity of a lifetime". Later that day, Thomas also arrived and informed Sherman that Johnston's wagon train was sighted moving south toward Resaca, indicating that the Confederates were probably retreating. Sherman ordered the XIV Corps to hurry up and that formation hiked through Snake Creek Gap that night. Howard's IV Corps and Stoneman's cavalry division, which had finally arrived at the front, occupied Dalton on the morning of May 13. Howard notified Sherman at 9 am that Dalton was evacuated via a temporary telegraph line strung between his headquarters and McPherson's. In the morning, Sherman's forces advanced toward Resaca, getting within 2 mi (3.2 km) by 10 am. Kilpatrick led his cavalry on a reconnaissance and was wounded soon afterward.

Logan's XV Corps deployed with Veatch's XVI Corps division on its right and elements of the XX Corps on it left and at 1 pm began pressing back Confederate skirmishers. By 4:30 pm, Logan's troops drove the Confederates from Bald Hill and confronted a heavily defended line of entrenchments outside Resaca. By the evening of May 13, Sherman's forces were aligned, from right to left, as follows: Veatch's division, Logan's corps, Daniel Butterfield's XX Corps division with the other two XX Corps divisions in reserve, and Palmer's XIV Corps. Two of Schofield's XXIII Corps divisions were behind XIV Corps while the third division, Alvin Peterson Hovey's, guarded Snake Creek Gap. Sweeny's XVI Corps division was west of Resaca. Garrard's cavalry division was near Villanow and Kilpatrick's cavalry, temporarily led by Eli Long, watched the north bank of the Oostanaula River.

The Union forces were confronted by the bulk of Johnston's army. Only the divisions of Bate, Hindman, and Stewart were still marching from Dalton and reached Resaca that evening. Stoneman's and McCook's cavalry and Howard's IV Corps pushed south from Dalton, slowed by Wheeler's effective delaying tactics. Johnston deployed Polk's corps on the Confederate left flank, facing west with its left resting on the Oostanaula. Hardee's corps held the center also facing west. Hood's corps defended the right flank, facing to the north with its right touching the Conasauga River. Part of Walker's division was in reserve while the other part was at Calhoun, farther south.

=== May 14 ===
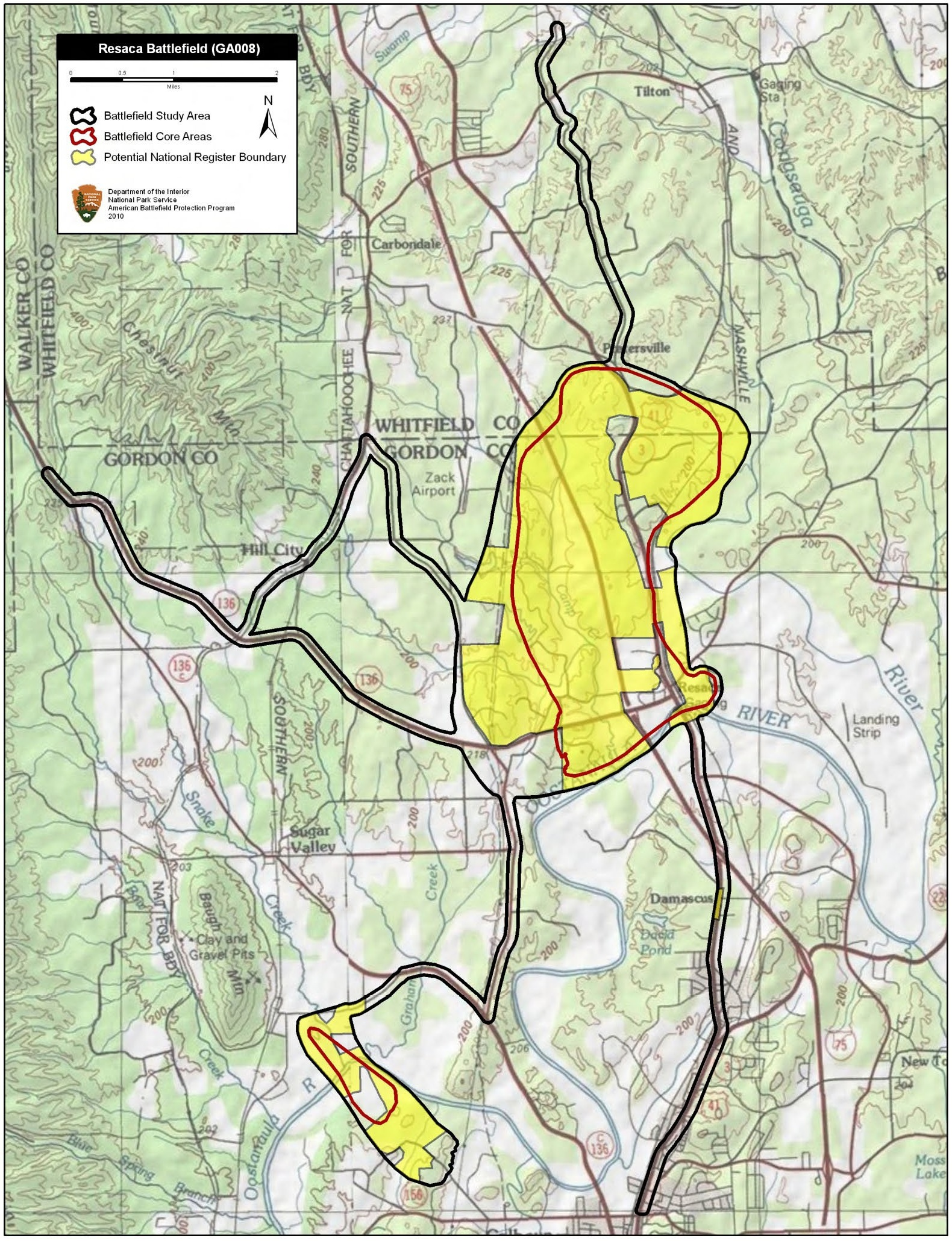
Map of Resaca Battlefield core and study areas by the American Battlefield Protection Program.

Sherman thought that Johnston intended to retreat from Resaca, a belief strengthened by seeing the Confederate wagon train crossing to the south bank of the Oostanaula. In fact, Johnston hoped Sherman would attack him and offer the chance to deal the Union army a counterblow. Sherman ordered up his Cumberland Pontoons so that Kilpatrick's cavalry could cross the Oostanaula and damage the railroad. He also wanted Garrard's cavalry to cross and move toward Rome. Meanwhile, Sherman wanted the Union infantry to attack so that Johnston would be unable to stop Kilpatrick and Garrard. Thomas suggested sending McPherson's army and Hooker's corps across the Oostanaula to be in a position to interfere with a possible Confederate retreat. Sherman rejected that idea. The pontoons arrived on the morning of May 14 and they were at Lay's Ferry on the Oostanaula a few hours later. During the morning, at Sherman's behest, McPherson ordered Sweeny's division to cross the Oostanaula and for Garrard to march to Rome.

When Howard's IV Corps arrived from the north at 11 am, Sherman ordered Palmer's XIV Corps and Schofield's XXIII Corps (on Palmer's left) to advance. Sherman believed they were striking the Confederate right flank. In fact, the Union troops were unwittingly attacking the Confederate right-center. The Union soldiers blundered through heavy underbrush and suddenly confronted Confederate entrenchments on the east side of Camp Creek. Henry M. Judah's XXIII Corps division recklessly charged, ran into intense rifle and cannon fire, and was bloodily repulsed. On Judah's left, Cox's XXIII Corps division encountered an advanced line of rifle pits and seized them after a bitter struggle. On Judah's right, Absalom Baird's XIV Corps division was quickly turned back by heavy fire after suffering 135 casualties. By 3 pm, Judah's division lost 700 killed or wounded while Cox's troops sustained losses of 66 killed and 486 wounded. Subsequently, Union artillery unlimbered and took the Confederate lines under a withering bombardment.

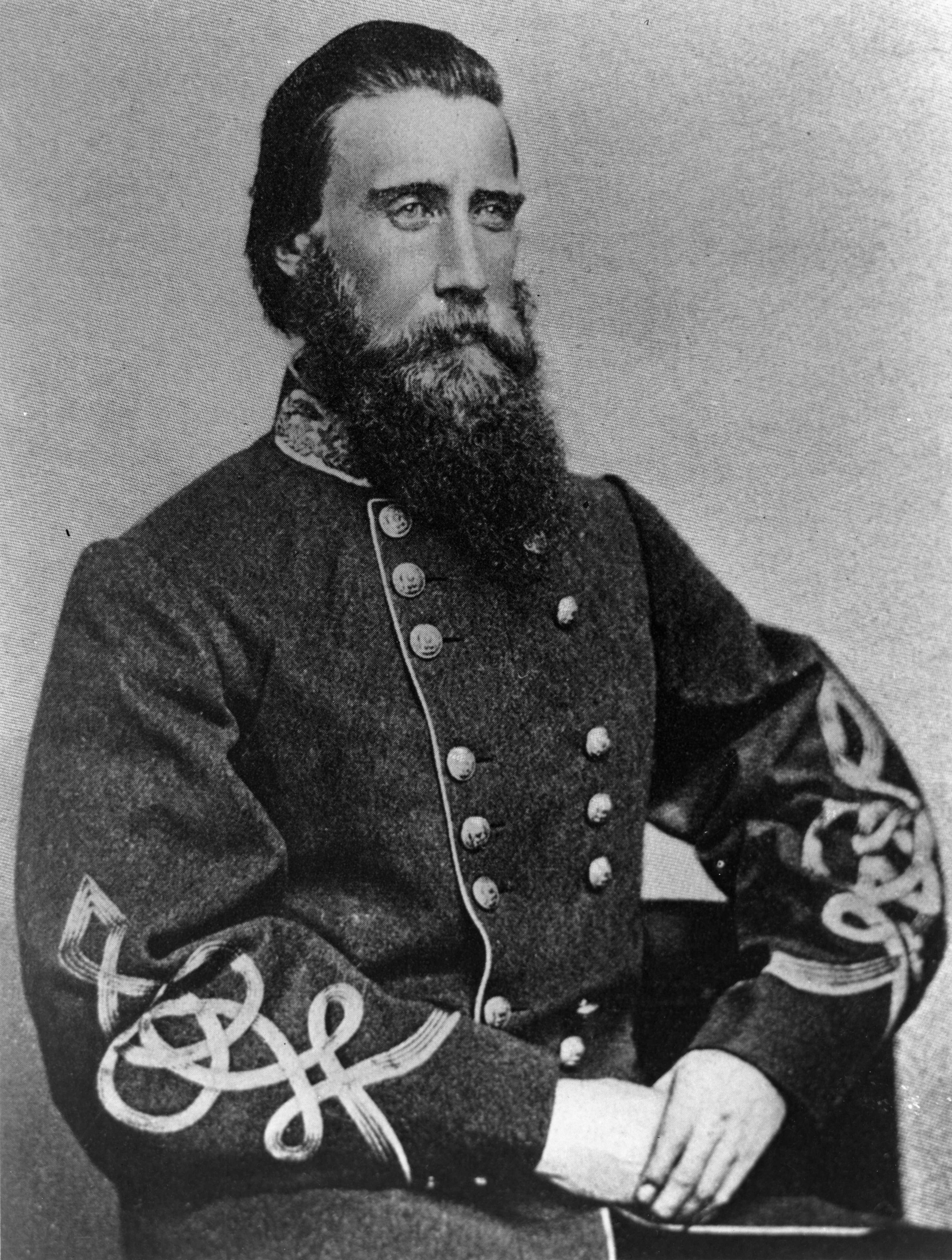
John Bell Hood

At 4 pm, Johnston noticed that David S. Stanley's division of Howard's corps had its left flank exposed and ordered Hood to attack it. At 5 pm, the divisions of Stewart and Stevenson advanced, supported by three brigades from Walker's division and one brigade from Loring's division. Stanley called for help, formed his division into a long thin line, and posted Peter Simonson's 5th Indiana Battery on the extreme left flank. Howard asked for reinforcements and the division of Alpheus S. Williams from Hooker's corps was sent. Stevenson's soldiers overwhelmed Stanley's two left brigades but when they tried to overrun the 5th Indiana Battery, they were driven back by deadly fire from its six M1857 12-pounder Napoleons and 3-inch Ordnance rifles. Stevenson's division tried a second attack and was repulsed by some of Stanley's rallied Union infantry and close-range blasts of double canister shot from the cannons. By the time the Confederates attempted a third attack, Williams' division arrived and repelled it with heavy losses. On Stevenson's right, Stewart's division moved too far to the right and never made contact with the Union flank.

During the afternoon, Peter Joseph Osterhaus detected weakness in the Confederate skirmish line and pushed the 12th Missouri Infantry forward. The regiment captured the bridge over Camp Creek and entrenched a position protecting the span. At 5 pm, McPherson became aware that the Confederates opposing him were sending troops to the north. Determined to stop the transfer of more troops, he ordered two XV Corps brigades to seize a hill on the other side of Camp Creek. Charles R. Woods' brigade from Osterhaus's division and Giles Alexander Smith's brigade from Morgan Lewis Smith's division crossed the creek and captured the hill. At 7:30 pm, Cantey's division and Alfred Jefferson Vaughan Jr.'s brigade tried three times to retake the hill, but failed in the face of cannon projectiles from Louis Voelker's Battery F, 2nd Missouri and rifle fire. Because artillery placed on the hill could hit the railroad and wagon bridges, Johnston ordered a pontoon bridge to be placed out of cannon range. At Lay's Ferry, Sweeny's division managed a successful assault crossing of the Oostanaula. However, after receiving a report that Confederates were building a bridge upstream, Sweeny withdrew from his bridgehead.

=== May 15 ===
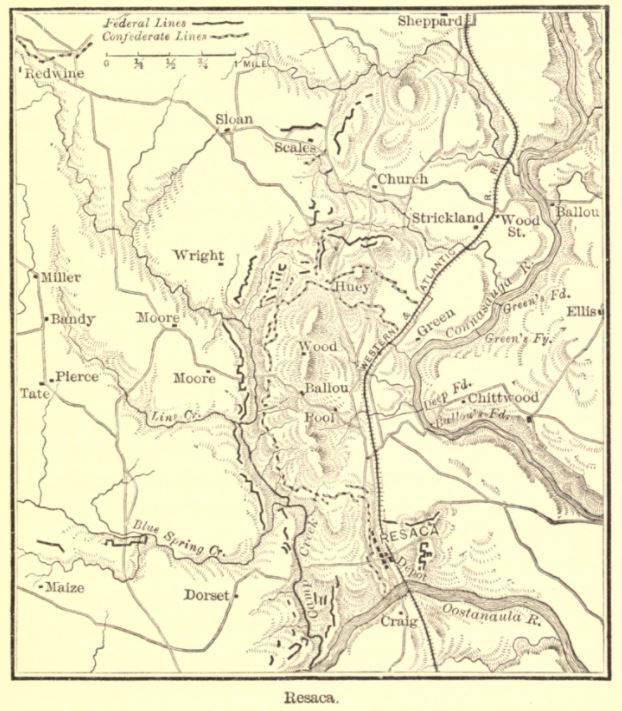
Resaca battle map from Jacob D. Cox's Atlanta

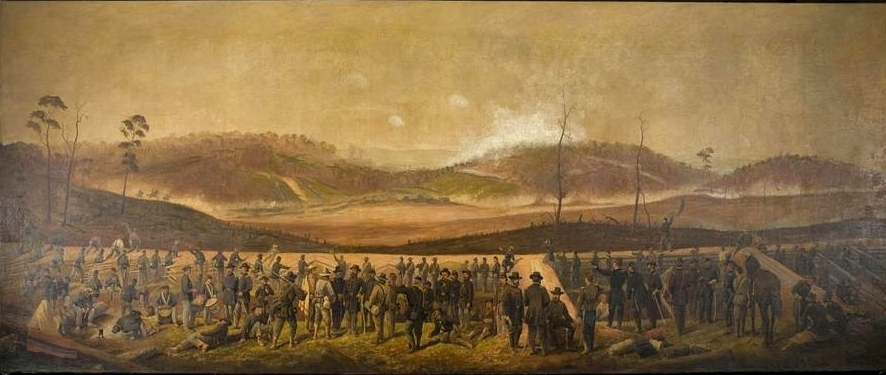
The Battle of Resaca by James Walker was stored for many years in various locations, but was re-discovered in 2010.

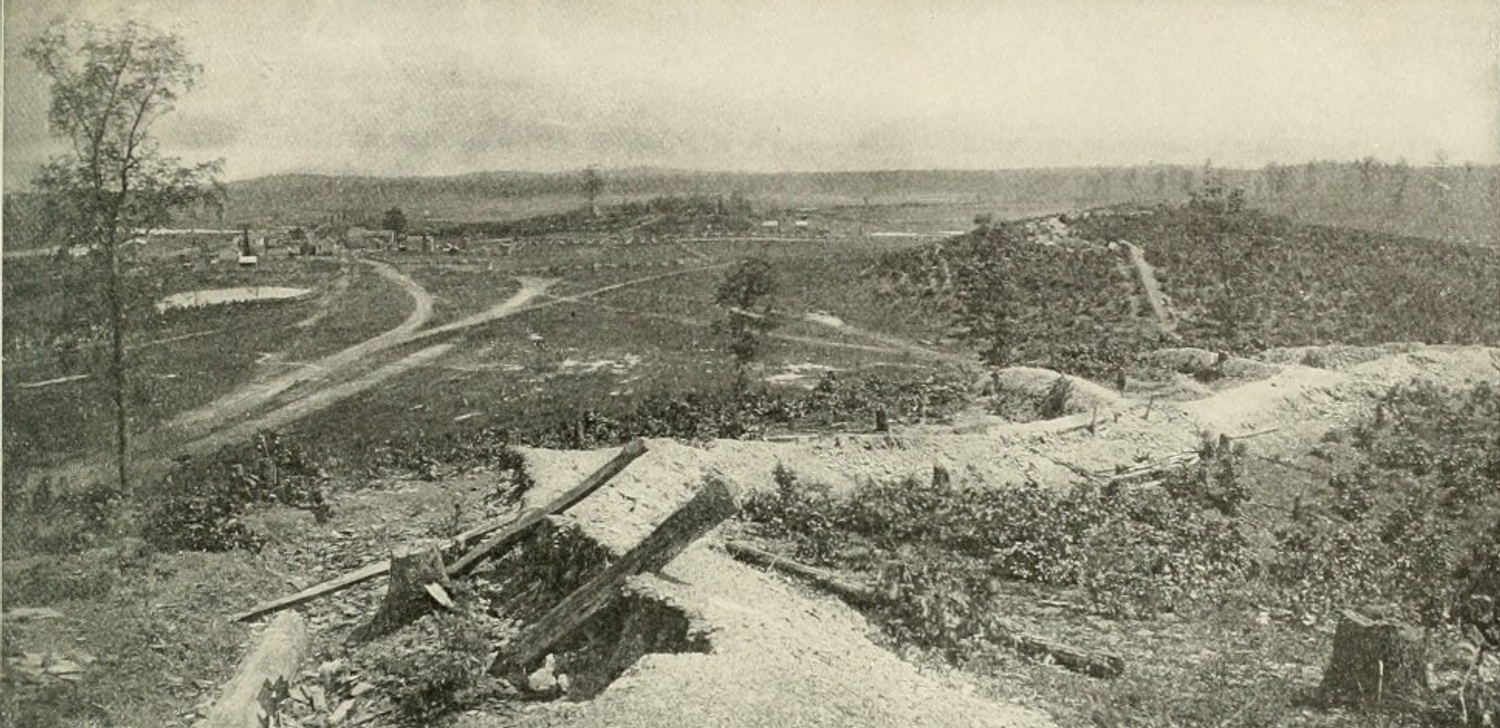
Confederate earthworks overlooking the battlefield at Resaca, 1864. "Battles and Leaders of the Civil War" Vol 4 p.299 identifies this view as taken on "Extreme Left (View Looking South) of the Confederate Lines at Resaca...The cluster of houses include the railway station, the railway running generally parallel with the earth-works here seen, which in the distance desccend to the Oostenaula River. The railway and wagon bridges mentioned in the notes on p.266 are near the railway station."

On May 15, Sherman ordered Howard's and Hooker's corps to attack from the north and drive toward Resaca. McPherson was directed to hold his ground in the expectation that he would be attacked. Palmer's corps was also ordered to hold its ground. Schofield was instructed to pull his corps out of line and move it to the left flank. Johnston originally planned to attack the Federal left flank again, but canceled that plan when he heard that Union forces had bridged the Oostanaula and gained a foothold in Polk's defenses. During the morning, the only action occurred when some of Stoneman's cavalry crossed the Conasauga and overran a Confederate hospital before being chased away. At 1 pm, Howard launched his attack and it was immediately repulsed by intense rifle and cannon fire. One general reported that his brigade suffered 120 casualties in thirty seconds before the survivors were ordered to retreat. Union brigade commander August Willich was seriously wounded in the subsequent exchange of rifle fire.

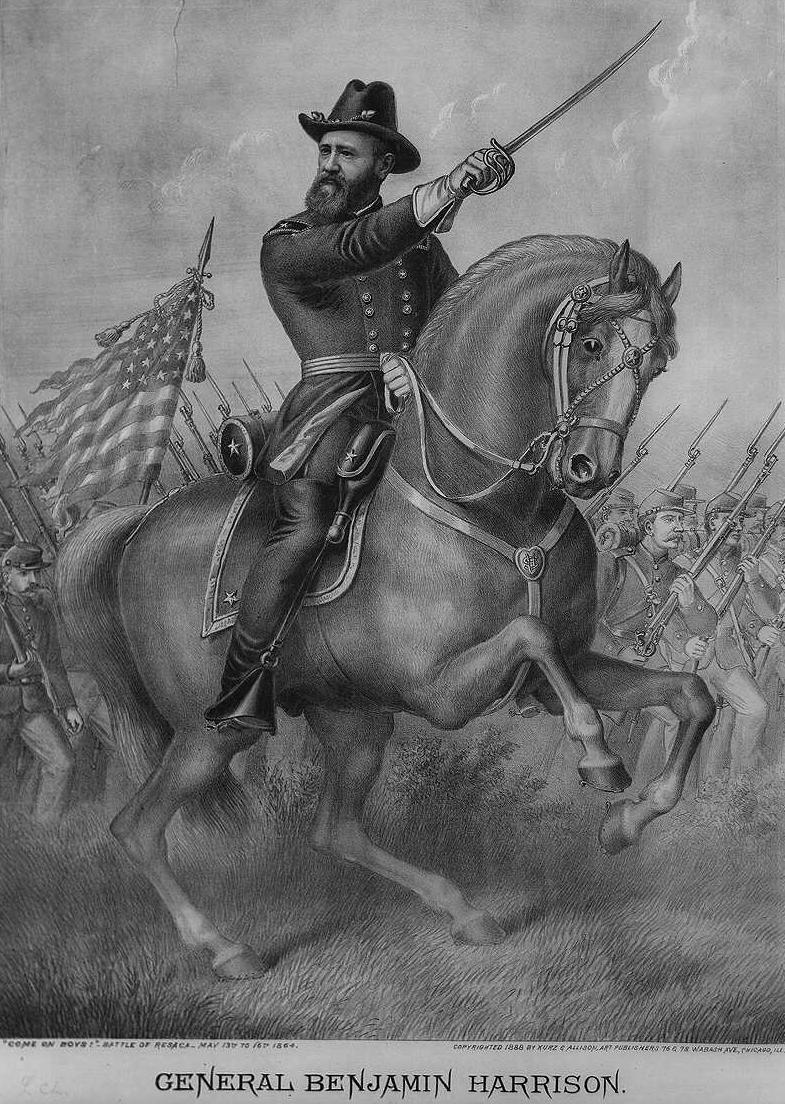
"Come on boys!" Benjamin Harrison at the Battle of Resaca.

To Howard's left, Hooker attacked with Geary's and Butterfield's divisions, about 12,000 men, at 1:30 pm. Each division's three brigades formed a brigade column, that is, with the regiments formed one behind another. However, the approach march took the brigades through dense underbrush and across ravines, which mixed up the brigades and regiments. Various units of Union soldiers emerged from the rough terrain in a haphazard way and their attacks were repelled. However, William Thomas Ward's brigade, led by Benjamin Harrison's 70th Indiana Infantry Regiment, found itself in front of Max Van Den Corput's Georgia Cherokee Battery and charged, overrunning the guns. Confederate counterattacks drove back Ward's men, but John Coburn's brigade retook the guns before also being driven back. Finally, the four 12-pounder Napoleons were left in no man's land, with neither side able to claim the guns. Hooker's corps gained no ground and suffered 1,200 casualties, including 156 in the 70th Indiana.

After Johnston heard that the Federals were no longer a threat at Lay's Ferry, he ordered Hood to attack the Union left flank again. At 4 pm, Stewart's division launched its attack as per Hood's instructions. Soon after, Walker reported that the Federals were across the Oostanaula at Lay's Ferry again. Johnston tried canceling the attack, but it was too late. By happenstance, Stewart's brigades emerged from the forest one at a time and were badly mauled by Williams' division. Williams' troops lost 48 killed and 366 wounded while inflicting 1,000 casualties on Stewart's division. Stevenson's division also lost at least 100 casualties in the botched attack. Hovey's XXIII Corps division, formed of recruits, was supposed to support Williams, but instead its soldiers hugged the ground and refused to go forward. Meanwhile, at Lay's Ferry, Sweeny learned that the Confederate bridge was a false report. So, he repeated the successful operation of the previous day and formed a bridgehead on the south bank.

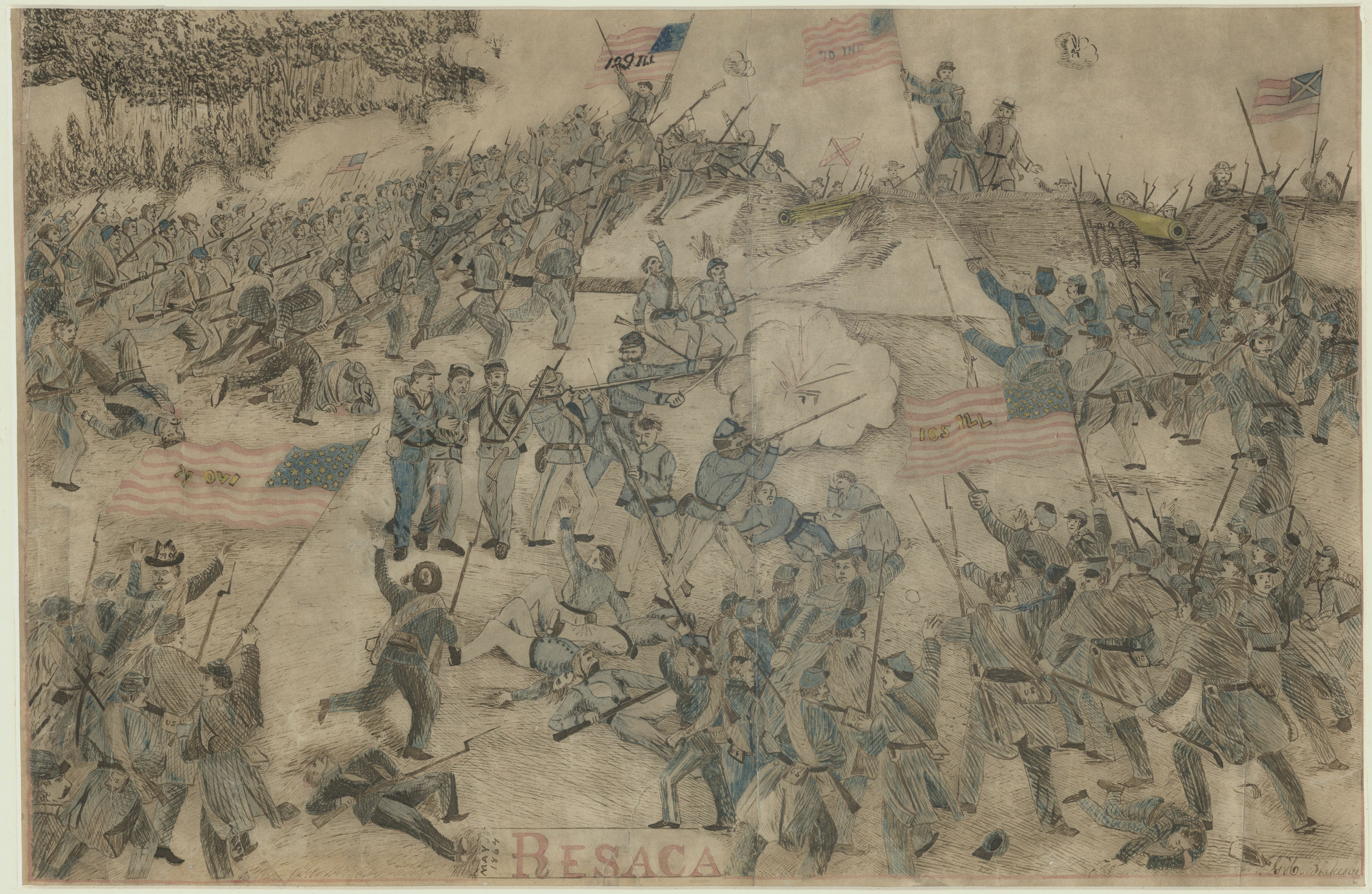
Pen and ink drawing of the Civil War battle of Resaca, GA., May 15, 1864, by G. H. Blakeslee

That evening, after meeting with Hood and Hardee, Johnston ordered his army to retreat from Resaca. He knew Sherman's army was fully entrenched from the Conasauga to the Oostanaula, and could potentially detach forces against his supply line. He saw that Union troops at Lay's Ferry bridgehead were a direct threat to his army's retreat route. Johnston directed his army to utilize the railroad and wagon bridges, plus the pontoon bridge. The four guns abandoned between the lines were the only equipment left behind. Polk's and Hardee's corps used the railroad and wagon bridges while Hood's corps used the pontoon bridge. The Confederate army passed over the Oostanaula bridges by 3:30 am, detected only at 3 am when Logan's XV Corps skirmishers found the Confederate trenches empty. Johnston's engineers removed the pontoon bridge and set fire to the other two spans, but Logan's men saved the wagon bridge from destruction and captured some stragglers.

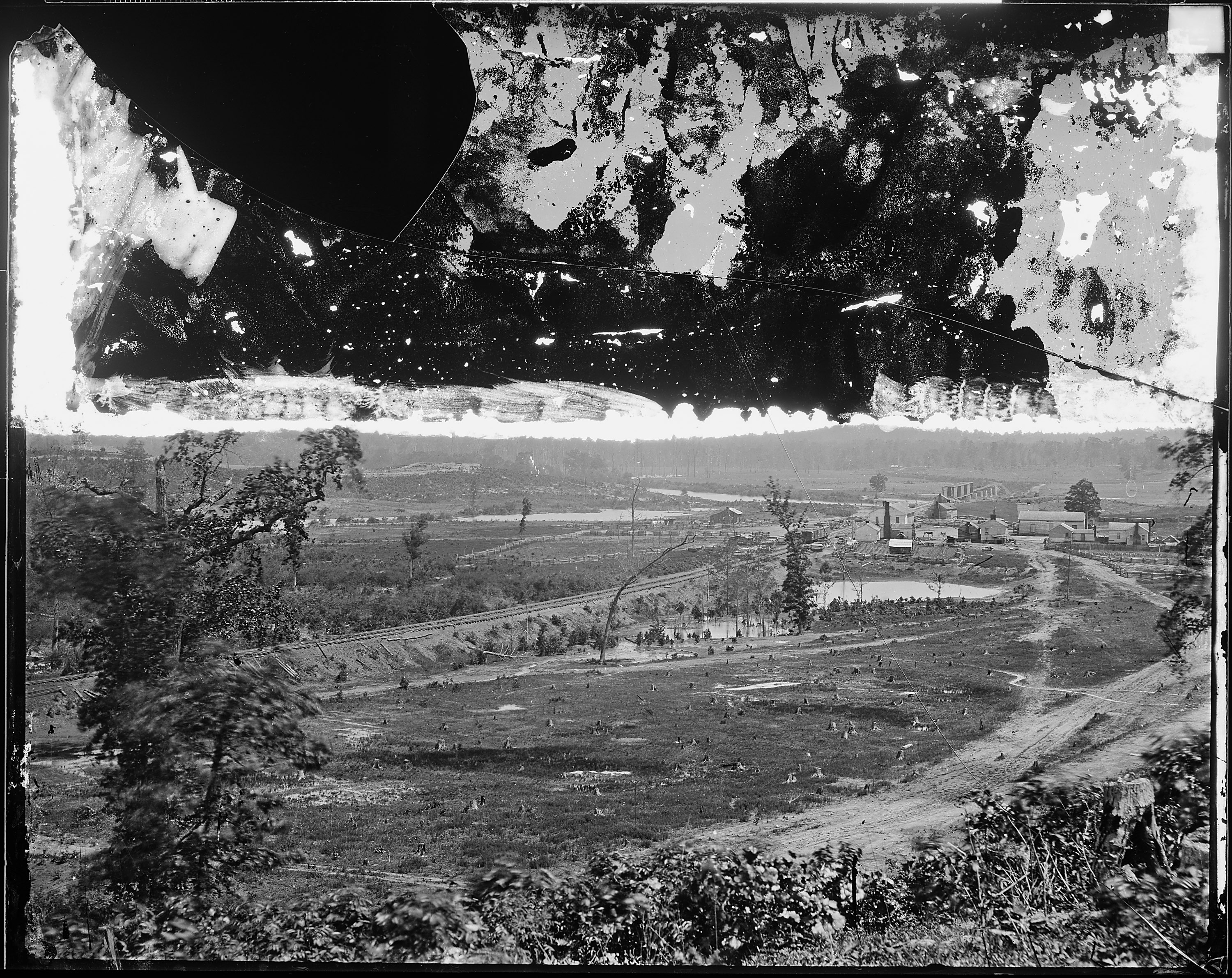
Resaca battlefield, view of railroad

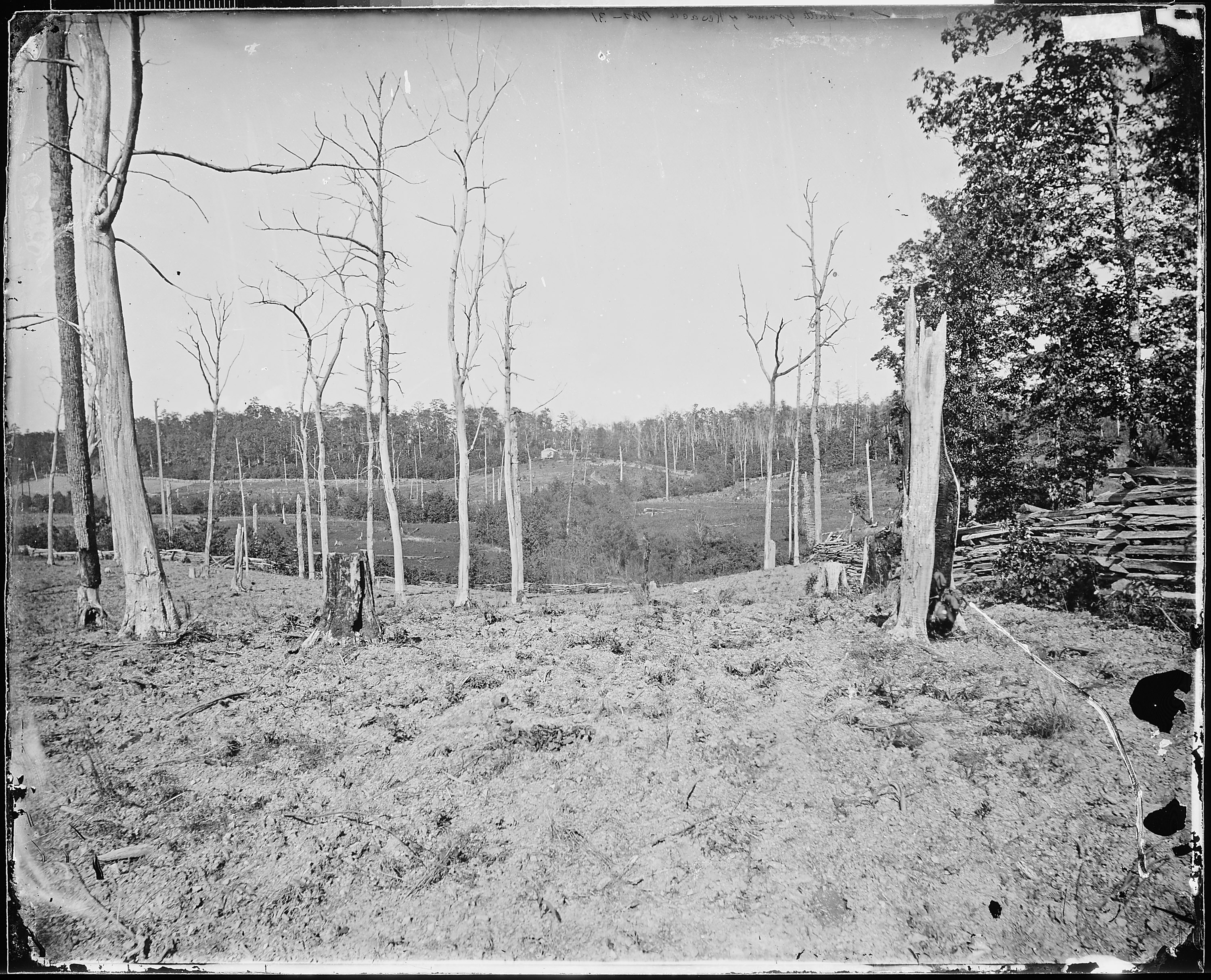
Resaca battlefield, rolling hills

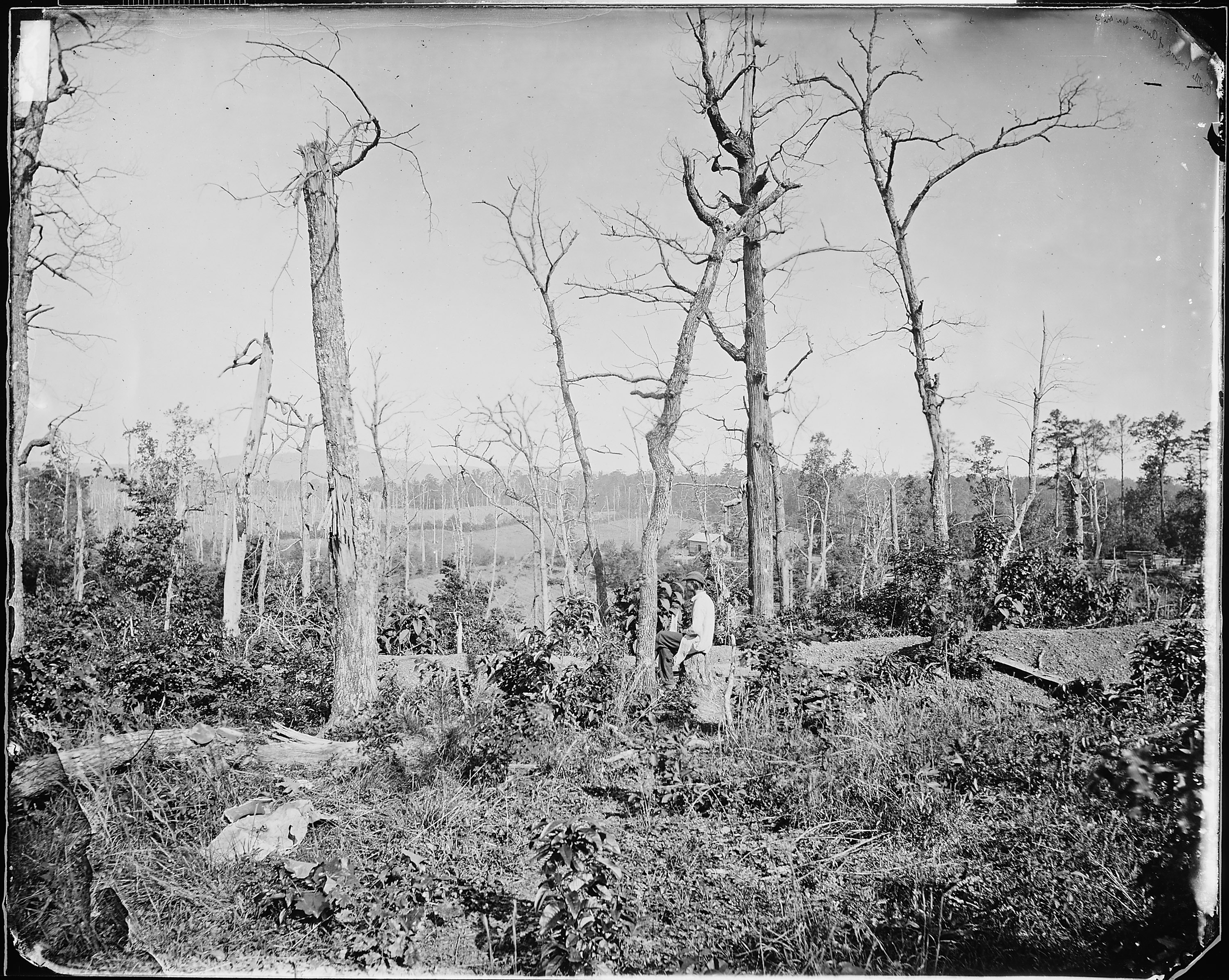
Resaca battlefield, leafless trees

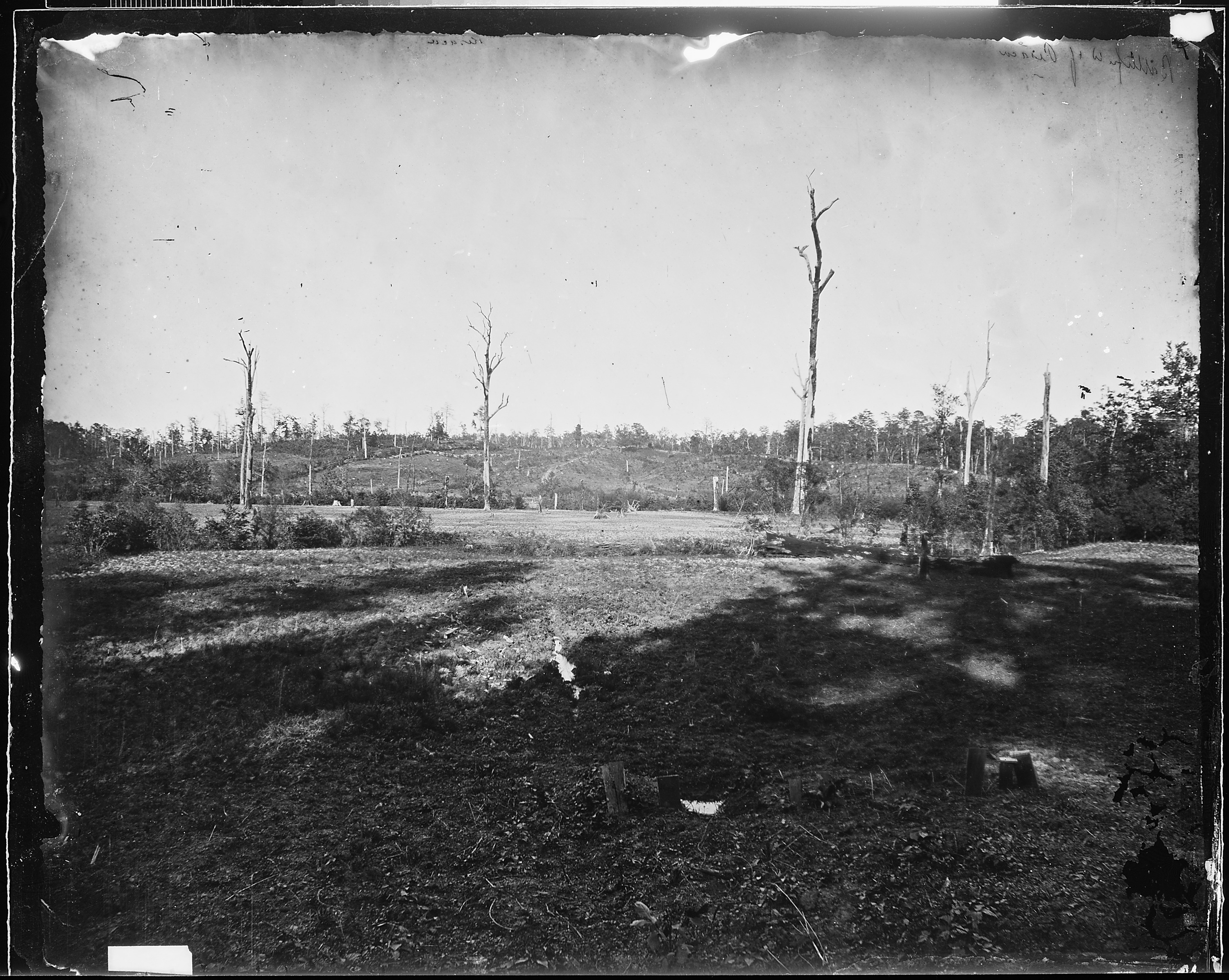
Resaca battlefield, distant ridge

== Results ==
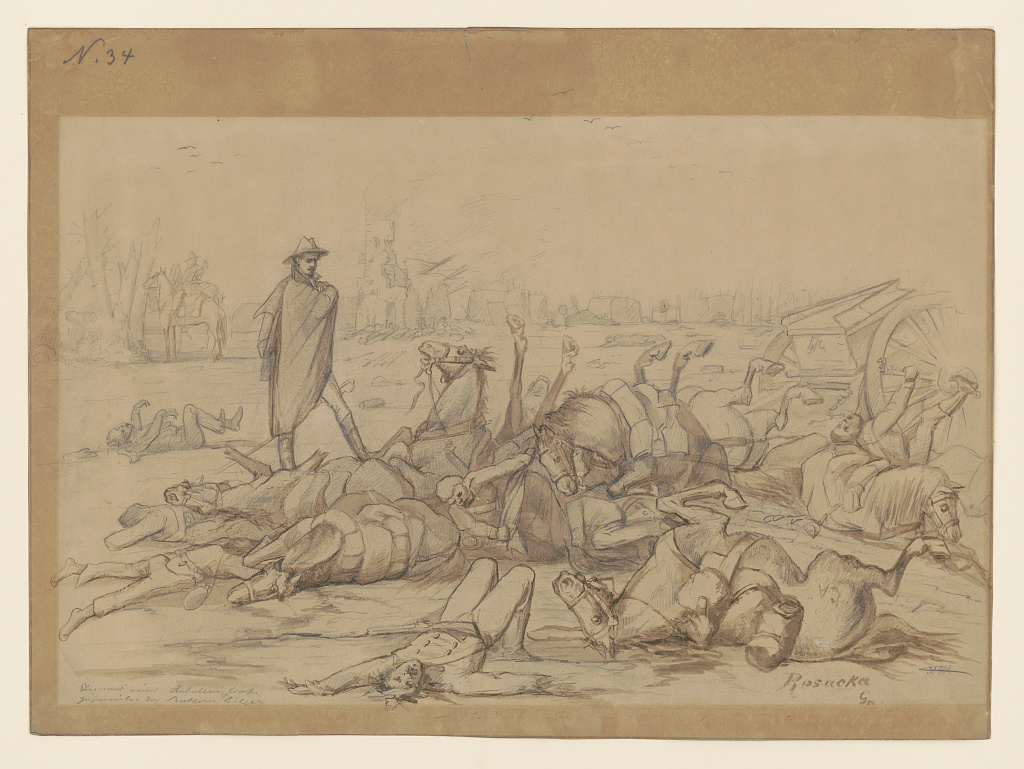
Inside Confederate fortifications after the battle at Resaca, Georgia, May 1864, showing dead horses and men of an artillery battery.

According to Castel, Union casualties at Resaca numbered 4,000 including 600 killed or mortally wounded. Confederate losses were around 3,000 of whom 500–600 men and 4 guns were captured. The American Battlefield Trust and National Park Service both listed 2,747 Union casualties and 2,800 Confederate casualties. These sources called the battle inconclusive and indecisive. Sherman forced Johnston to abandon two "tactically strong defensive positions", though the Confederate army was able to escape intact both times. Castel was critical of Sherman's handling of the battle, namely launching costly attacks, leaving his left flank open to a counterattack, failing to fire on the bridges with his artillery, and failing to utilize the Lay's Ferry bridgehead to threaten Johnston's retreat. Johnston also mounted costly attacks, but his retreat was "well-timed and well-executed". Nevertheless, Sherman managed to push Johnston back toward Atlanta and made it impossible for Johnston to send troops to Lee.

Sherman hoped to catch up with and crush Johnston's retreating army between the Oostanaula and the Etowah Rivers, a distance of 30 to 40 mi (48 to 64 km). It is the most open country in northern Georgia, because south of the Etowah the terrain becomes forested and mountainous again. Sherman sent Garrard's cavalry, followed by Jefferson C. Davis' XIV Corps division, down the west bank of the Oostanaula toward Rome. McPherson's two corps crossed at Lay's Ferry to form Sherman' right wing. Thomas' troops were ordered to follow the railroad south. At 1 pm on May 16, Howard's corps began crossing the repaired wagon bridge and reached Calhoun that evening. Schofield's and Hooker's corps marched east. They first crossed the Conasauga and then crossed the Coosawattee River at Field's Mill before turning south to form Sherman's left wing. (Note: The Conasauga and Coosawattee join near Resaca to form the Oostanaula.) Johnston retreated toward Adairsville, hoping to fight a defensive battle at that location.

== Resaca Battlefield State Historic Site ==
The battlefield is preserved as the Resaca Battlefield State Historic Site and is open Fridays and weekends. The location is 183 Resaca Lafayette Rd., Resaca, GA 30735. The American Battlefield Trust and its partners have acquired and preserved 1,044 acres of the Resaca battlefield as of mid-2023. The Friends of Resaca Battlefield and the Georgia Battlefields Association created a 500-acre battlefield park along Camp Creek.

== In popular culture ==
Ambrose Bierce's short story Killed at Resaca focused on a brave staff officer who was killed by recklessly riding into the line of fire.

== See also ==
- Atlanta campaign
- Resaca Confederate Cemetery

== Notes ==
Footnotes

Citations
