= Blue Whale of Catoosa =

Waterfront structure in Oklahoma, United States

Coordinates: 36°11′37″N 95°43′59″W

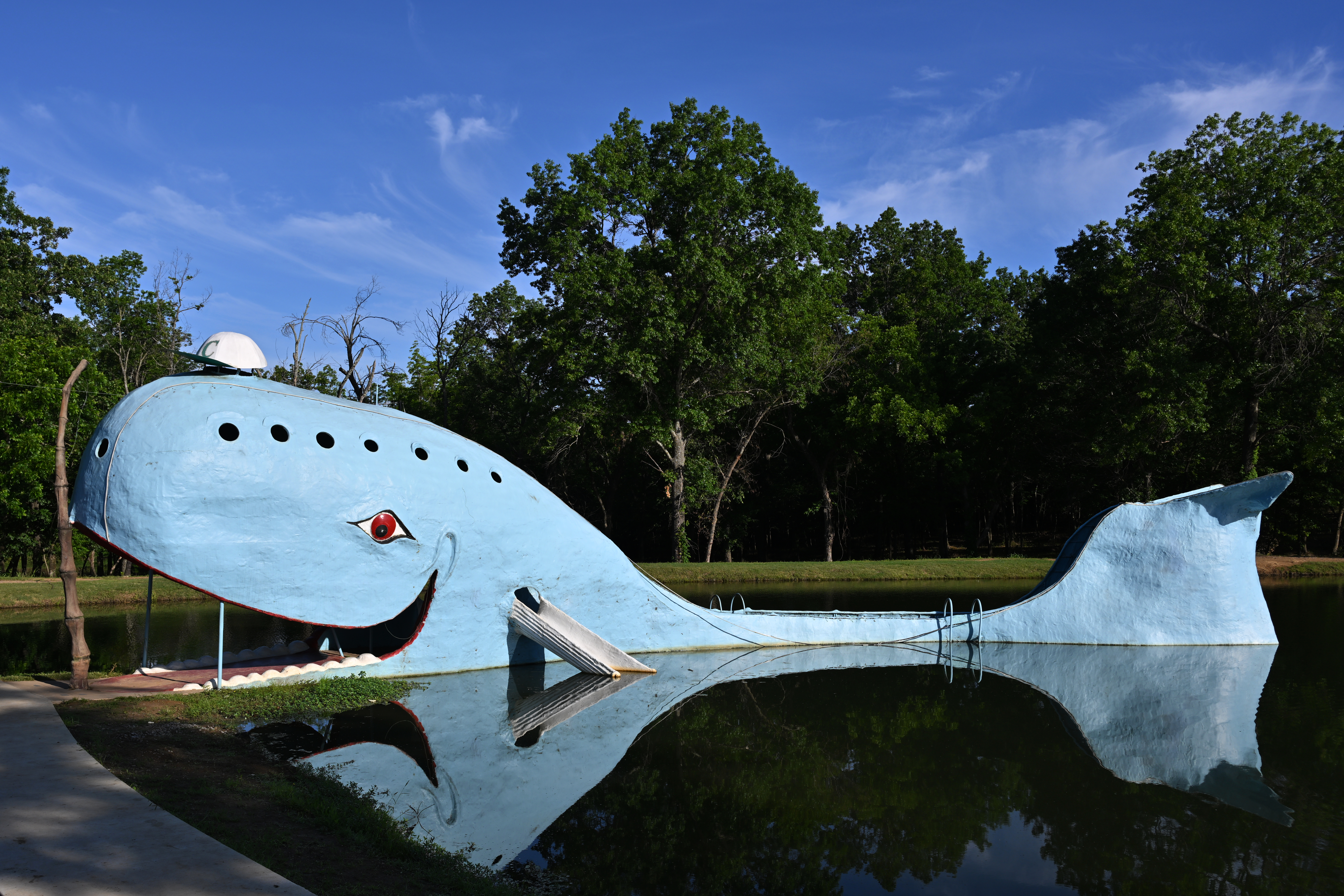
Catoosa's Blue Whale, Catoosa, OK

The Blue Whale of Catoosa is a waterfront structure, just east of the American town of Catoosa, Oklahoma, and it has become one of the most recognizable attractions on old Route 66.

== Creation ==
Local zoologist and artist Hugh Davis and his friend, Harold Thomas, built the Blue Whale in the early 1970s out of iron and concrete. It was a surprise gift to Davis' wife Zelta, who collected whale figurines. It was revealed to her on September 7, 1972 for their 34th wedding anniversary. The Blue Whale and its pond became a favored swimming hole for both locals and travelers along Route 66.

Originally, the pond surrounding the massive Blue Whale was spring fed and intended only for family use. However, as many locals began to come to enjoy its waters, Davis brought in tons of sand, built picnic tables, hired life guards, and opened it to the public.

== Public attraction ==
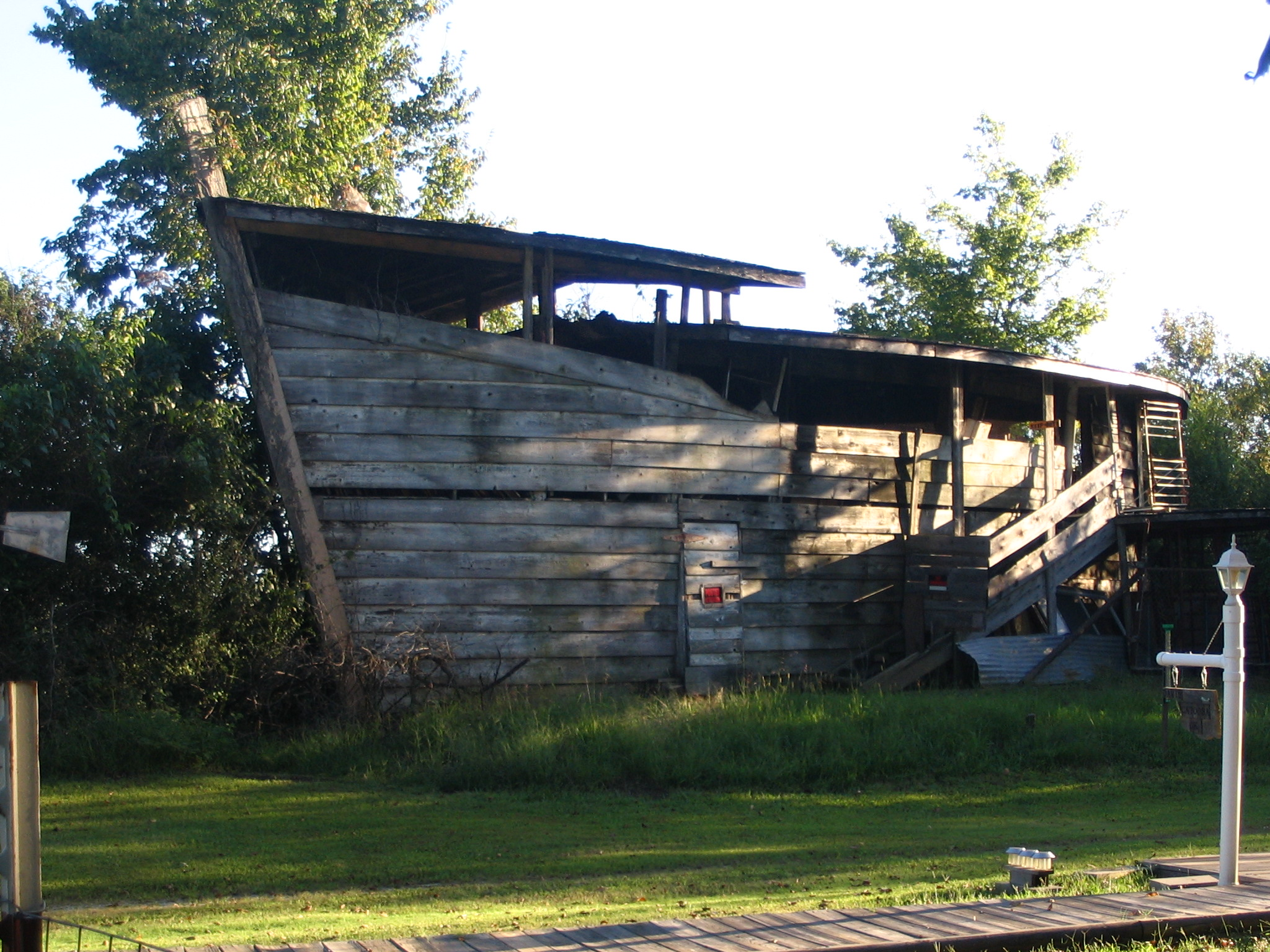
Former Animal Reptile Kingdom attraction next to the Blue Whale

Originally calling it Nature's Acres, Mr. Davis continued to add to the roadside attraction until it eventually included The Fun and Swim Blue Whale and the A.R.K. (Animal Reptile Kingdom). The attraction also featured Hugh's brother-in-law, Indian Chief Wolf-Robe Hunt, a full blooded Acoma Indian, who was famous in his own right for his Indian paintings and as a highly skilled silversmith. Chief Wolf-Robe Hunt once ran the Arrowood Trading post across the highway from the Blue Whale attraction.

By 1988, the Davises were not able to continue managing the attraction, so they closed it to the public. Davis died in January 1990, followed by his wife Zelta in 2001. The park soon fell into disrepair, crumbling from neglect and weather. However, after a decade the people of Catoosa and employees of the Hampton Inn launched a fund-raising and volunteer effort to restore the Route 66 landmark. The Blue Whale was restored in 1997 and repainted to its original brilliant blue. The adjacent picnic area has also been restored, but swimming is no longer allowed in the whale's pond.

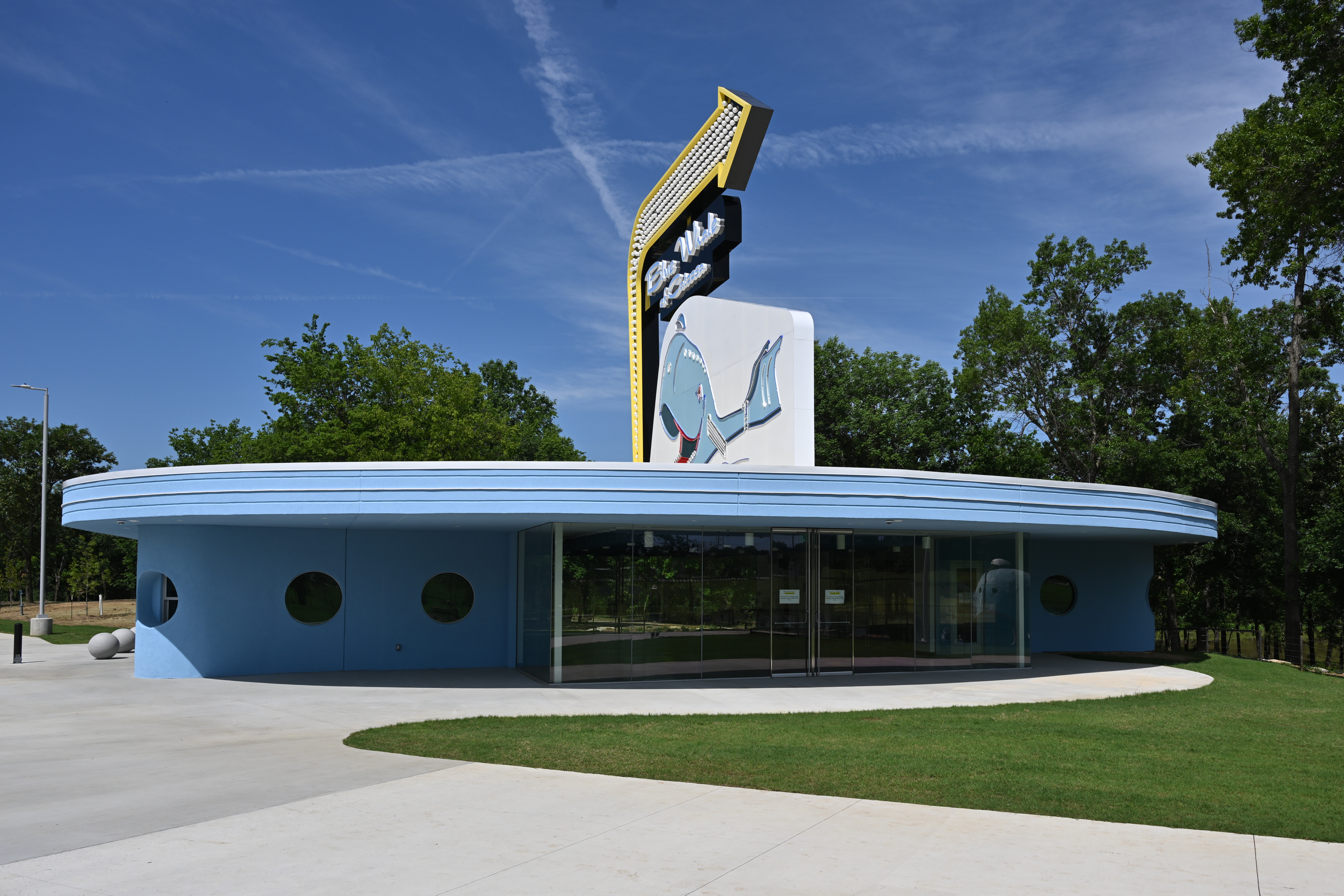
Blue Whale visitor center entrance, Catoosa, OK

The City of Catoosa bought the property from the Davis family in 2020. In June 2025, ground broke on a new visitor center for the attraction. The visitor center opened to the public on Saturday, May 30, 2026. The day began with a one-mile fun run and a 5k run. The ribbon cutting was at 2pm and, later, there was live music from various artists. At 8:30pm the event ended with fireworks.

== Popular culture ==
On July 15, 2002, the Blue Whale made a national appearance in the syndicated comic strip Zippy the Pinhead.

On the British television series An Idiot Abroad, it was shown in season 2 episode 6 when they go to Route 66.

In the film 31 written, directed and produced by Rob Zombie the Blue Whale is featured almost immediately in the opening credits.

On September 20, 2015, the Blue Whale was featured on the Food Network show, The Great Food Truck Race (season 6, episode 5, "Roadside Attractions").

On January 13, 2016, the Blue Whale was highlighted in an episode of American Pickers in an episode entitled "On the Road Again".

On November 11, 2016, the Blue Whale was the third location to sell Snapchat's new Spectacles.

In September 2018, the Blue Whale was featured in a television advertisement for the 2019 Mercedes-Benz GLC titled "Attractions".

In December 2021, the story of the Blue Whale's origin was featured in a television advertisement for Phillips 66 as part of their "Live to the Full" series.

== Gallery ==
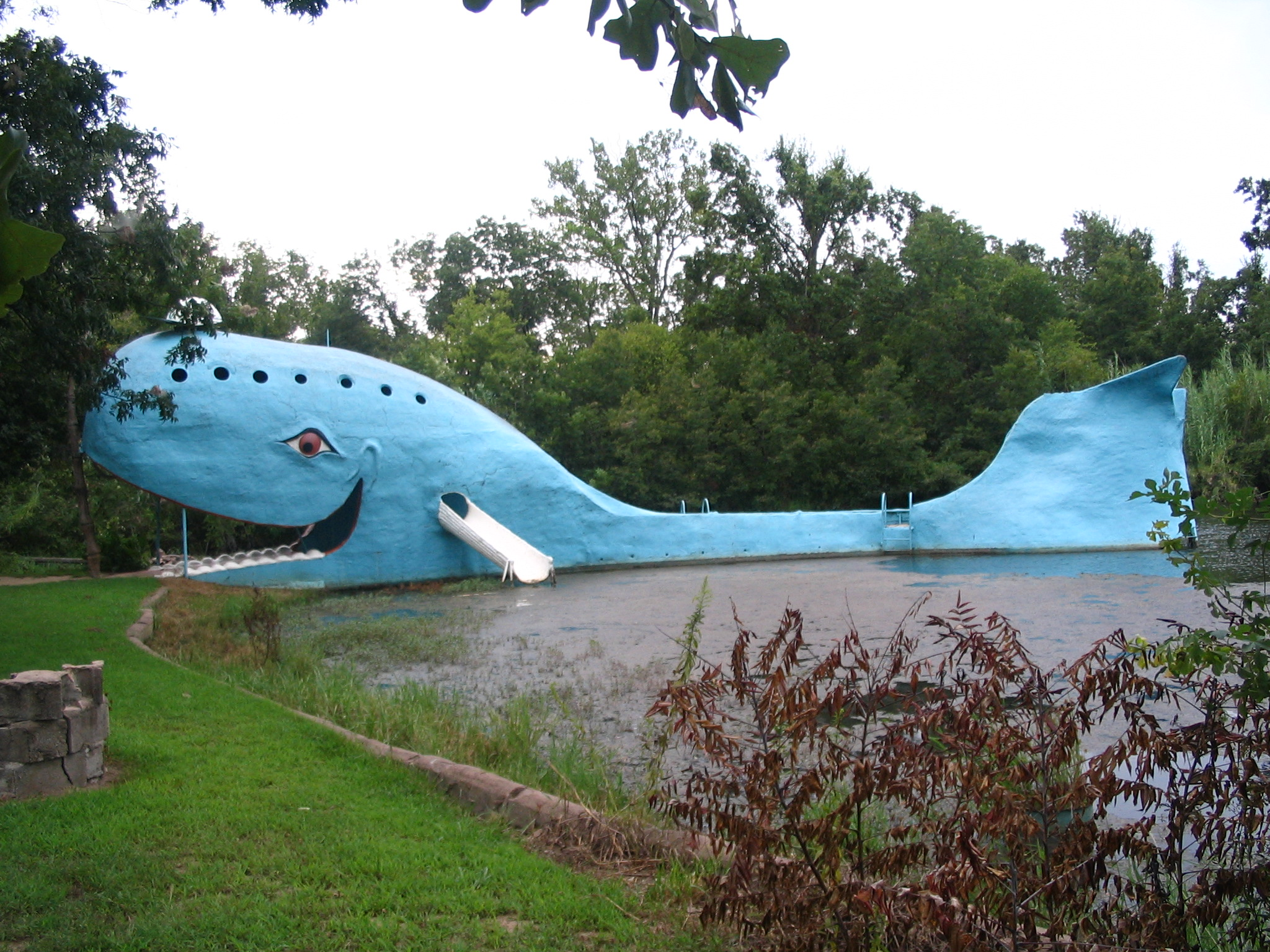
Wide photo of the Blue Whale of Catoosa

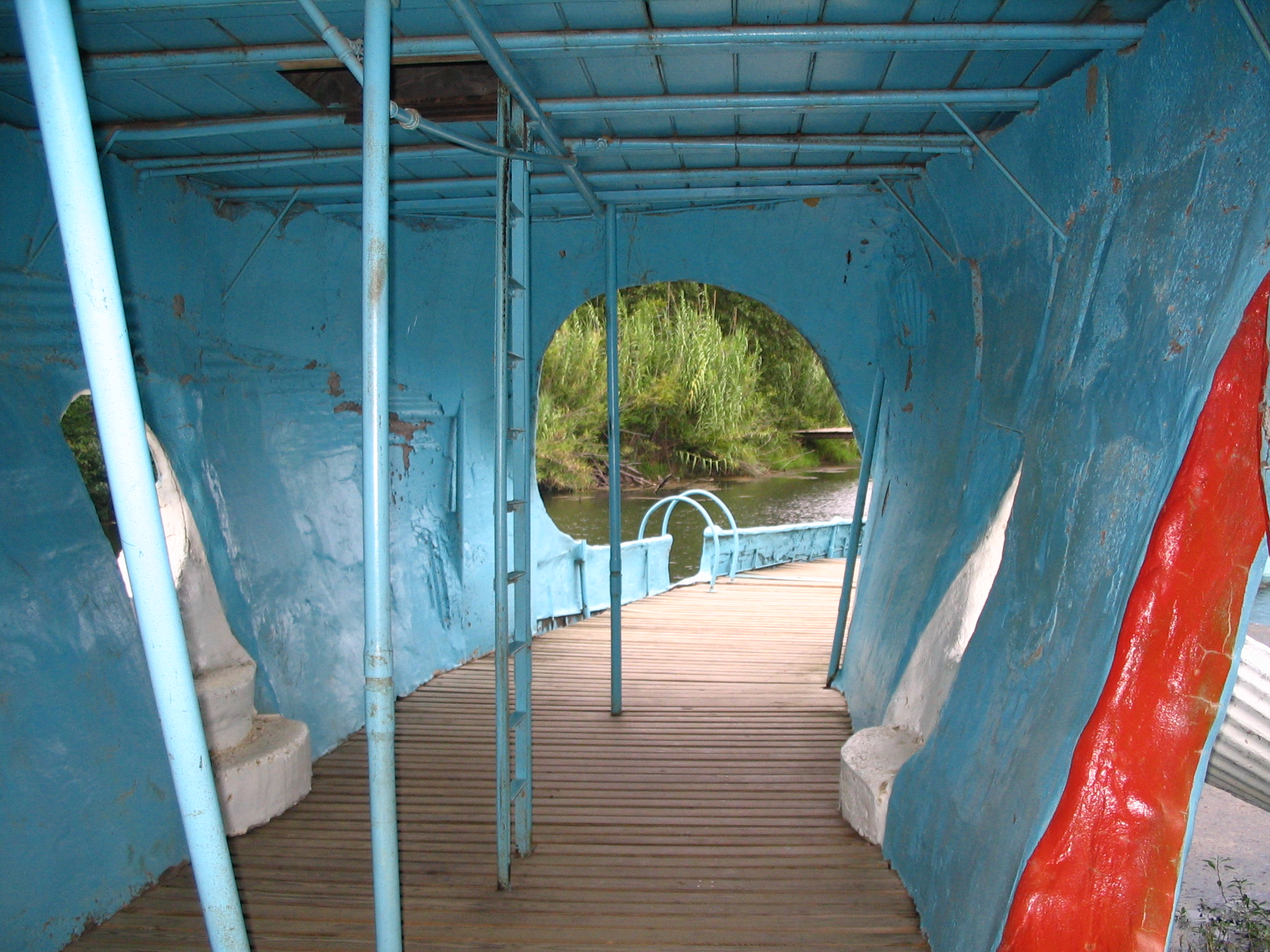
Interior of the Blue Whale

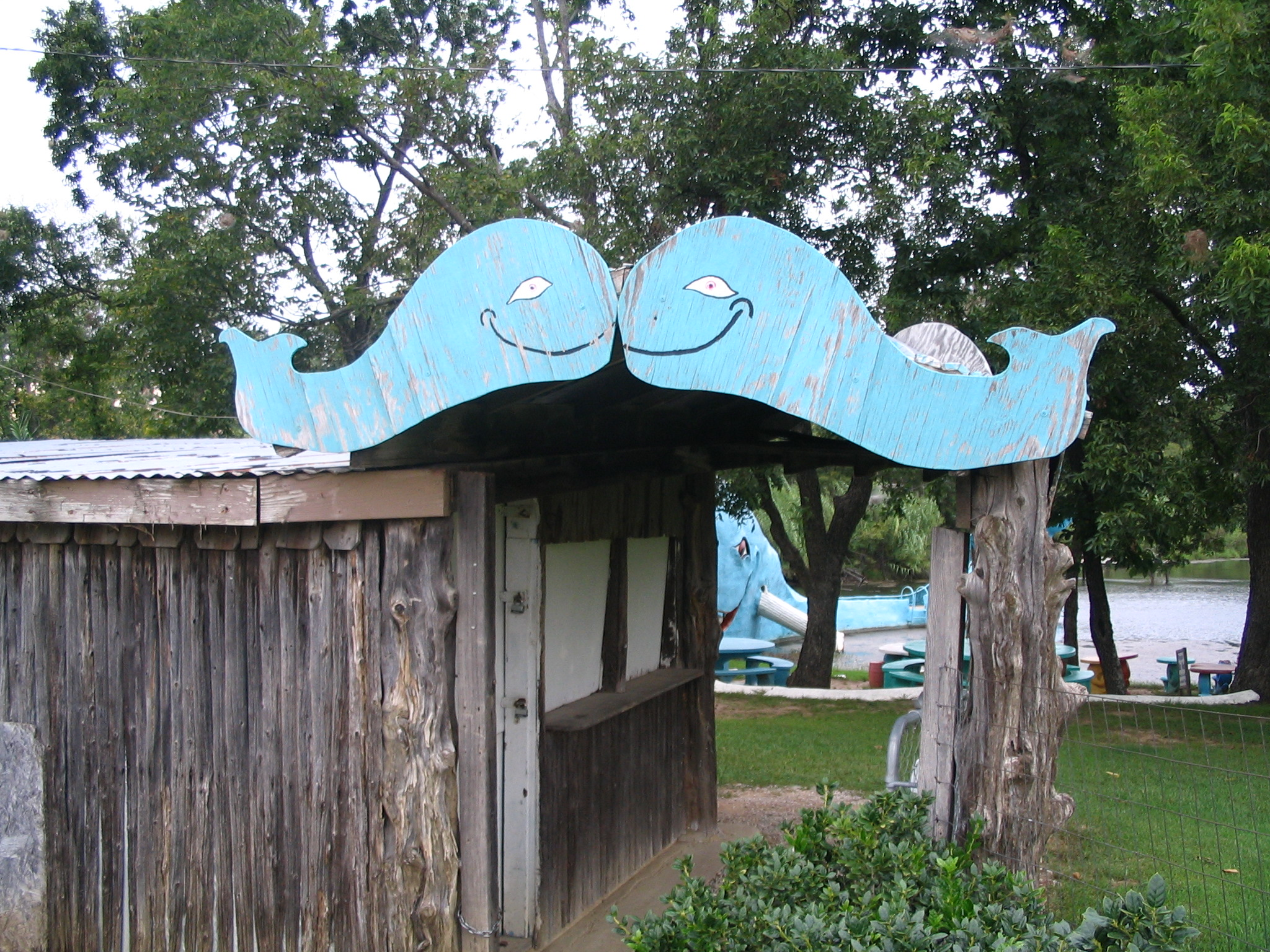
"Kissing whales" sign above right hand entrance

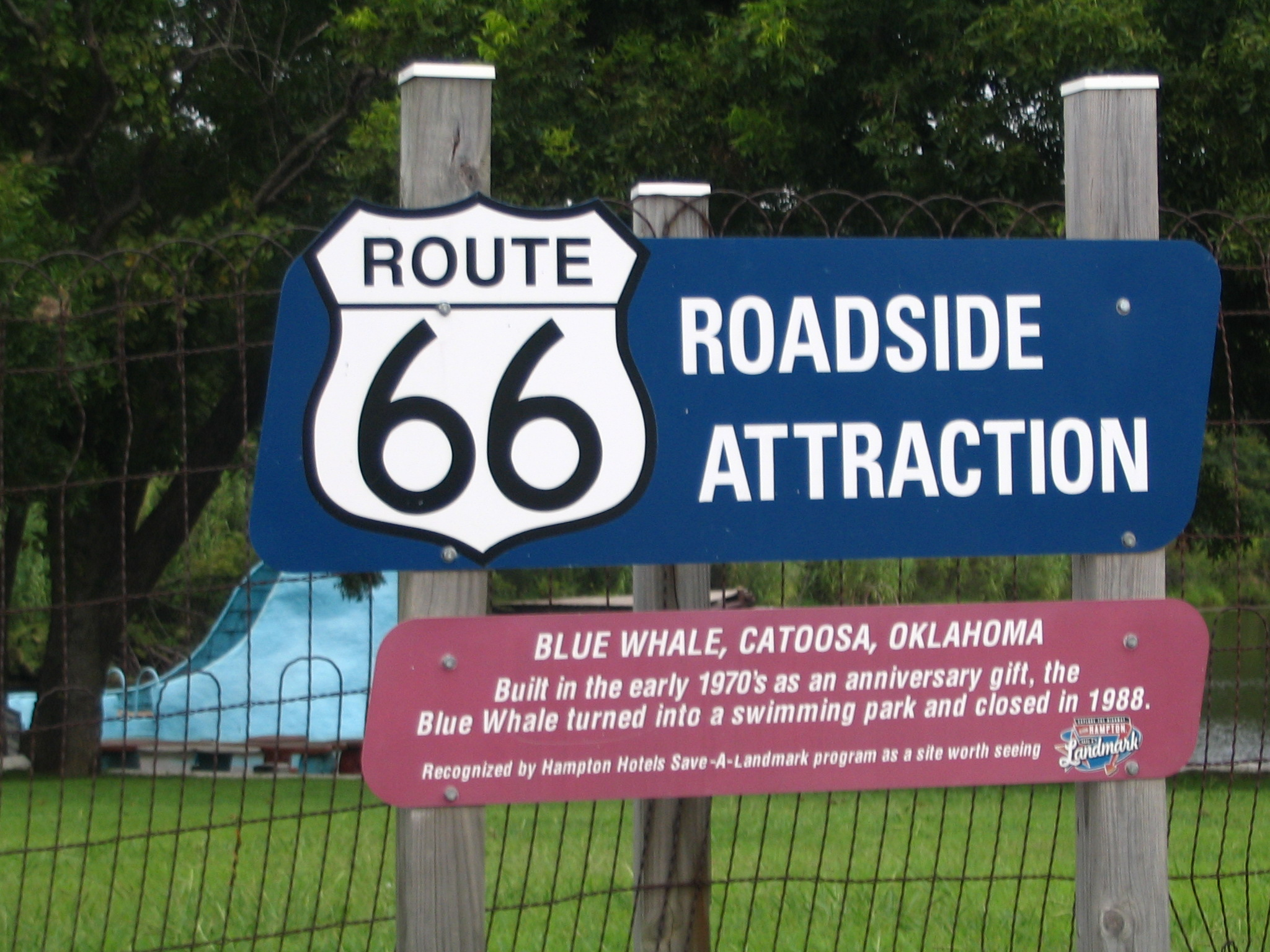
Roadside attraction info sign

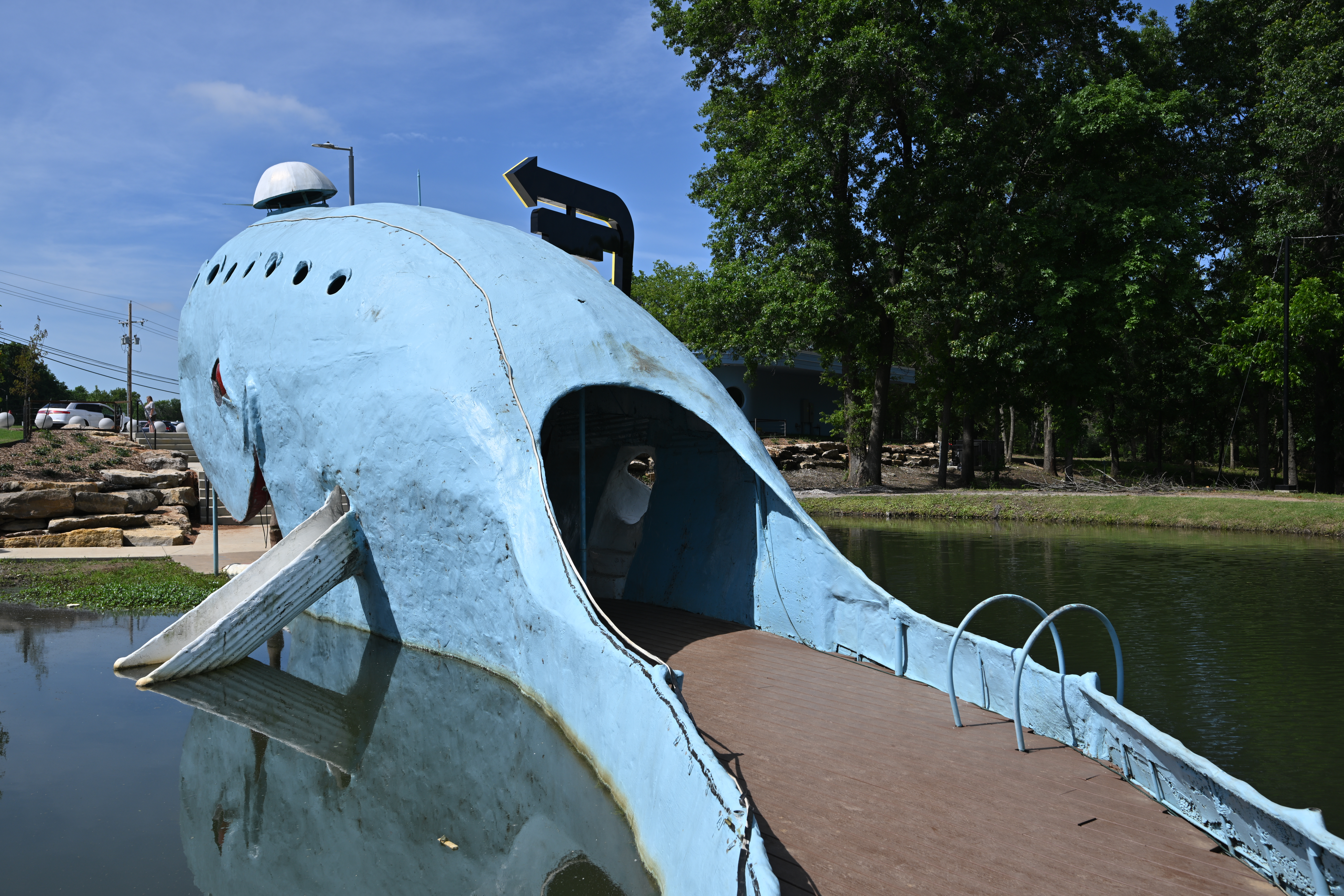
Back of the Blue Whale, Catoosa, OK
