= Catoosa High School =

Location
- 10754 e 122nd st n Catoosa, Oklahoma 74015; United States; 36.168563°N 95.755188°W

Information
- Type: Public school
- Established: 1980
- Locale: Suburban
- School district: Catoosa Public Schools
- Principal: Mitch McGrew
- Teaching staff: 31.36 (FTE)
- Enrollment: 556 (2023–2024)
- Student to teacher ratio: 17.73
- Colors: Green and white
- Nickname: Indian
- Website: catoosaps.net

Catoosa High School is a high school in the Catoosa Public Schools system, for students in ninth through twelfth grades.

== Campus ==
The campus consists of one main building, including a cafeteria. Also on the campus are the school's athletic facilities − an activity center for basketball, wrestling, and volleyball; Frank McNabb Field (football and soccer); a baseball field; a softball field, and a band room.

== Extracurricular activities ==
=== Music and arts ===
- Arts
- Choir
- Band
- Debate

=== Athletics ===
Catoosa Public School fields 16 athletics teams. The Indians have won 8 state championships in their history as recognized by the Oklahoma Secondary Schools Athletic Association.

The following is a list of the sports in which the school competes and the years, if any, during which the school's team won the state championship

- Baseball
- Boys Basketball
- Girls Basketball
- Cheer leading
- Boys Cross Country
- Girls Cross Country
- Football
- Boys Golf
- Girls Golf
- Boys Soccer
  - State champion – 2004
- Girls Soccer
  - State champion – 1996
- Softball
- Boys Track
- Girls Track
- Volleyball
- Wrestling
  - State team champion – 1982, 2007, 2008
  - State duel champion – 2006, 2008
  - Marching band -2025, 2026
