= Catoosa Springs, Georgia =

Unincorporated community in the state of Georgia

Coordinates: 34°54′50″N 85°03′20″W

Catoosa Springs is an unincorporated community in Catoosa County, in the U.S. state of Georgia.

== History ==
Catoosa Springs had its start in the 1840s as a destination mineral spa. A post office was established at Catoosa Springs in 1853, and remained in operation until it was discontinued in 1896.
