= 12th Missouri Infantry Regiment (Union) =

- Active: September 10, 1861, to October 1, 1864
- Country: United States
- Allegiance: Union
- Branch: Infantry
- Engagements: Fremont's Springfield Expedition; Battle of Pea Ridge; Yazoo Pass Expedition; Battle of Chickasaw Bayou; Battle of Chickasaw Bluffs; Battle of Fort Hindman; Battle of Mississippi Springs; Battle of Jackson; Siege of Vicksburg (Includes Assaults on 19 & 22 May 1863); Siege of Jackson; Battle of Bolton's Depot; Battle of Canton; Battle of Clinton, Mississippi; Battle of Cherokee Station battle of Cane Creek; Battle of Tuscumbia; Battle of Chattanooga; Battle of Lookout Mountain; Battle of Ringgold Gap; Battle of Taylor's Ridge; Relief of Knoxville; Battle of Resaca; Battle of Dallas; Battle of New Hope Church; Battle of Allatoona Hills; Battle of Brushy Mountain; Battle of Kennesaw Mountain; Battle of Nickajack Creek; Battle of the Chattahoochee River; Battle of Atlanta; Siege of Atlanta; Battle of Ezra Church; Battle of Lovejoy's Station; Pursuit of Hood

The 12th Missouri Infantry Regiment was an infantry regiment that served in the Union Army during the American Civil War. The regiment was organized by Colonel Peter J. Osterhaus, a veteran of the respected 2nd Missouri Volunteer Infantry (3 months, 1861). The majority of the soldiers in the 12th were ethnic Germans. This intermixed German-American unit also had a large portion of its ranks filled by volunteers from Illinois.

== Service ==
Organized at St. Louis, Missouri, August 1861.
Attached to Fremont's Army of the West to January 1862.
2nd Brigade, Army of Southwest Missouri, to February 1862.
2nd Brigade, 1st Division, Army of Southwest Missouri, to May 1862.
3rd Division, Army of Southwest Missouri, to July 1862.
District of Eastern Arkansas, Dept. of Missouri, to December 1862.
1st Brigade, 11th Division, Right Wing 13th Army Corps (Old), Dept. of the Tennessee, to December 1862.
2nd Brigade, 4th Division, Sherman's Yazoo Expedition, to January 1863.
2nd Brigade, 1st Division, to September 1863.
1st Brigade, 1st Division, 15th Army Corps, to December 1863.
3rd Brigade, 1st Division, 15th Army Corps, to November 1864.

== Detailed service ==
Fremont's advance on Springfield, Missouri, September to November 1861. Moved to Jefferson City, thence to Sedalia and Springfield.
To Wilson's Creek October 6–8. Duty at Rolla until January, 1862
Expedition to Danville December 26, 1861.
Curtis' Campaign in Missouri and Arkansas against Price January to March 1862.
Advance on Springfield February 2–16.
Pursuit of Price into Arkansas February 14–29.
Battles of Pea Ridge, Arkansas, March 6–8.
March to Batesville April 5-May 3; thence to Helena, Arkansas, May 25-July 14.
Expedition from Helena to mouth of White River August 5–8.
Moved to Ironton-Pilot Knob, Missouri, September 1.
To St. Genevieve November 12, and return to Helena November 23.
Sherman's Yazoo Expedition December 22, 1862, to January 3, 1863.
Chickasaw Bayou December 26–28.
Chickasaw Bluff December 29.
Expedition to Arkansas Post, Arkansas, January 3–10, 1863.
Assault and capture of Fort Hindman, Arkansas Post, January 10–11.
Moved to Young's Point, La., January 17–23. Duty there until March and at Milliken's Bend until April.
Expedition to Greenville, Black Bayou and Deer Creek April 2–14.
Demonstration on Haines and Drumgould's Bluffs April 29-May 2.
Moved to join army in rear of Vicksburg, Mississippi, via Richmond and Grand Gulf May 2–14.
Mississippi Springs May 12–13.
Jackson May 14. Siege of Vicksburg, Mississippi, May 18-July 4.
Assaults on Vicksburg May 19 and 22. Advance on Jackson, Mississippi, July 4–10.
Siege of Jackson July 10–17.
Bolton's Depot July 16.
Brier Creek, near Canton, July 17, Clinton July 18.
Camp at Big Black until September 27.
Moved to Memphis, Tennessee, thence march to Chattanooga, Tennessee, September 27-November 21.
Operations on Memphis & Charleston Railroad in Alabama October 20–29.
Cherokee Station October 21 and 29.
Cane Creek October 26. Tuscumbia October 26–27.
Battles of Chattanooga November 23–27.
Lookout Mountain November 23–24.
Mission Ridge November 25.
Ringgold Gap, Taylor's Ridge, November 27.
March to relief of Knoxville, November 28-December 8.
Garrison duty in Alabama at Woodville and Scottsboro, Alabama, and at Cleveland, Tennessee, to May 1864.
Atlanta (Georgia) Campaign May 1 to September 8.
Demonstration on Resaca May 8–13.
Battle of Resaca May 13–15.
Advance on Dallas May 18–25.
Battles about Dallas, New Hope Church and Allatoona Hills May 25-June 5.
Operations about Marietta and against Kenesaw Mountain June 10-July 2.
Bushy Mountain June 15–17.
Assault on Kenesaw June 27.
Nickajack Creek July 2–5.
Chattahoochie River July 6–17.
Battle of Atlanta July 22.
Siege of Atlanta July 22-August 25.
Ezra Chapel, Hood's 2nd Sortie, July 28.
Flank movement on Jonesboro August 25–30.
Lovejoy Station September 2–6.
Pursuit of Hood into Alabama October 1–21.
Mustered out by Companies from August 12 to November 14, 1864.
Consolidated with Detachments from 3rd and 17th Missouri Volunteer Infantry and subsequently transferred to 15th Missouri Infantry.

== Casualties ==
The regiment lost during service 10 officers and 102 enlisted men killed and mortally wounded and 2 officers and 94 enlisted men by disease. Total 208.

== Commanders ==
- Colonel Peter Joseph Osterhaus
- Lt. Col. Otto Schadt
- Maj. Hugo Aurelius von Wangelin

== See also ==
- Missouri Civil War Union units
- Missouri in the Civil War
