= Turkey Town Monument =

Confederate Memorial near Gadsden, Alabama, United States

Coordinates: 34°3.969′N 85°55.722′W

- Location: Gadsden, Alabama, United States
- Type: Sculpture
- Opening date: 1992

The Turkey Town Monument is an outdoor Confederate memorial installed near Gadsden, Alabama, in the United States. It was erected in 1992 by the Turkey Town Valley Camp 1512 Sons of Confederate Veterans. Inscriptions on the monument read:

The surrounding area and this well was part of Turkey’s Town, once a capital of the proud Cherokee Nation. Chief Turkey was the principal chief during the late 1700s. On October 25, 1864, the Turkey Town Valley Expedition of the XV Corps Union Army led by Major General Peter J. Osterhaus was stopped by the Confederate Cavalry led by Joseph Wheeler at this site. Total casualties: US 287 CS 92. May we never forget the men and women of Turkey Town Valley who labored and fought to preserve their southern heritage and freedom. This stone is then dedicated in their honor. Erected by Turkey Town Valley Camp 1512 Sons of Confederate Veterans.

== See also ==
- List of Confederate monuments and memorials
