= Peter Joseph Osterhaus =

German American general and diplomat (1823-1917)

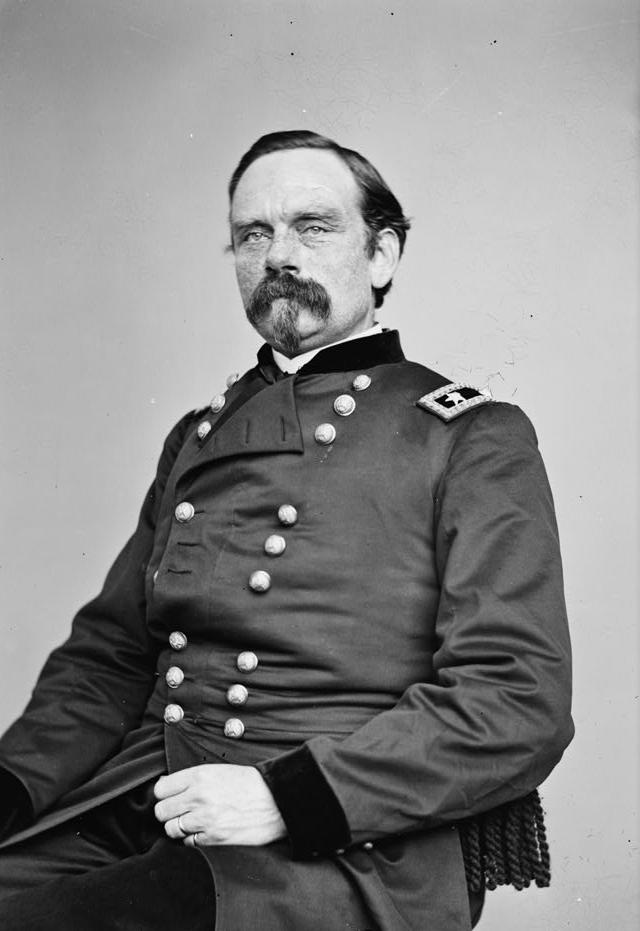
- Peter J. Osterhaus
- Born: January 4, 1823; Koblenz, Rhenish Prussia
- Died: January 2, 1917 (aged 93); Duisburg, German Empire
- Burial place: Koblenz Jewish Cemetery, Koblenz, Germany
- Military career
- Allegiance: Kingdom of Prussia; United States; Union
- Branch: Prussian Army; United States Army; Union Army
- Service years: 1861–1866
- Rank: Major General
- Commands: 12th Missouri Infantry Regiment; XV Corps
- Conflicts: German Revolution; American Civil War: Battle of Wilson's Creek; Battle of Pea Ridge; Battle of Champion Hill; Battle of Big Black River Bridge; Battle of Lookout Mountain; Battle of Ringgold Gap; Atlanta campaign Battle of Jonesborough; Sherman's March to the Sea

Peter Joseph Osterhaus (January 4, 1823 – January 2, 1917) was a German-American Union Army general in the American Civil War and later served as a diplomat.

== Early life ==
Osterhaus was born in Koblenz, Rhenish Prussia, the son of Eleanora (Kraemer) and Josef Adolf Oisterhusz. He attended the Berlin Military Academy and after serving for some time as a Prussian Army officer and finding himself on the losing side in the Revolutions of 1848, he immigrated to the United States in 1858 and settled in St. Louis, Missouri.

== Civil War ==
At the outbreak of the Civil War Osterhaus was appointed a major of the 2nd Missouri Infantry Regiment and during the first year of the war was employed in Missouri and Arkansas, where he took a conspicuous part in the Battle of Wilson's Creek and Battle of Pea Ridge. At Pea Ridge he commanded the troops that first made contact with Confederate forces advancing on the Union left. He was promoted to brigadier general on June 9, 1862. In 1863 he commanded a division in the Battle of Port Gibson, where he displayed tactical ability in prying Confederate defenders out of a favorable position.

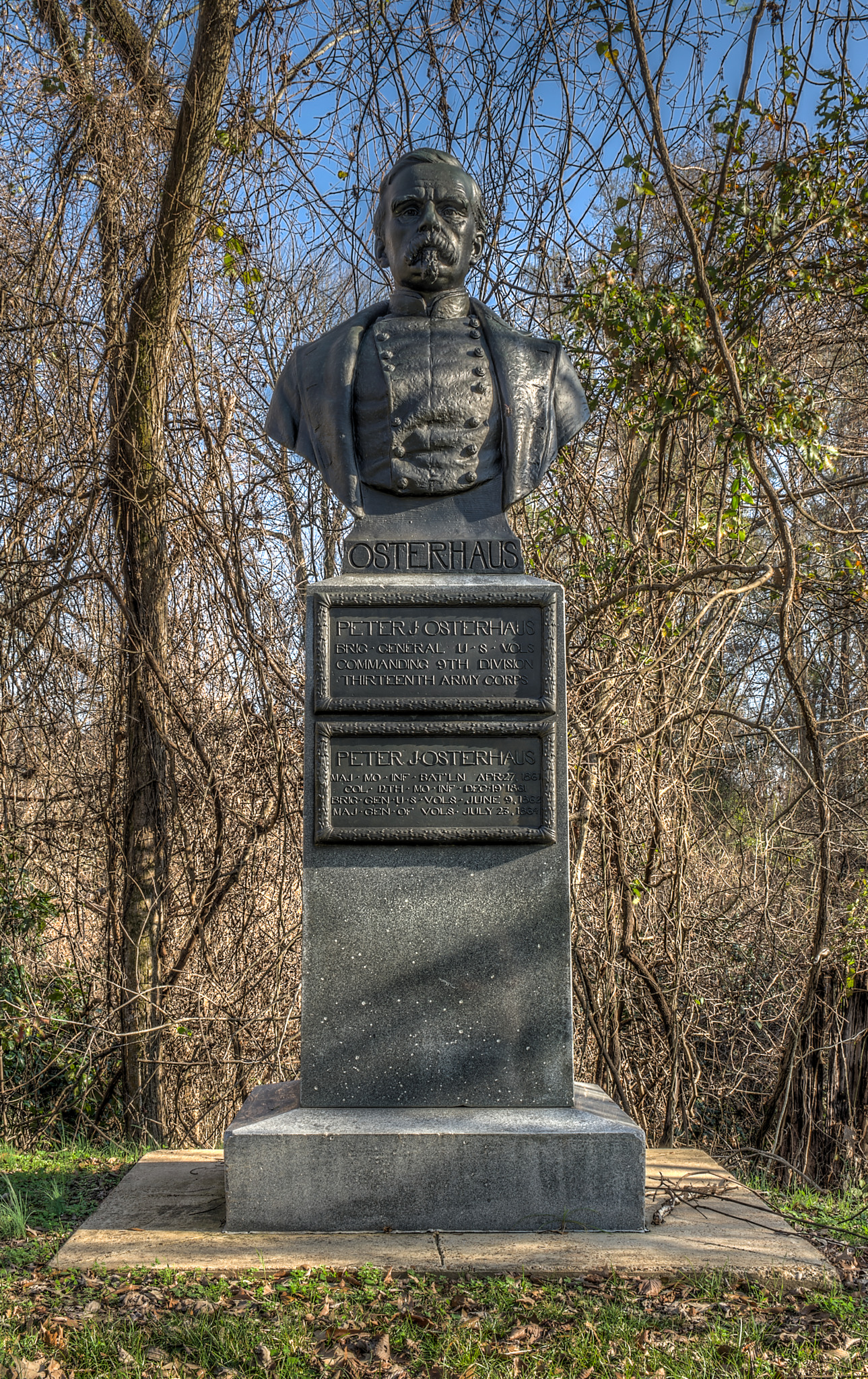
Bust of Osterhaus by T.A.R. Kitson at Vicksburg National Military Park

Osterhaus continued in division command during the Vicksburg Campaign, fighting in the Battle of Champion Hill and at the Battle of Big Black River Bridge, where he was slightly wounded. Osterhaus's division made an unsuccessful first attack on the defenses of Vicksburg, the first act of the Siege of Vicksburg. His division helped cover the siege against intervention by the Confederate forces of Gen. Joseph E. Johnston, and he took part in Maj. Gen. William T. Sherman's advance on Jackson, Mississippi, that was designed to protect the rear of the Army of the Tennessee in its siege operations.

After the fall of Vicksburg, Osterhaus's division was transferred to Tennessee. In the Chattanooga campaign he aided Maj. Gen. Joseph Hooker in the capture of Lookout Mountain. Osterhaus then participated in the Atlanta campaign but a month-long sick leave caused him to miss the crucial Battle of Atlanta. However, he returned to command and played a significant role in the Battle of Jonesborough. After the capture of Atlanta, he received command of the XV Corps, one of the four corps into which the army was consolidated, in the Sherman's March to the Sea. In March 1865 Osterhaus was appointed chief of staff in the Military Division of West Mississippi under the command of Maj. Gen. Edward Canby, a commander with little combat experience in high command. Osterhaus served Canby through the battles of Spanish Fort and Fort Blakeley. When Edmund Kirby Smith surrendered the Confederate forces in the Trans-Mississippi Theater, Osterhaus was sent as Canby's representative and therefore personally signed the documents on behalf of the Union army.

He was mustered out of the service on January 15, 1866, and the same year was appointed United States Consul at Lyon, France, but subsequently made his home in Germany, at Duisburg. He retired in 1905, and was in 1915 the oldest pensioner on the Army list.

Osterhaus died in Duisburg and was buried in Koblenz, Germany. Some thought he was buried at the Koblenz Jewish Cemetery, perhaps as a Carmen Osterhaus, born in the 1850s, had been listed as a Holocaust victim. However, the family vault was instead located at "Der Hauptfriedhof Koblenz" (the main cemetery, or city cemetery, of Koblenz). The crypt no longer exists. Ruined by terrain shifts in 1969, it was then abandoned. In 2012, a marker was erected at the old site, jointly funded by the city of Koblenz and Osterhaus descendants, including biographer Mary Bobbitt Townsend.

== Commemorations ==
Osterhaus is mentioned as losing a battle with Confederate cavalry led by Joseph Wheeler on the Turkey Town Monument near Gadsden, Alabama.

== See also ==
- List of American Civil War generals (Union)

== Sources ==
- Eicher, John H., and Eicher, David J., Civil War High Commands, Stanford University Press, 2001, ISBN 0-8047-3641-3.
- Townsend, Mary Bobbitt. Yankee Warhorse: A Biography of Major General Peter Osterhaus (University of Missouri Press; 2010) 288 pages; scholarly biography
- Woodworth, Steven E., Grant's Lieutenants, vol. 1: From Cairo to Vicksburg, Lawrence: University of Kansas Press, 2001.
