= Chattanooga campaign =

1863 series of battles of the American Civil War

- Part of the American Civil War
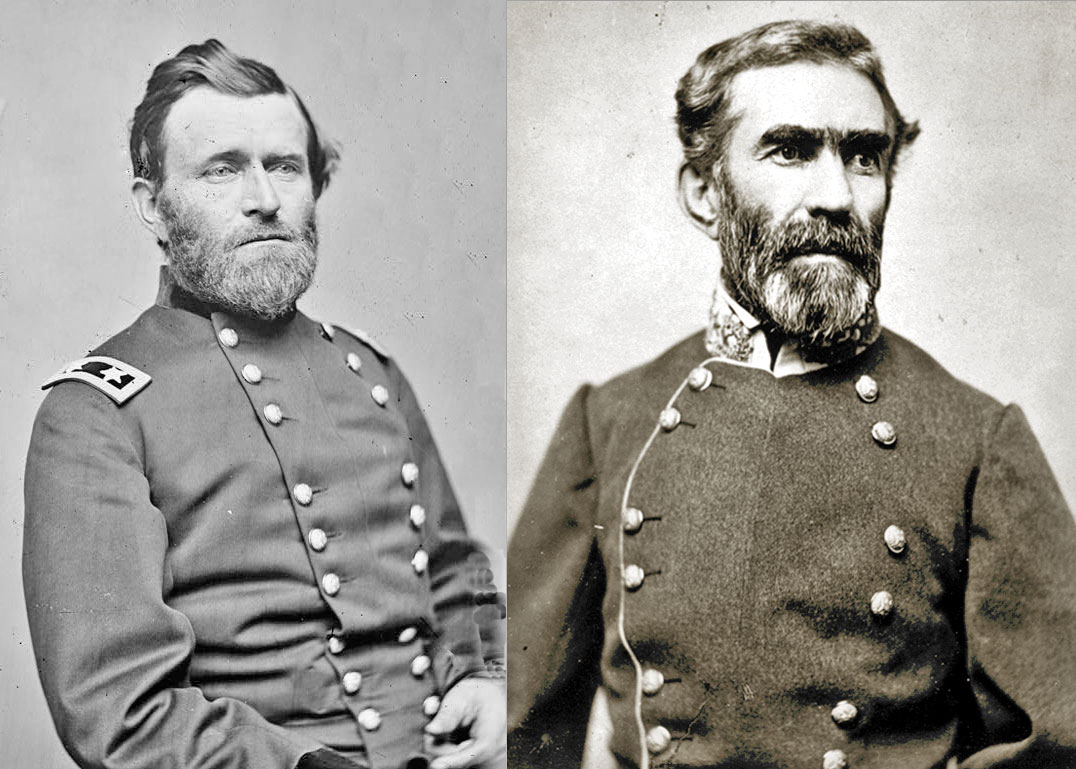
- Maj. Gen. Ulysses S. Grant and Gen. Braxton Bragg, commanding generals of the Chattanooga campaign
| Date | September 21 – November 25, 1863 (2 months and 4 days) |
| Location | Chattanooga, Tennessee 35.035°N 85.290°W |
| Result | Union victory |

Belligerents
| United States (Union) | Confederate States |

Commanders and leaders
| Ulysses S. Grant; William S. Rosecrans; George Henry Thomas; William Tecumseh Sherman; Joseph Hooker | Braxton Bragg; James Longstreet; John C. Breckinridge; William J. Hardee |

Units involved
| Military Division of the Mississippi | Army of Tennessee |

Strength
| 72,533 "present for duty equipped" | 48,948 "present for duty" |

Casualties and losses
| 5,824 total (753 killed 4,722 wounded 349 missing) | 6,000–8,000 (estimated) (8,684 men killed, wounded or prisoners) |

The Chattanooga campaign was a series of maneuvers and battles in October and November 1863, during the American Civil War. Following the defeat of Maj. Gen. William S. Rosecrans's Union Army of the Cumberland at the Battle of Chickamauga in September, the Confederate Army of Tennessee under Gen. Braxton Bragg besieged Rosecrans and his men by occupying key high terrain around Chattanooga, Tennessee. Maj. Gen. Ulysses S. Grant was given command of Union forces in the West which was now consolidated under the Division of the Mississippi. Significant reinforcements also began to arrive with him in Chattanooga from Mississippi and the eastern theater. On October 18, Grant removed Rosecrans from command of the Army of the Cumberland and replaced him with Major General George Henry Thomas.

During the opening of a supply line (the "Cracker Line") to feed the starving men and animals in Chattanooga, a force under Maj. Gen. Joseph Hooker fought off a Confederate counterattack at the Battle of Wauhatchie on October 28–29, 1863. On November 23, the Army of the Cumberland advanced from the fortifications around Chattanooga to seize the strategic high ground at Orchard Knob while elements of the Union Army of the Tennessee under Maj. Gen. William Tecumseh Sherman maneuvered to launch a surprise attack against Bragg's right flank on Missionary Ridge. On November 24, Sherman's men crossed the Tennessee River in the morning and then advanced to occupy high ground at the northern end of Missionary Ridge in the afternoon. The same day, a mixed force of almost three divisions under Maj. Gen. Joseph Hooker defeated the Confederates in the Battle of Lookout Mountain. The next day they began a movement toward Bragg's left flank at Rossville.

On November 25, Sherman's attack on Bragg's right flank made little progress. To distract Bragg's attention, Grant ordered Thomas's army to advance through the center and seize the Confederate positions at the base of Missionary Ridge. The untenability of these newly captured entrenchments caused Thomas's men to surge to the top of Missionary Ridge and, with the help of Hooker's force advancing north from Rossville, rout the Confederate Army of Tennessee. The Confederates retreated to Dalton, Georgia, successfully fighting off the Union pursuit at the Battle of Ringgold Gap. Bragg's defeat eliminated the last significant Confederate control of Tennessee and opened the door to an invasion of the Deep South, leading to Sherman's Atlanta campaign of 1864.

== Background ==
=== Military situation ===
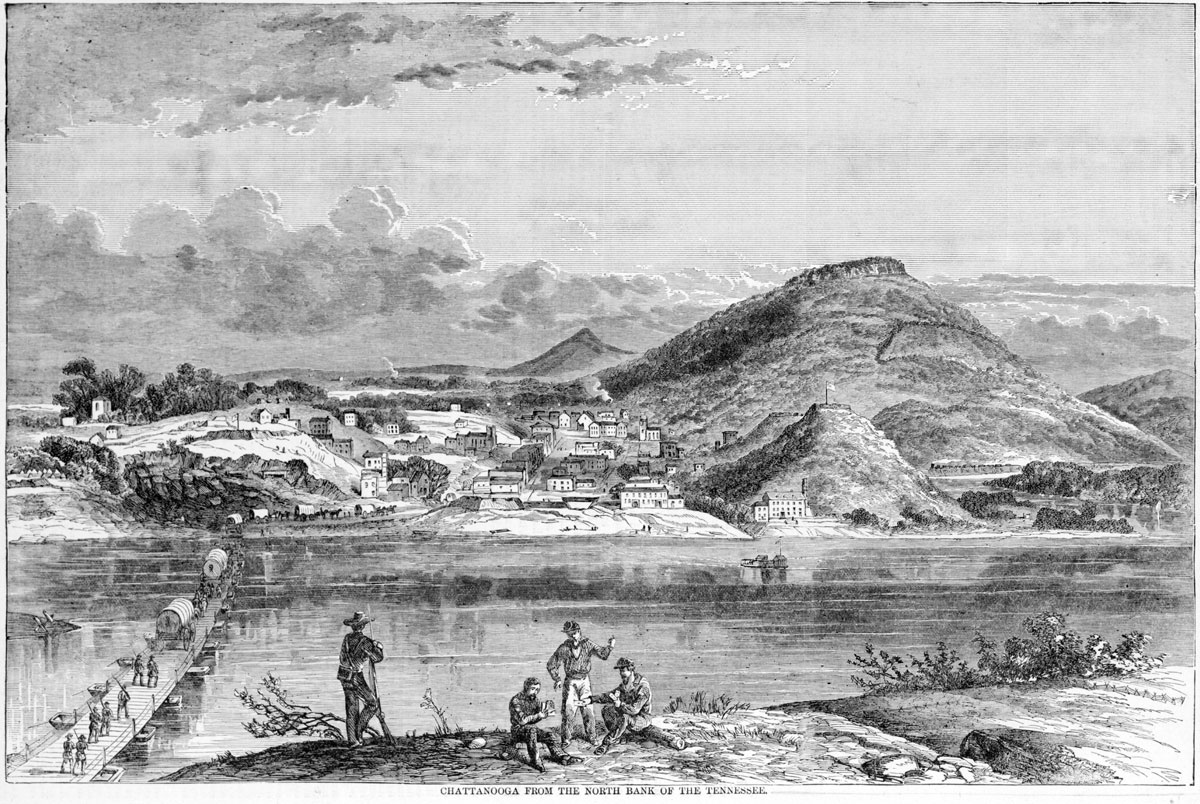
Chattanooga viewed from the north bank of the Tennessee River, 1863. The Union Army pontoon bridge is shown on the left, Lookout Mountain at the right rear. The small hill in front of Lookout Mountain is Cameron Hill, which was significantly flattened during 20th century development of the city.

Federal supply lines and Wheeler's October 1863 raid Confederate Union

Federal supply lines before and after opening Grant's Cracker Line

Chattanooga was a vital rail hub (with lines going north toward Nashville and Knoxville and south toward Atlanta), and an important manufacturing center for the production of iron and coal, located on the navigable Tennessee River. In September 1863, the Union Army of the Cumberland under Maj. Gen. William S. Rosecrans executed a series of maneuvers that forced Confederate Gen. Braxton Bragg and his Army of Tennessee to abandon Chattanooga and withdraw into northern Georgia. Rosecrans pursued Bragg and the two armies collided at the Battle of Chickamauga on September 19–20. Bragg achieved a major victory when a gap was opened mistakenly in the Union line and a strong assaulting force commanded by Lt. Gen. James Longstreet serendipitously drove through it and routed a good portion of the Union army. A determined defensive stand by Maj. Gen. George H. Thomas on Snodgrass Hill saved the army from total destruction, earning him the nickname "Rock of Chickamauga" and allowing time for most of Rosecrans's army to retreat to Chattanooga. Bragg failed to cut off the escape routes to Chattanooga or organize a pursuit that could have seriously damaged the Union army before it regrouped and fortified the city's defenses. The Union forces took advantage of previous Confederate works to erect strong defensive positions in a tight, 3-mile-long semicircle around the city.

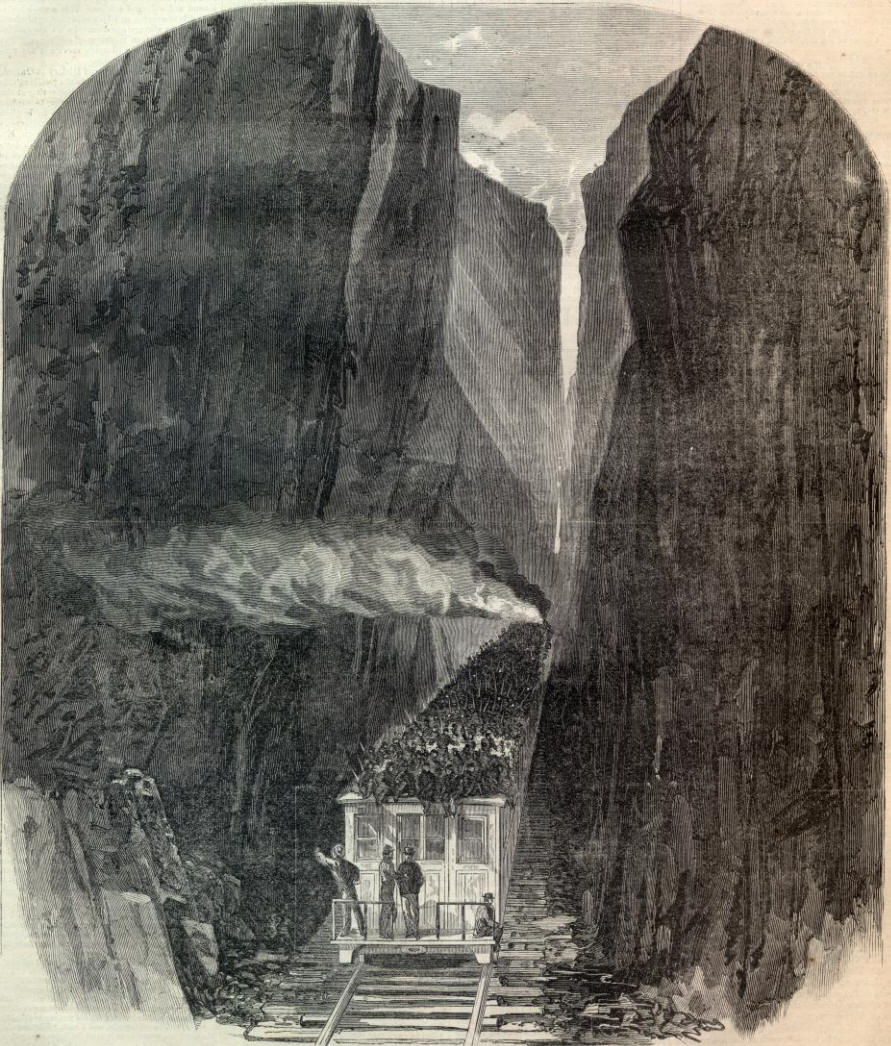
Union reinforcements, destined for the Army of the Cumberland, being moved by train through Louisville–Nashville to Chattanooga, October 1863 as part of the preparation for operations against Confederate forces based around Chattanooga.

Bragg had three courses of action. The Union forces repurposed existing Confederate fortifications to build strong defensive positions, forming a tight, three-mile-long semicircle around the city. The flanking option was deemed to be impracticable because Bragg's army was short on ammunition, they had no pontoons for river crossing, and Longstreet's corps from Virginia had arrived at Chickamauga without wagons. A direct assault was too costly against a well-fortified enemy. Receiving intelligence that Rosecrans's men had only six days of rations, Bragg chose the siege option, while attempting to accumulate sufficient logistical capability to cross the Tennessee.

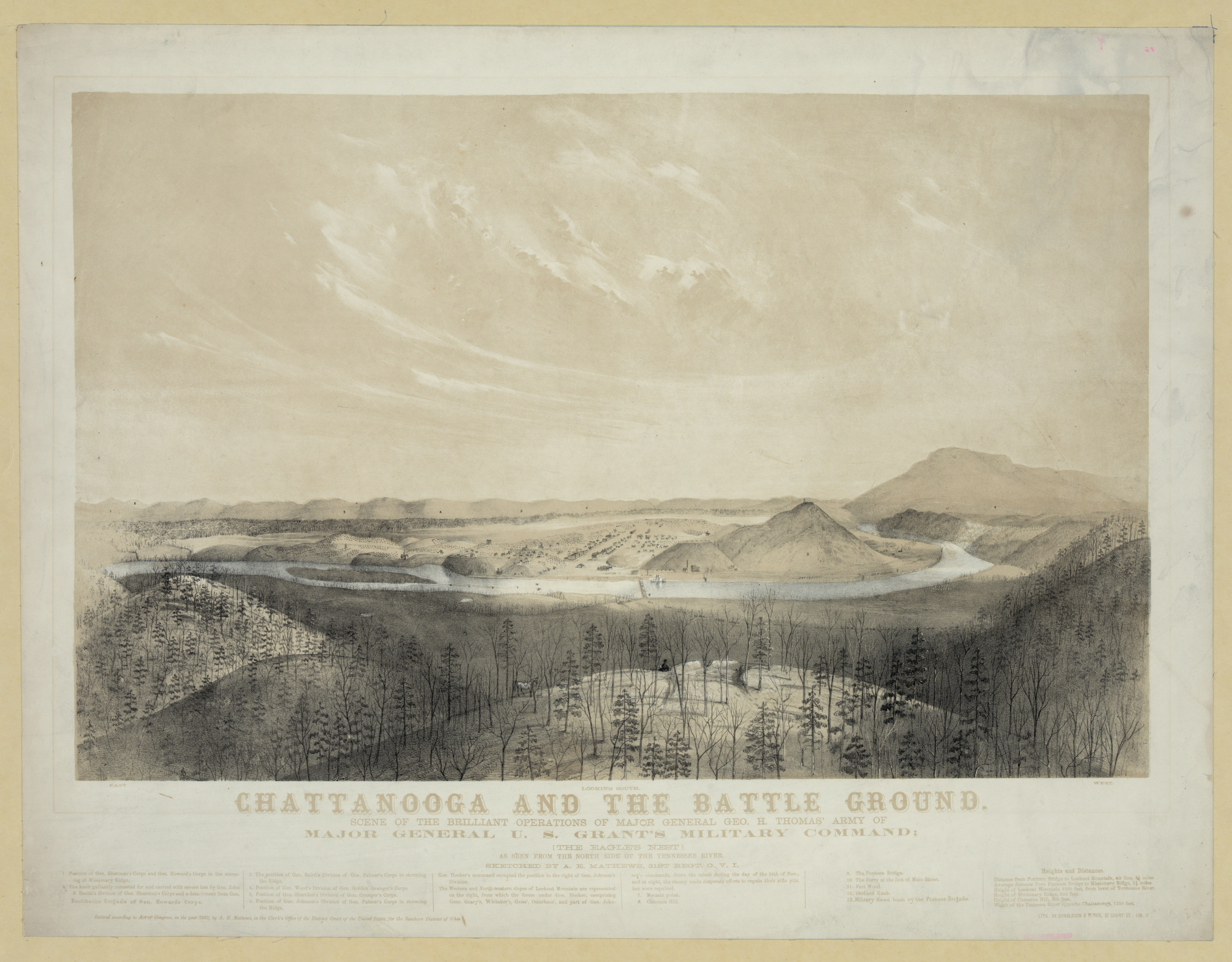
View of Chattanooga from the northern side of the Tennessee, looking southwards towards Georgia, showing the town in the foreground across the river. On the left in the distance is Missionary ridge along the horizon. In the distance to the right is Lookout Mountain. These natural formations offered excellent defensive positions, and bottled the Union army in Chattanooga.

Bragg's army besieged the city, threatening to starve the Union forces into surrender. The Confederates established themselves on Missionary Ridge and Lookout Mountain, both of which had excellent views of the city, the Tennessee River flowing north of the city, and the Union's supply lines. Bragg also had little inclination to take offensive action against the Federal army because he was occupied in leadership quarrels within his army. On September 29, Bragg relieved from command two of his subordinates who had disappointed him in the Chickamauga campaign: Maj. Gen. Thomas C. Hindman (who had failed to destroy part of the Union army at McLemore's Cove) and Lt. Gen. Leonidas Polk (who had delayed attacking on September 20 at Chickamauga). On October 4, twelve of his most senior generals sent a petition to Confederate President Jefferson Davis, demanding that Bragg be relieved of command. Davis personally visited Chattanooga to hear the complaints. After he decided to retain Bragg in command, Bragg retaliated against some of those generals by relieving Lt. Gen. D.H. Hill and Maj. Gen. Simon B. Buckner.

Never in the history of the Army of the Cumberland had the spirit of its officers and men been more depressed. The battle of Chickamauga had not only been fought and lost, but we also lost what was more than losing the battle. We had lost confidence in our commander.

— Capt. George Lewis, 124th Ohio

In Chattanooga, Rosecrans was stunned by the defeat of his army and became psychologically unable to take decisive action to lift the siege. President Abraham Lincoln remarked that Rosecrans seemed "confused and stunned like a duck hit on the head." Union soldiers began to feel the effect of extremely short rations and many of their horses and mules died. The only supply line that was not controlled by the Confederates was a roundabout, tortuous course nearly 60 miles long over Walden's Ridge from Bridgeport, Alabama. Heavy rains began to fall in late September, washing away long stretches of the mountain roads. On October 1, Maj. Gen. Joseph Wheeler's Confederate cavalry intercepted and severely damaged a train of 800 wagons—burning hundreds of the wagons, and shooting or sabering hundreds of mules—at the start of his October 1863 Raid through Tennessee to sever Rosecrans's supply line. Toward the end of October, typical Federal soldiers' rations were "four cakes of hard bread and a quarter pound of pork" every three days.

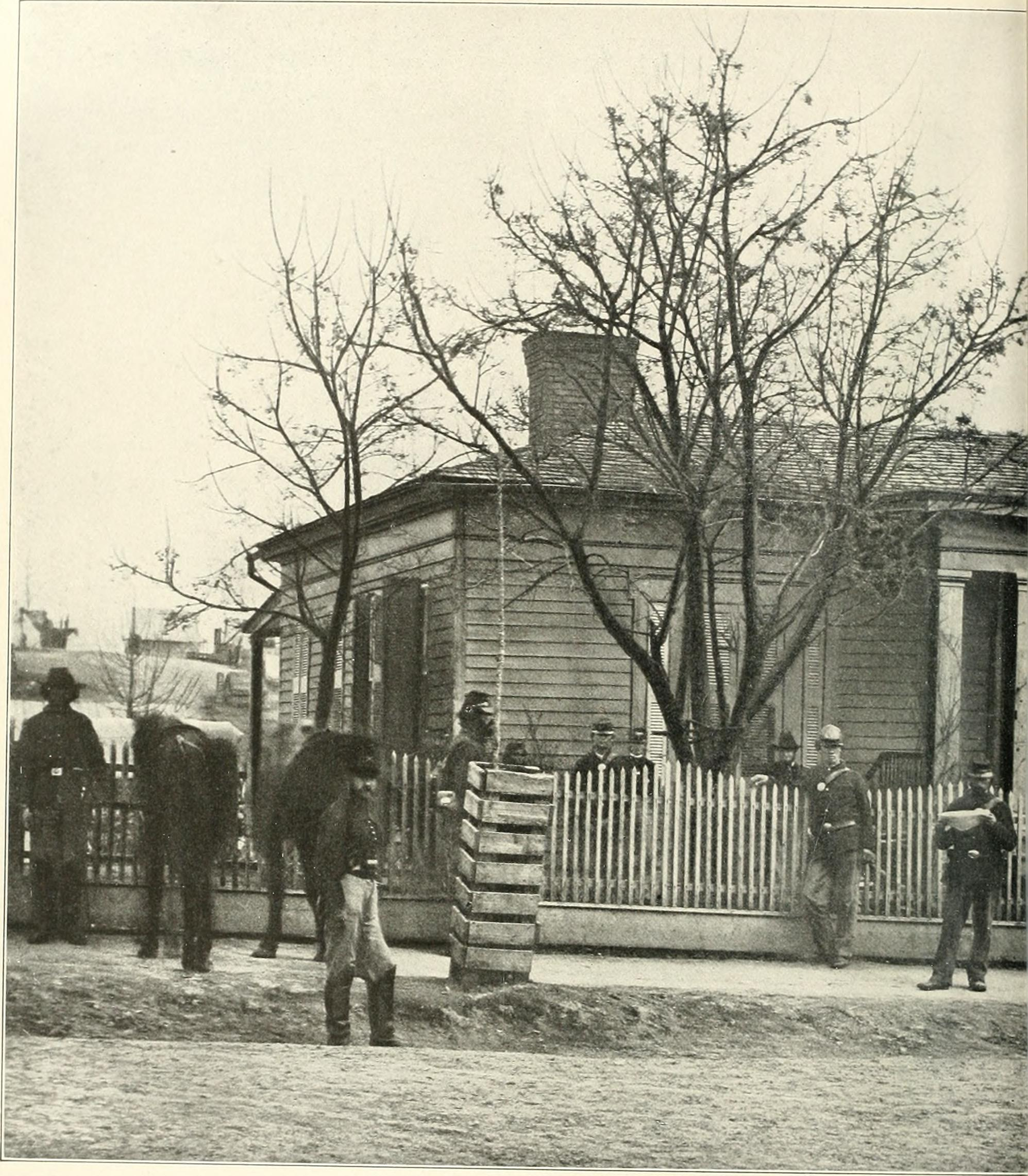
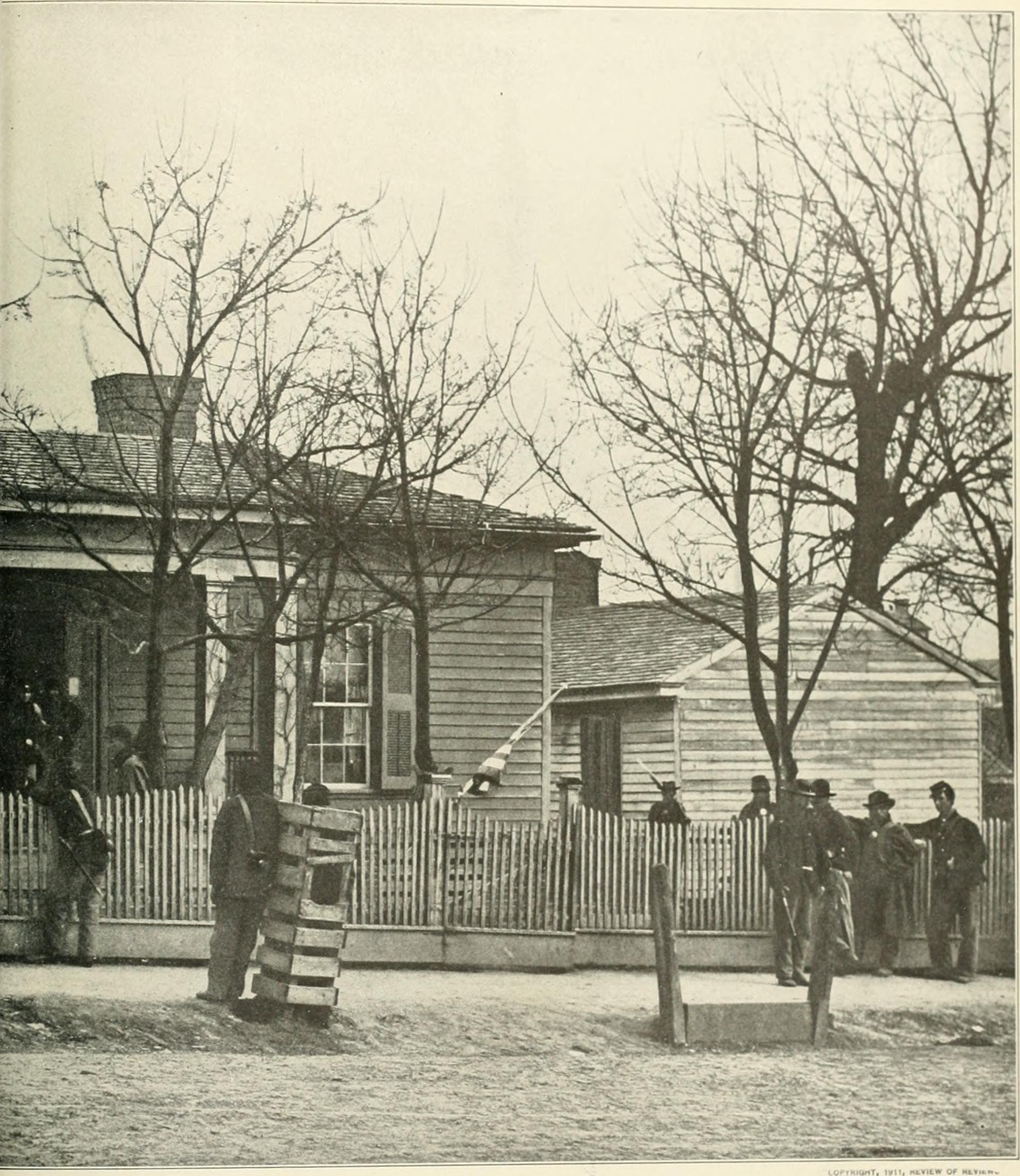
Grant and Thomas headquarters, October 23.

The Union high command began immediate preparations to relieve the city. Only hours after the defeat at Chickamauga, Secretary of War Edwin M. Stanton ordered Maj. Gen. Joseph Hooker to Chattanooga with 20,000 men in two small corps from the Army of the Potomac in Virginia. Even before the Union defeat, Maj. Gen. Ulysses S. Grant had been ordered to send his available force to assist Rosecrans, and it departed under his chief subordinate, Maj. Gen. William T. Sherman, from Vicksburg, Mississippi. On September 29, Stanton ordered Grant to go to Chattanooga himself, as commander of the newly created Military Division of the Mississippi, bringing the territory from the Appalachian Mountains to the Mississippi River (and much of the state of Arkansas) under a single commander for the first time. Grant was given the option of replacing the demoralized Rosecrans with Thomas. Although Grant did not have good personal relations with Thomas, he had previously determined that he "could not make [Rosecrans] do as I wished" in the capacity as a subordinate. Grant selected Thomas to command the Army of the Cumberland. Hearing an inaccurate report that Rosecrans had been preparing to abandon Chattanooga, Grant telegraphed to Thomas, "Hold Chattanooga at all hazards. I will be there as soon as possible." The Rock of Chickamauga replied immediately, "I will hold the town till we starve." Grant traveled over the treacherous mountain supply line roads and arrived in Chattanooga on October 23.

=== Reopening the Tennessee River ===
==== Opening the Cracker Line ====
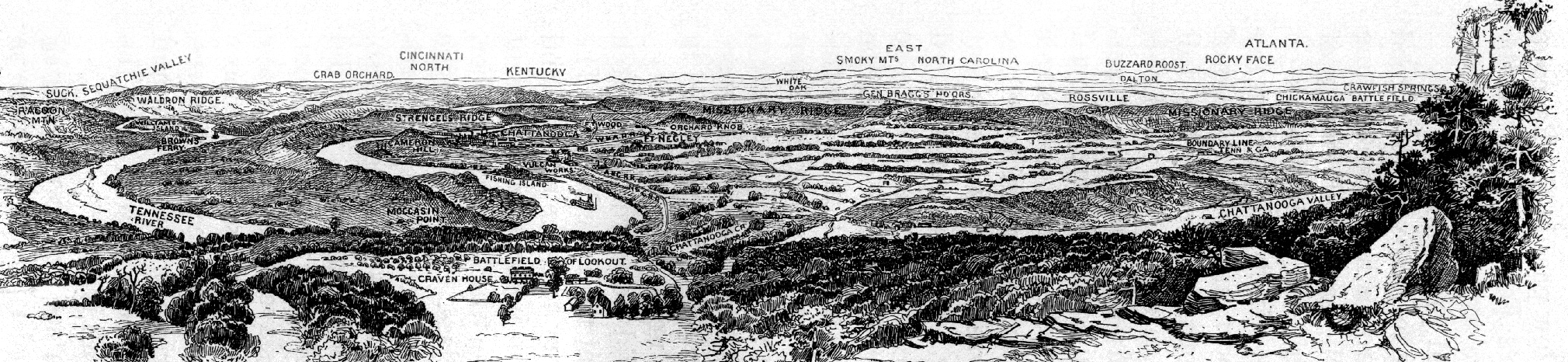
Engraving of the view north from Point Lookout on Lookout Mountain over the Chattanooga region, from Battles and Leaders, 1885

The chief engineer of the Army of the Cumberland, Brig. Gen. William F. "Baldy" Smith, had devised a plan with Rosecrans to open a more reliable supply line to the troops in Chattanooga. General Thomas put the plan afoot immediately upon taking command. Smith briefed Grant immediately after the new commander's arrival and Grant enthusiastically concurred with the plan. Brown's Ferry crossed the Tennessee River from Moccasin Point where the road followed a gap through the foothills, turned south through Lookout Valley to Wauhatchie Station, and then west to Kelley's Ferry, a navigable point on the Tennessee that could be reached by Union supply boats. If the Army of the Cumberland could seize Brown's Ferry and link up with Hooker's force arriving from Bridgeport, Alabama, through Lookout Valley, a reliable, efficient supply line—soon to become known as the "Cracker Line"—would be open. In addition, a force at Brown's Ferry would threaten the right flank of any Confederate movement into the valley.

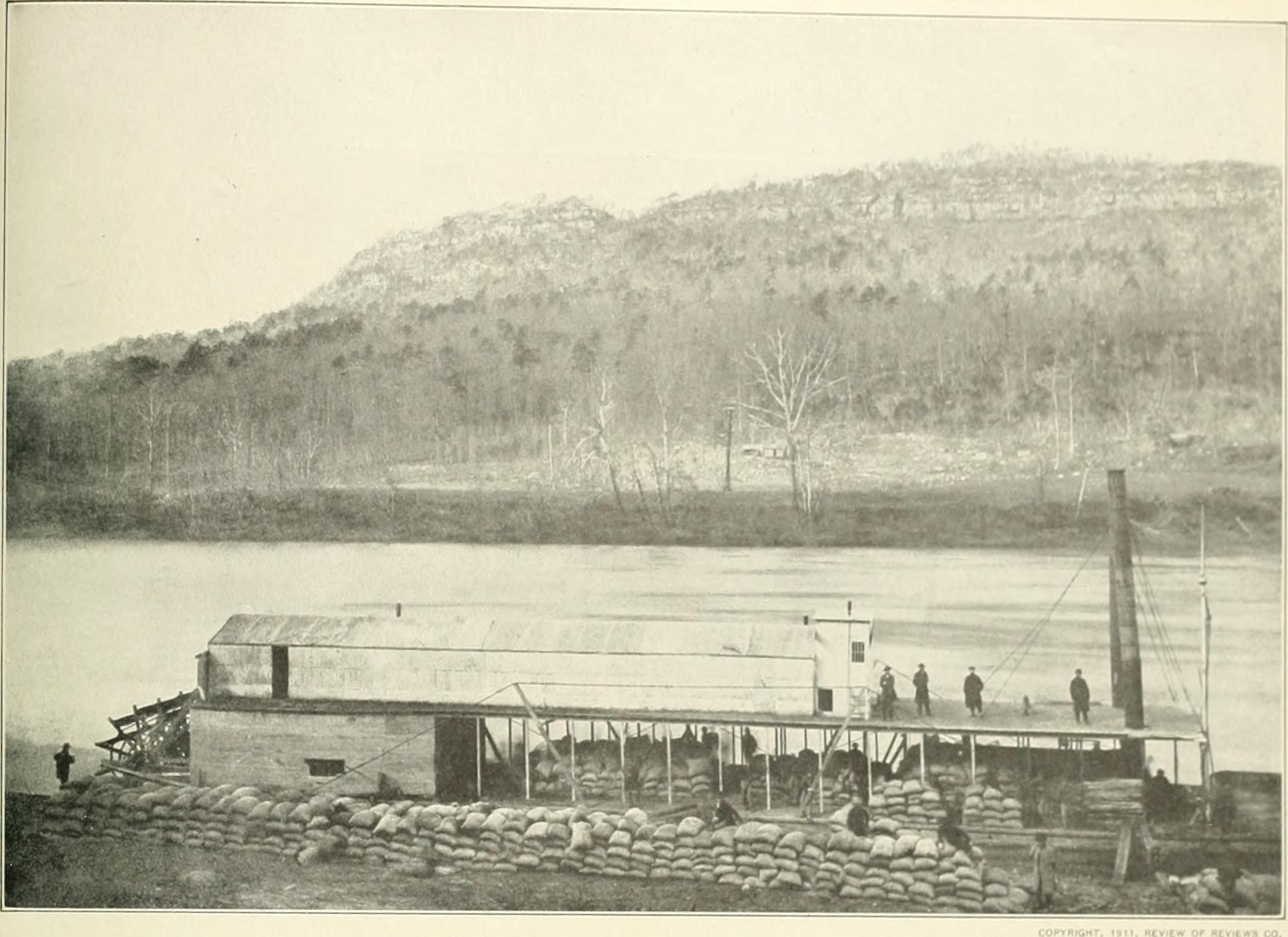
USS Chattanooga, Cracker Liner

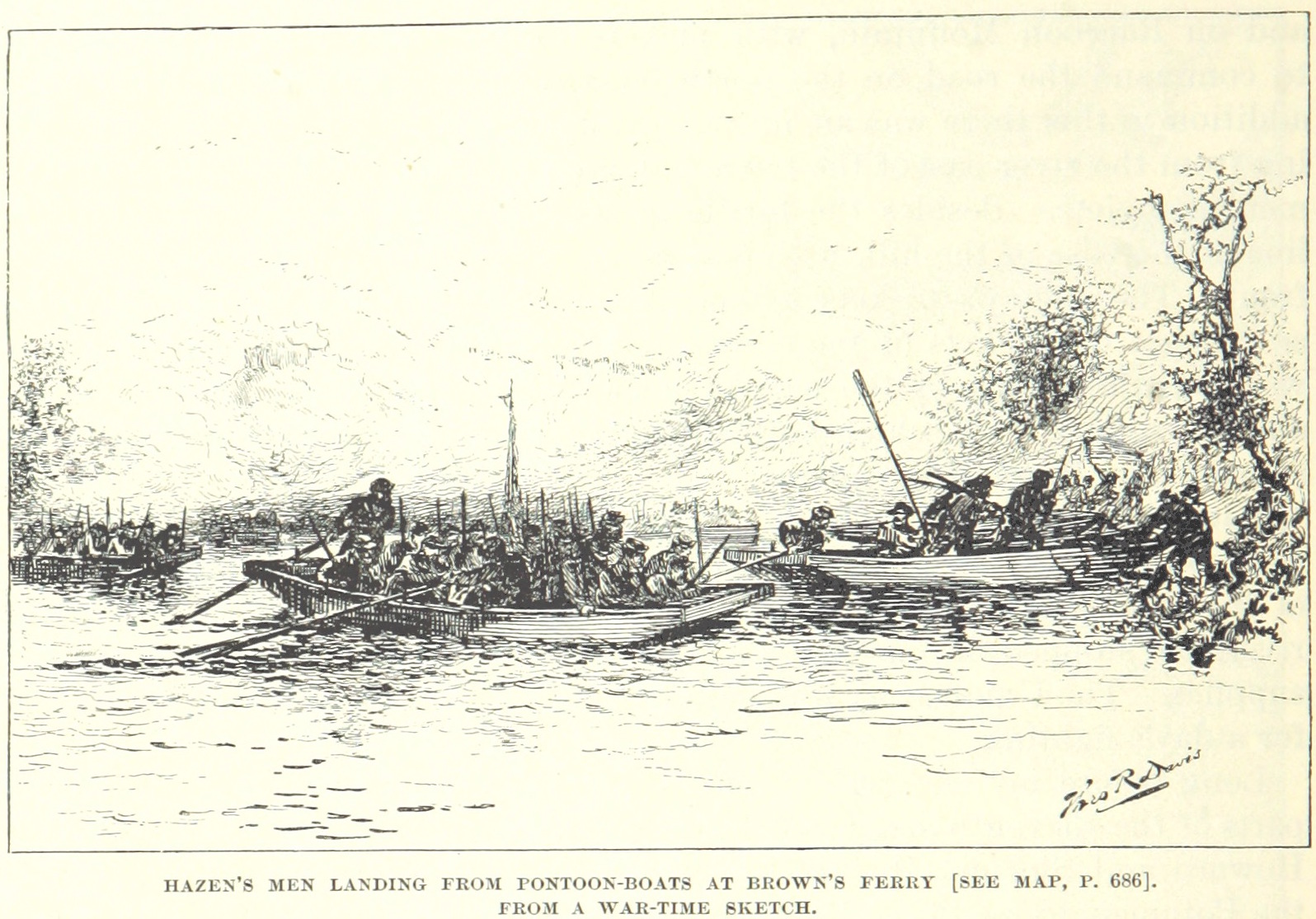
Hazen's men land at Brown's Ferry

Hooker left Maj. Gen. Henry W. Slocum with one of his divisions of the XII Corps to guard the railroad line from Murfreesboro to Bridgeport. Slocum's remaining division, under Brig. Gen. John W. Geary, and the two divisions of Maj. Gen. Oliver O. Howard's XI Corps were ordered to move quickly to Lookout Valley. However, weather conditions delayed the movement, so Grant decided to move ahead with the Brown's Ferry operation even before Hooker could arrive. Smith's plan for the assault on Brown's Ferry was to send most of one brigade (Brig. Gen. William B. Hazen's) traveling stealthily downriver on pontoons and a raft at night to capture the gap and hills on the west bank of the Tennessee while a second brigade (Brig. Gen. John B. Turchin's) marched across Moccasin Point in support.

Braxton Bragg had no idea that this operation was being planned, but he was aware of Hooker's pending river crossing at Bridgeport, so was concerned about his left flank. He ordered Longstreet to move additional units into Lookout Valley, but, unknown to Bragg, the order was ignored. Furthermore, Longstreet's lack of diligence allowed command mixups to leave only two regiments near Brown's Ferry.

Early on the morning of October 27, Hazen's men floated unnoticed past the Confederate position on Lookout Mountain, aided by low fog and no moonlight. They were able to seize the ground above Brown's Ferry by 4:40 a.m. A counterattack by the 15th Alabama Infantry, commanded by Col. William C. Oates (of Little Round Top fame) was repulsed and Oates was wounded. Oates's brigade commander, Brig. Gen. Evander M. Law, placed his brigade blocking the road over Lookout Mountain and reported the Union success to Longstreet. Longstreet dismissed the importance of the report, considering the Union move to be only a feint, and did not bother passing the information on to Bragg. When Bragg learned of it, he ordered Longstreet to retake the ground immediately, but Longstreet once again did nothing and Smith's men spent the day consolidating their bridgehead without interference.

Hooker's column marched through Lookout Valley and linked up with Hazen and Turchin at Brown's Ferry at 3:45 p.m., October 28. Thomas's staff began the preparations to bring supplies over the Cracker Line and he telegraphed General in Chief Henry W. Halleck that he expected "in a few days to be pretty well supplied."

==== Wauhatchie ====
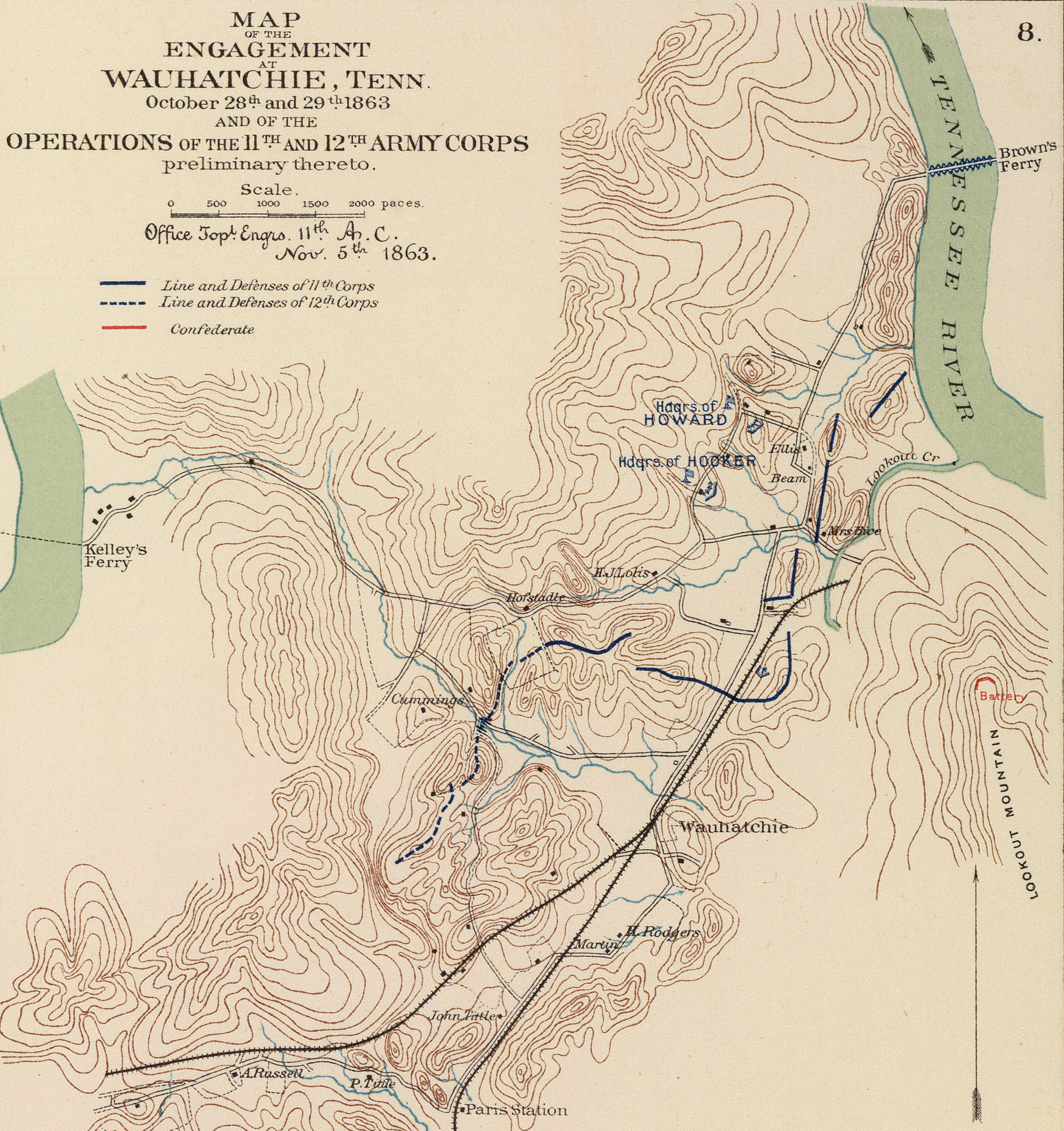
Battle of Wauhatchie

Having ignored several direct orders from Bragg to attack Brown's Ferry, Longstreet was ordered by Bragg to attack Hooker's concentration at Wauhatchie instead. There, Hooker had neglected to arrange his force into effective defensive positions, instructing them merely to find good cover for the troops and bivouac. He detached Brig. Gen. John W. Geary's division at Wauhatchie Station, a stop on the Nashville and Chattanooga Railroad, to protect the line of communications to the south as well as the road west to Kelley's Ferry. Longstreet was amazed to see Geary's bivouacking soldiers with their large wagon train parked directly in front of him.

Longstreet ordered a night attack, a relatively rare occurrence in the Civil War, using only the brigade of Brig. Gen. Evander M. Law and Brig. Gen. Micah Jenkins's division from Lookout Mountain, far fewer troops than Bragg had authorized. The attack was scheduled for 10:00 p.m. on October 28, but confusion delayed it until midnight. Although Geary and his officers expected an attack and had thrown out pickets, its suddenness took them by surprise. Enveloped from the north by Col. John Bratton's brigade, the Union defenders formed into a V-shaped battle line, facing north and east. Geary's son Edward, an artillery lieutenant, was killed in the battle, dying in his father's arms.

Hearing the sounds of battle, Hooker, at Brown's Ferry, sent Maj. Gen. Oliver O. Howard with two XI Corps divisions as reinforcements. Orders of march were confused and delayed the movement. Hooker mistakenly deployed units from both XI Corps divisions against Law's and Brig. Gen. Henry L. Benning's brigades, leaving no one to go to Geary's aid. Law's 2,000 men were greatly outnumbered by Hooker's men, but the hilltop position was naturally strong and several vigorous Union assaults were repulsed.

Receiving an erroneous report that Bratton was retreating, Law decided to pull back. Just as his men left their entrenchments, Col. Orland Smith's brigade (Brig. Gen. Adolph von Steinwehr's division) spilled over them, capturing some stragglers and scattering a regiment that failed to get the order to retreat. Meanwhile, Hooker agreed to let Howard proceed to Wauhatchie with some cavalry. Geary's men continued to hold fast, although they began to run low on ammunition. Just as Bratton began to sense victory, he received a note from Jenkins to retreat because Union reinforcements were arriving at his rear. He withdrew to Lookout Mountain, successfully covered by Benning's brigade.

Both sides had planned poorly for the battle. Hooker's carelessness in placing his men had left them at risk. Grant was disgusted at Hooker's performance and considered relieving him. Longstreet committed too few men for an assault of this importance and Bragg was also disgusted with his subordinate. Bragg's biographer, Judith L. Hallock, wrote that Wauhatchie was, for Longstreet, an "ill-conceived, ill-planned, and poorly coordinated attack" that "resulted in a shambles."

==== Longstreet departs ====
Bragg had committed the most egregious error of his checkered career. In all too typical fashion, he had allowed rancor to crowd out rational thought. Without a coherent plan or even the desire for close coordination between the two segments, he had divided his army in the face of a now numerically superior foe who was about to receive even more reinforcements.

— The view of Peter Cozzens, The Shipwreck of Their Hopes

The opening of the cracker line changed the strategic situation completely. Bragg knew the siege was effectively broken. Considering his options—retreating from the area; assaulting the Union fortifications at Chattanooga; waiting for Grant to attack; attempting to move around Grant's right flank; attempting to move around Grant's left flank—Bragg realized that movement around Grant's left flank was the only promising option. It could allow him to re-establish a badly needed rail supply line to Virginia via Knoxville and unite with about 10,000 men in southwestern Virginia under Maj. Gen. Samuel Jones. An impediment to this plan was the operation of Maj. Gen. Ambrose Burnside's Union Army of the Ohio, currently occupying Knoxville and blocking the railroad. On October 17, Bragg had ordered the division of Maj. Gen. Carter L. Stevenson and two cavalry brigades to extend his right flank toward Knoxville. On October 22, Bragg added the division of Brig. Gen. John K. Jackson to the expedition, bringing the total to about 11,000 men, and considered sending Stevenson's corps commander, John C. Breckinridge, as well. In early November, Bragg ordered additional reinforcements and changed the orders from simply extending the right flank to actually pushing Burnside away from Knoxville and reestablishing communications with Virginia.

But events in Virginia caused Bragg to change his plan. Responding to a suggestion from President Davis, Bragg announced in a council of war on November 3 that he was sending Longstreet and his two divisions into East Tennessee to deal with Burnside, replacing the Stevenson/Jackson force. Davis had suggested Longstreet for this assignment because he intended Longstreet's divisions to return to the Army of Northern Virginia at the end of the campaign and Knoxville was on the route back to Virginia. In the face of a rapidly expanding enemy force, Bragg chose to divide his army and decrease his net defensive force by about 4,000 men (less than 10%) in order to facilitate the move on Knoxville. Campaign historian Steven E. Woodworth judged, however, that "even the flat loss of the number of good soldiers in Longstreet's divisions would have been a gain to the army in ridding it of their general's feuding and blundering."

=== Preparations for battle ===
Grant had two weeks following Wauhatchie before Sherman was to arrive, and he charged Thomas and Smith with the responsibility for planning an assault against Bragg, starting with an attack by Sherman on the Confederate right flank, emphasizing that he would not approve the plan until Sherman had an opportunity to review it. After considerable reconnaissance the two generals presented their plan on November 14. Sherman's arriving troops would use newly improved roads to pass through the hills north of Chattanooga, taking a route that was not visible from Lookout Mountain, hoping that Bragg would not know for certain whether Sherman was targeting Chattanooga or Knoxville. Smith would assemble every available boat and pontoon to allow Sherman's corps to cross the Tennessee River near the mouth of the South Chickamauga Creek and attack Bragg's right flank on Missionary Ridge. If the attack were successful, the Union would control the two key railroad lines that supplied Bragg's army, forcing him to withdraw. Thomas's army would simultaneously pin down the Confederate center on Missionary Ridge. The plan also called for Hooker to assault and seize Lookout Mountain, Bragg's left flank, and continue on to Rossville, where he would be positioned to cut off a potential Confederate retreat to the south.

Sherman arrived ahead of his troops on the evening of November 15. He observed the end of Missionary Ridge that he was designated to attack and remarked that he could seize it successfully by 9 a.m. on the assigned day. Grant approved Thomas's and Smith's plan, although he withdrew support for the attack by Hooker on Lookout Mountain, intending the mass of his attack to be by Sherman. Sherman's men were still a considerable distance from Chattanooga because they had been under orders from Halleck to repair the railroad as they marched the 330 miles from Vicksburg (an order countermanded by Grant on October 27) and their commander had ignored advice from Thomas that he march rapidly without the impediment of his trains, as Hooker had done. Although Grant had hoped to begin offensive operations on November 21, by November 20 only one of Sherman's brigades had crossed over Brown's Ferry and the attack had to be postponed. Grant was coming under pressure from Washington to react to Longstreet's advance against Burnside at Knoxville.

Bragg, having dispatched most of his cavalry, had little means of gathering intelligence. He assumed that Sherman's corps would be heading toward his department's extreme right flank at Knoxville, not Chattanooga. Therefore, he believed that the main Union assault would occur on his left flank, Lookout Mountain. On November 12, Bragg placed Carter Stevenson in overall command for the defense of the mountain, with Stevenson's division placed on the summit. The brigades of Brig. Gens. John K. Jackson, Edward C. Walthall, and John C. Moore were placed on the "bench" of the mountain (a narrow and relatively flat shelf that wrapped around the northern end of the mountain approximately halfway to the summit). Jackson later wrote about the dissatisfaction of the commanders assigned to this area, "Indeed, it was agreed on all hands that the position was one extremely difficult to defense against a strong force of the enemy advancing under cover of a heavy fire." Thomas L. Connelly, historian of the Army of Tennessee, wrote that despite the imposing appearance of Lookout Mountain, "the mountain's strength was a myth. ... It was impossible to hold [the bench, which] was commanded by Federal artillery at Moccasin Bend." Although Stevenson placed an artillery battery on the crest of the mountain, the guns could not be depressed enough to reach the bench, which was accessible from numerous trails on the west side of the mountain.

Dissatisfaction also prevailed in the Chattanooga Valley and on Missionary Ridge, where Breckinridge, commanding Bragg's center and right, had only 16,000 men to defend a line 5 miles long. Brig. Gen. Patton Anderson, whose division was assigned to the Confederate works along the western base of the ridge, wrote "This line of defense, following its sinuosities, was over two miles in length—nearly twice as long as a number of bayonets in the division could adequately defend." Bragg exacerbated the situation on November 22 by ordering Maj. Gen. Patrick R. Cleburne to withdraw his and Simon B. Buckner's divisions from the line and march to Chickamauga Station, for railroad transport to Knoxville, removing 11,000 more men from the defense of Chattanooga. This move was apparently made because, as Grant had hoped, Bragg concluded that Sherman's troops were moving on to Knoxville, in which case Longstreet would need the reinforcements, for which he had been constantly clamoring since he was first given the assignment.

== Opposing forces ==
=== Union ===
Union subordinate commanders
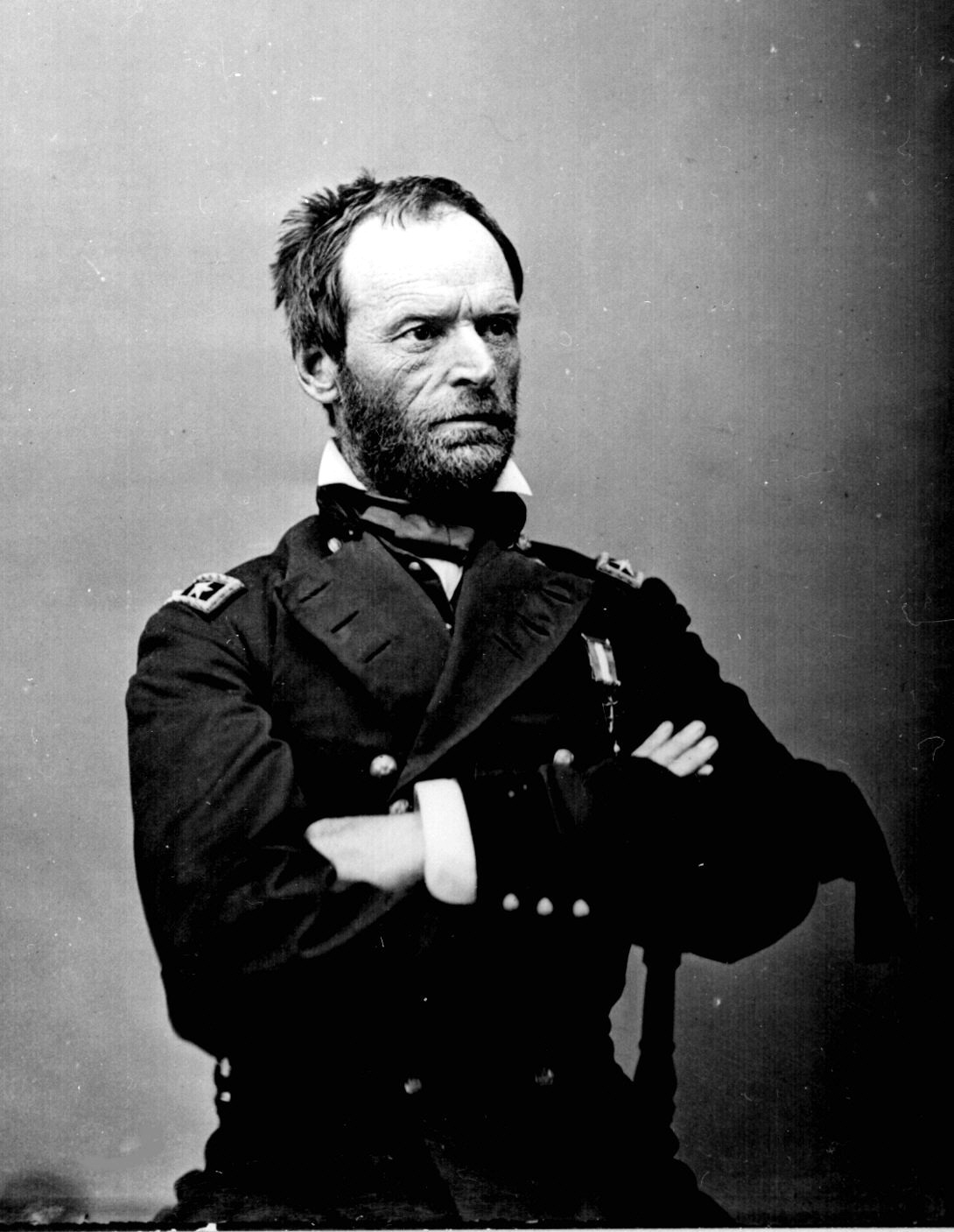
Maj. Gen.
William T. Sherman

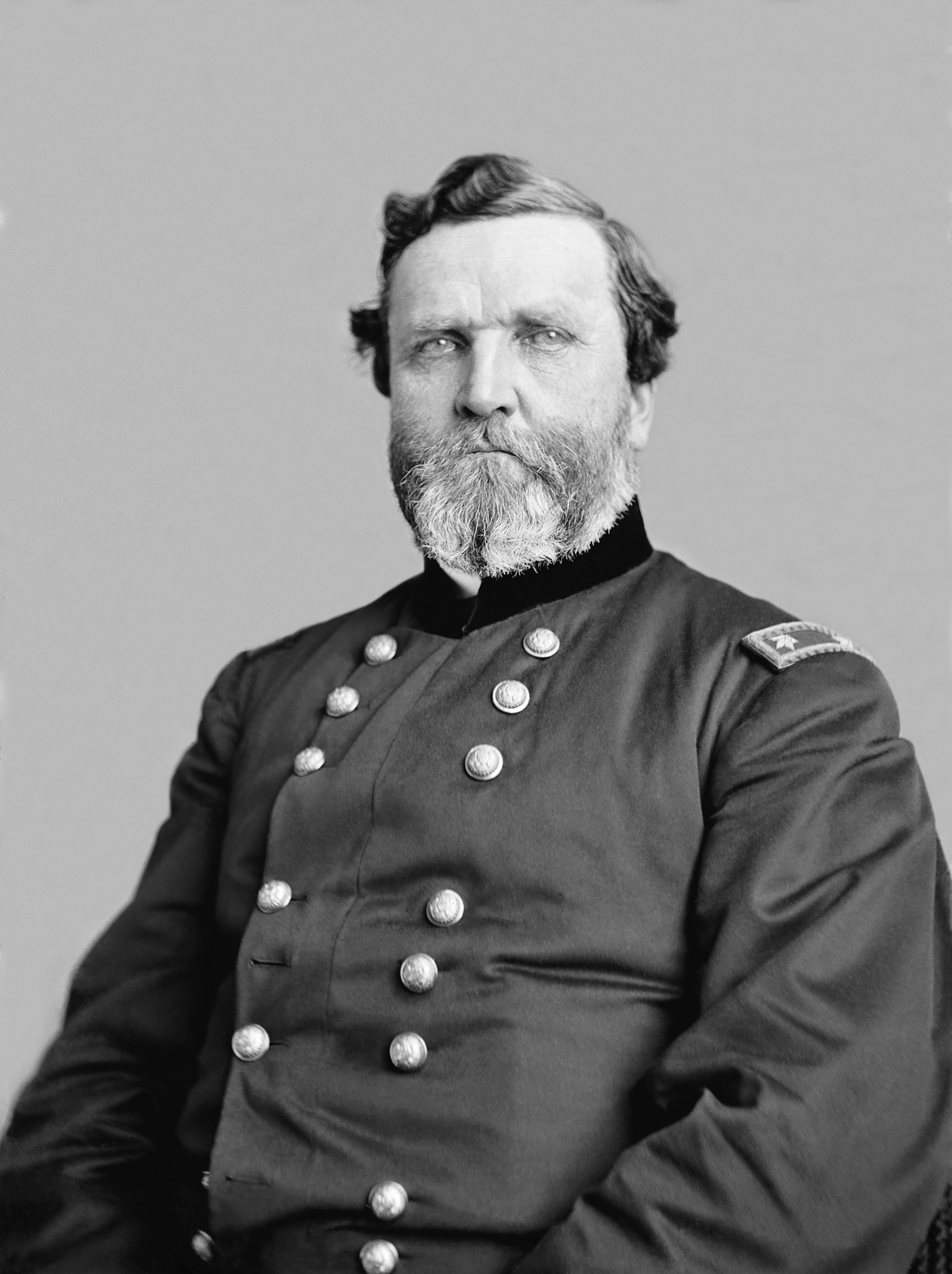
Maj. Gen.
George H. Thomas

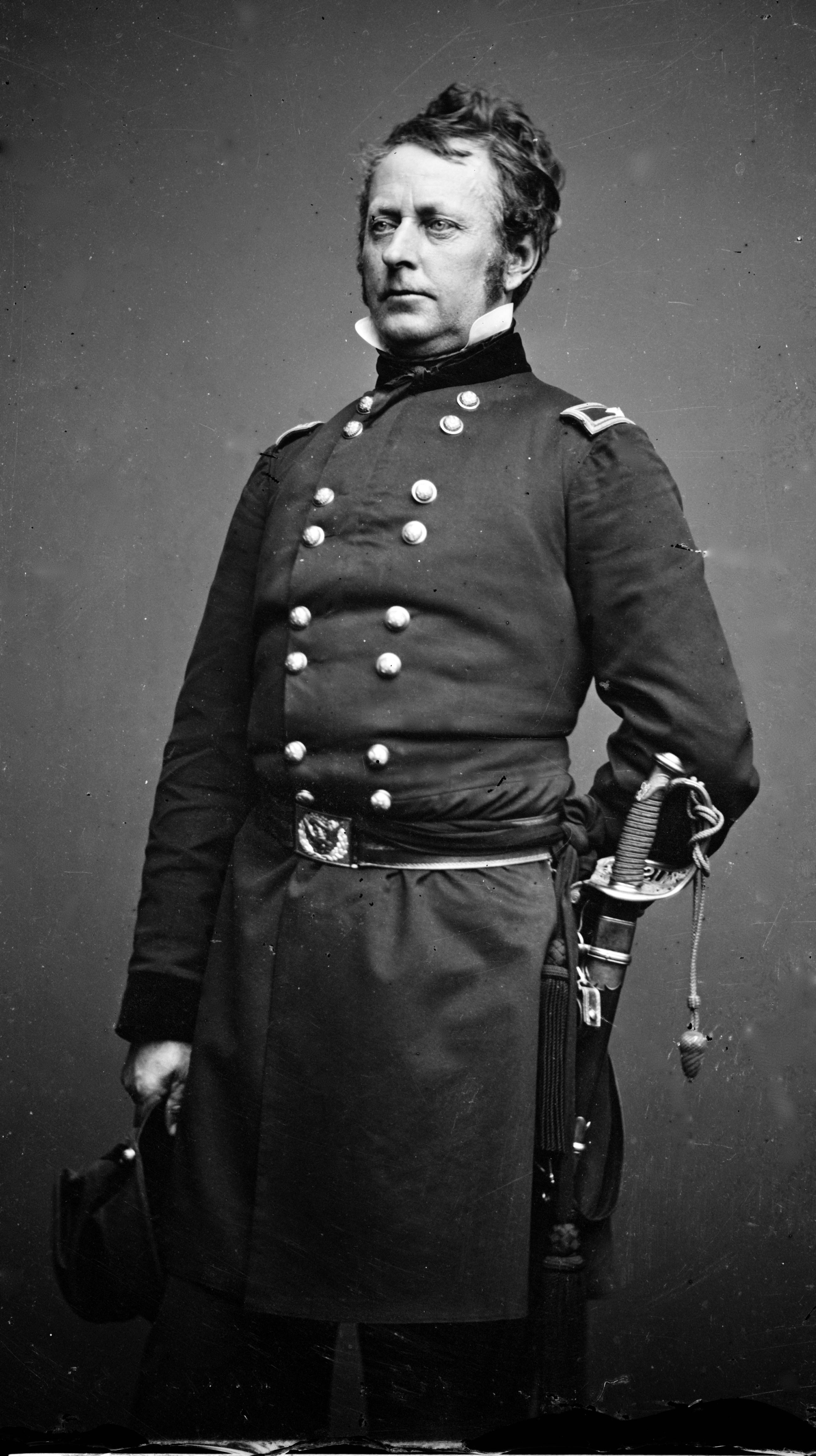
Maj. Gen.
Joseph Hooker

Grant's Military Division of the Mississippi assembled the following forces at Chattanooga:

- The Army of the Tennessee, commanded by Maj. Gen. William T. Sherman, consisting of the XV Corps under Maj. Gen. Frank P. Blair Jr., and the 2nd Division of the XVII Corps under Brig. Gen. John E. Smith.
- The Army of the Cumberland, commanded by Maj. Gen. George H. Thomas, consisting of the IV Corps under Maj. Gen. Gordon Granger, and the XIV Corps under Maj. Gen. John M. Palmer.
- The command of Maj. Gen. Joseph Hooker, which was part of the Army of the Cumberland during the battle, consisting of the XI Corps under Maj. Gen. Oliver O. Howard and the 2nd Division of the XII Corps under Brig. Gen. John W. Geary. (On November 24 and 25, Hooker was in direct command of the 2nd Division of the XII Corps, along with Charles Cruft's division detached from the IV Corps and Peter J. Osterhaus' division detached from the XV Corps.)

=== Confederate ===
Confederate corps commanders
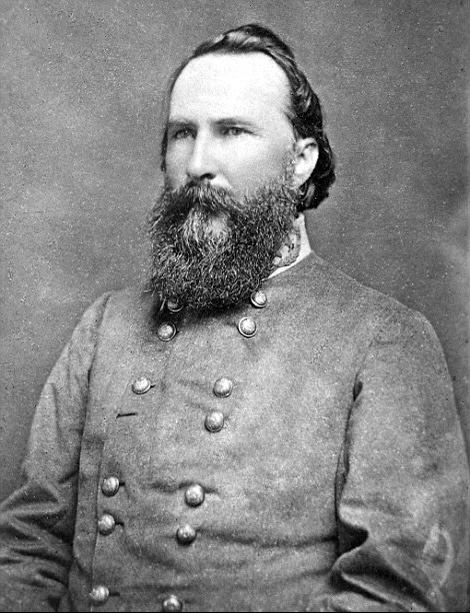
Lt. Gen.
James Longstreet

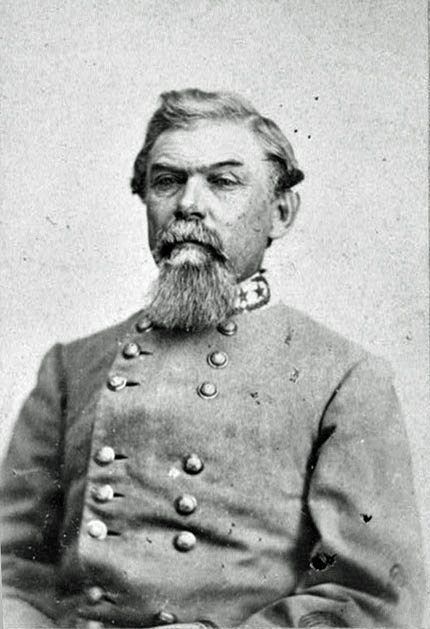
Lt. Gen.
William J. Hardee

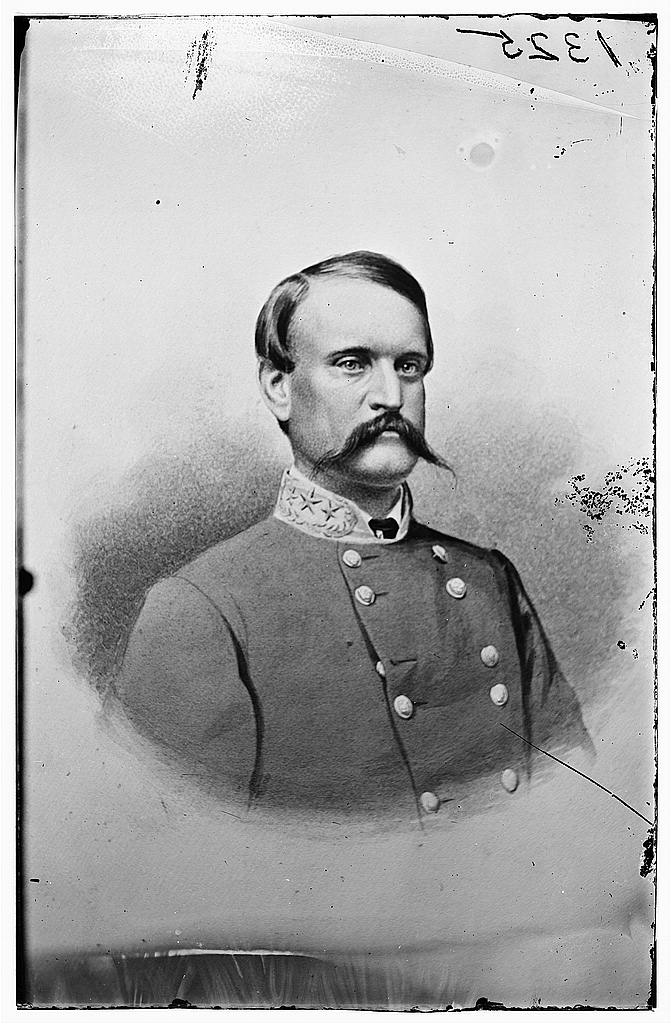
Maj. Gen.
John C. Breckinridge

Bragg's Army of Tennessee had the following forces available in Chattanooga:

- Longstreet's Corps, under Lt. Gen. James Longstreet, consisting of the divisions under Maj. Gen. Lafayette McLaws and Brig. Gen. Micah Jenkins (replacing John Bell Hood, wounded at Chickamauga). Longstreet's Corps was dispatched to Knoxville on November 5.
- Hardee's Corps, under Lt. Gen. William J. Hardee, consisting of the divisions under Brig. Gen. John K. Jackson (Cheatham's Division), Brig. Gen. J. Patton Anderson (Hindman's Division), Brig. Gen. States Rights Gist (Walker's Division), and Maj. Gen. Simon B. Buckner (detached November 22 to Knoxville).
- Breckinridge's Corps, commanded by Maj. Gen. John C. Breckinridge, consisting of the divisions of Maj. Gens. Patrick R. Cleburne, Alexander P. Stewart, Carter L. Stevenson, and Brig. Gen. William B. Bate (Breckinridge's Division).

On November 5, Bragg seriously weakened his forces by sending Longstreet's Corps against Maj. Gen. Ambrose Burnside near Knoxville. On November 23, Bragg further weakened his forces by ordering the division of Maj. Gen. Simon B. Buckner to reinforce Longstreet at Knoxville.

== The Battles for Chattanooga ==
=== Orchard Knob ===
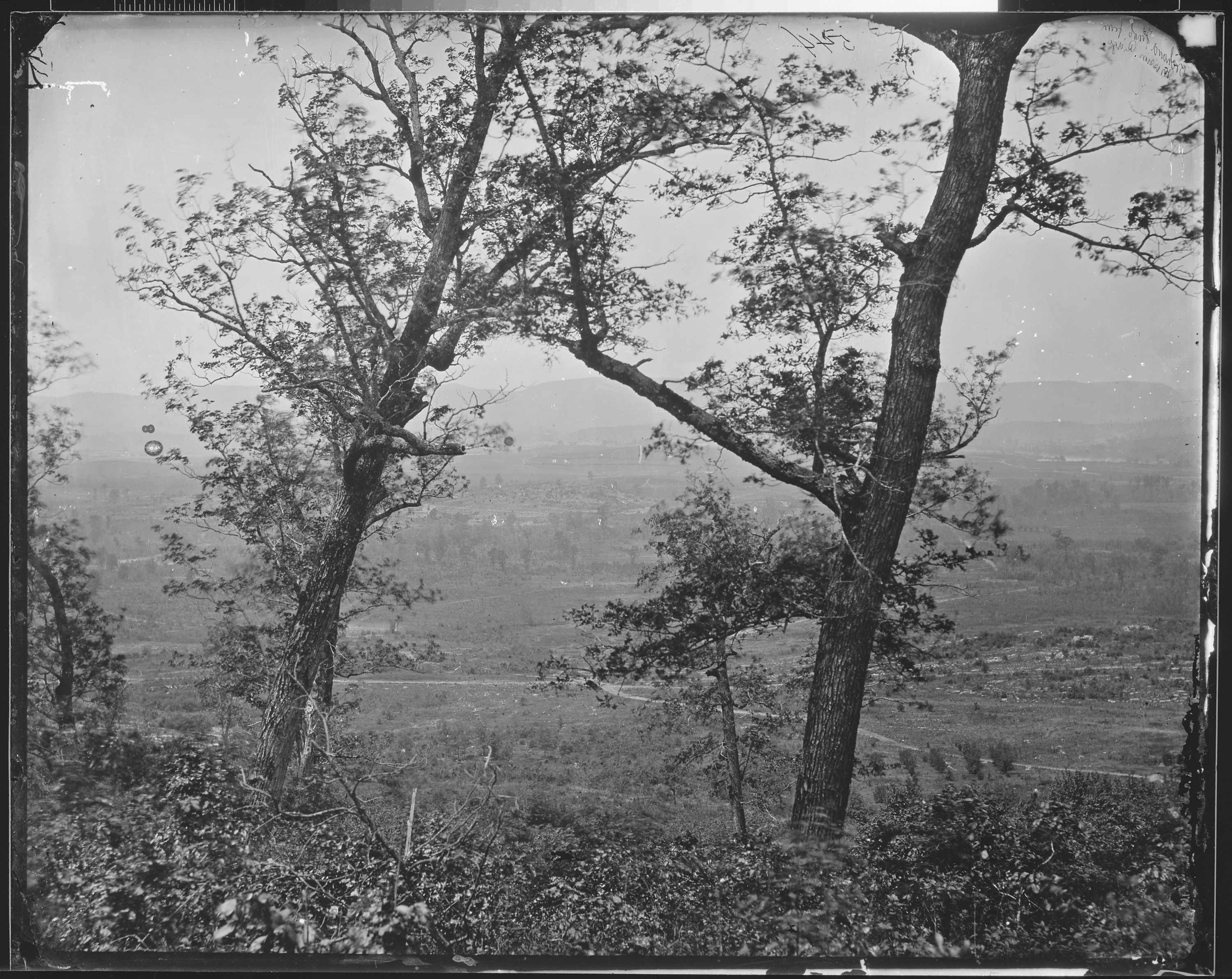
Orchard Knob in 1864

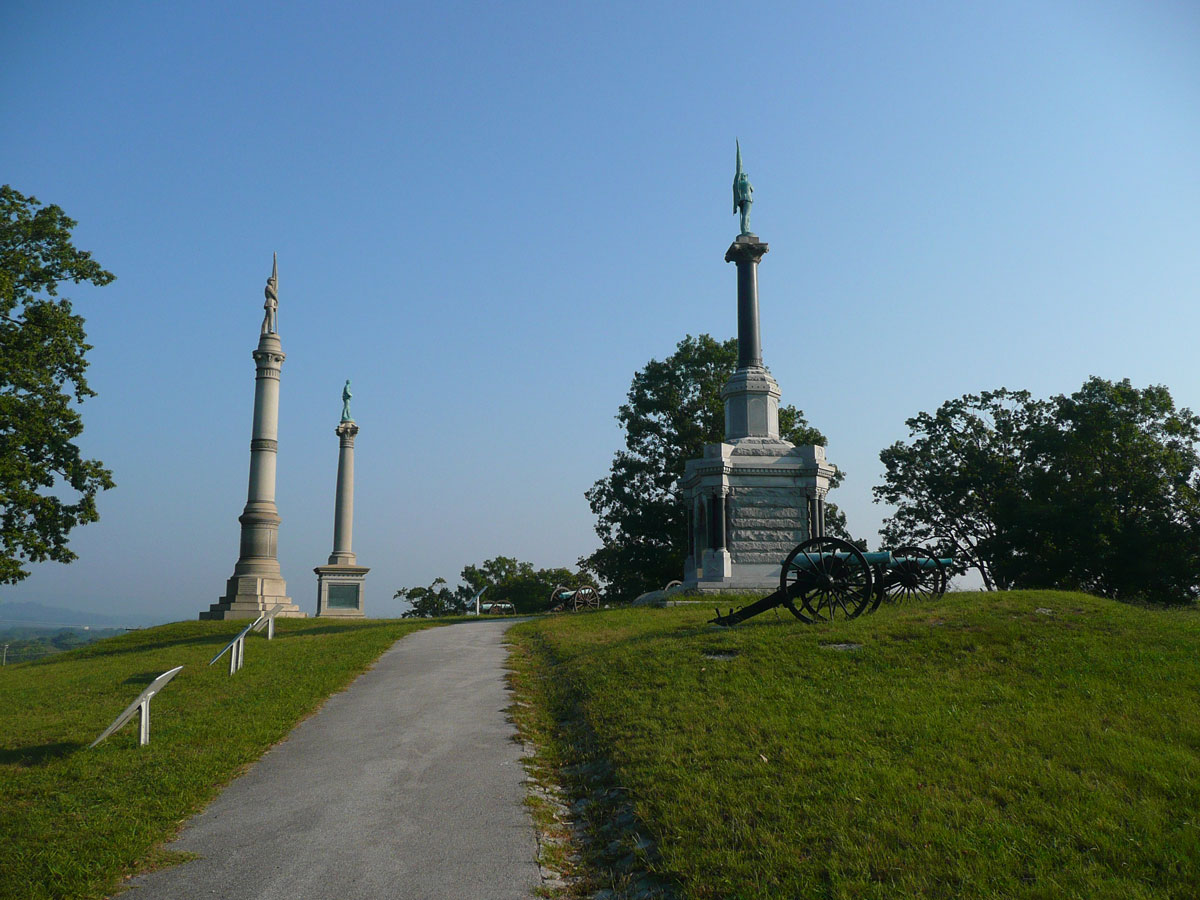
Battle monuments on Orchard Knob

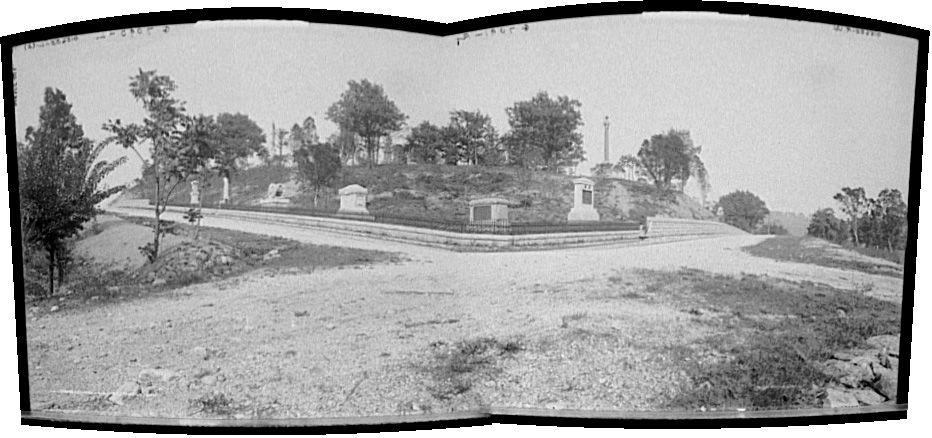
Orchard Knob, c. 1900–1915

On November 23, the Union army observed columns of Cleburne's and Buckner's men marching away from Missionary Ridge and also heard claims from Confederate deserters that the entire army was falling back. Grant became concerned that Bragg was massively reinforcing Longstreet and sought to disrupt the movement. Thomas ordered his division under Brig. Gen. Thomas J. Wood to advance in a reconnaissance in force, instructing him to avoid an engagement with the enemy and return to his fortifications when the strength of the Confederate line was revealed. Wood's men assembled outside of their entrenchments and observed their objective approximately 2,000 yards to the east, a small knoll 100 feet high known as Orchard Knob (also known as Indian Hill). Maj. Gen. Philip Sheridan's division lined up similarly to protect Wood's right flank, and Howard's XI Corps extended the line to the left, presenting over 20,000 soldiers arrayed in almost parade-ground alignment.

I never saw troops move into action in finer style than Thomas's did today. They are entitled to the highest praise for their soldierly bearing and splendid bravery.

— Grant's chief of staff, John Rawlins

At 1:30 p.m., 14,000 Union soldiers moved forward at the double quick, sweeping across the plain, stunning the 600 Confederate defenders, who were able to fire only a single volley before they were overrun. Casualties were relatively low on both sides. Grant and Thomas decided to order the men to hold their position and entrench, rather than following the original orders to withdraw. Orchard Knob became Grant's and Thomas's headquarters for the remainder of the battles.

Bragg quickly readjusted his strategy, recalling all units that were within a day's march. Cleburne's division returned after dark from Chickamauga Station, interrupting the process of boarding the trains to Knoxville. Bragg began to reduce the strength on his left by withdrawing Maj. Gen. William H. T. Walker's division from the base of Lookout Mountain and placing them on the far right of Missionary Ridge, just south of Tunnel Hill. He assigned Hardee to command his now critical right flank, turning over the left flank to Carter Stevenson. In the center, Breckinridge ordered his men to begin fortifying the crest of Missionary Ridge, a task that Bragg had somehow neglected for weeks. Unable to decide whether to defend the base or the crest of the Ridge, the divisions of Brig. Gens. William B. Bate and Patton Anderson were ordered to move half of their divisions to the crest, leaving the remainder in the rifle pits along the base. James L. McDonough wrote of the upper entrenchments, "Placed along the physical crest rather than what is termed the military crest ... these works severely handicapped the defenders."

The Union side also changed plans. Sherman had three divisions ready to cross the Tennessee, but the pontoon bridge at Brown's Ferry had torn apart and Brig. Gen. Peter J. Osterhaus's division was stranded in Lookout Valley. After receiving assurances from Sherman that he could proceed with three divisions, Grant decided to revive the previously rejected plan for an attack on Lookout Mountain and reassigned Osterhaus to Hooker's command.

=== Lookout Mountain ===
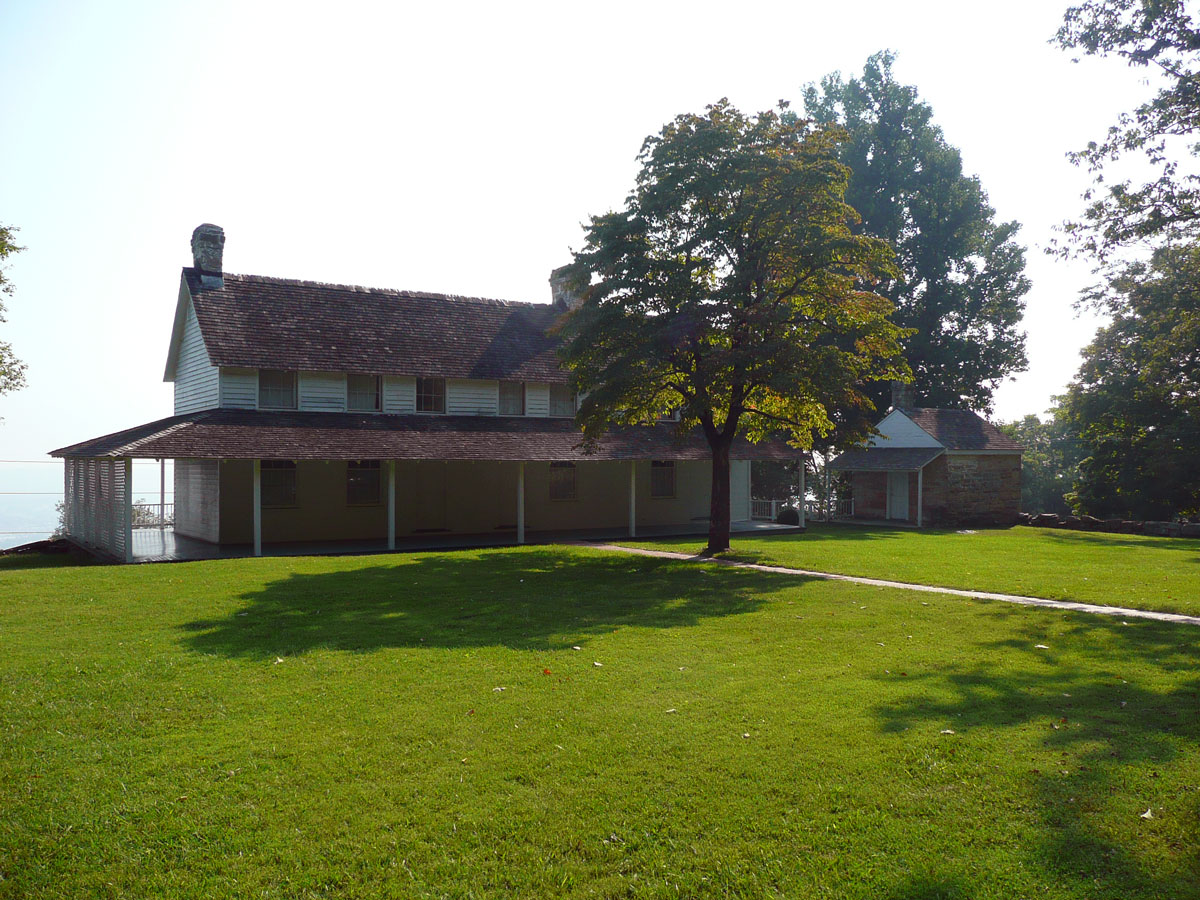
Cravens house on Lookout Mountain

Battles for Chattanooga, November 24–25, 1863

Grant's battle plan of November 18 merely assigned Hooker the task of holding Lookout Valley. Six days later, however, Hooker had about 10,000 men in three divisions at his disposal, because Brig. Gen. Peter J. Osterhaus's (XV Corps) could not cross the Tennessee due to disruption of the pontoon bridges. With Brig. Gen. John W. Geary's (XII Corps) and Brig. Gen. Charles Cruft's (XIV Corps, but missing one brigade) divisions, Hooker had too large a force to be wasted on guard duty. Thomas authorized a demonstration against the mountain, with the possibility of a full-scale assault. Hooker was ordered to "take the point only if his demonstration should develop its practicability." "Fighting Joe" ignored this subtlety and ordered Geary "to cross Lookout Creek and to assault Lookout Mountain, marching down the valley and sweeping every rebel from it."

While the advance of Cruft and Osterhaus demonstrated at Lookout Creek, Geary crossed the stream unopposed further south and found that the defile between the mountain and the river had not been secured. The Union troops were opposed by Brig. Gen. Edward C. Walthall's brigade of Maj. Gen. Benjamin F. Cheatham's division (temporarily under the command of Brig. Gen. John K. Jackson). Geary swept northeast along the base of Lookout Mountain and pushed Walthall's completely outflanked and badly outnumbered men back to the Cravens House, just below the northern end of the mountain.

The men of Brig. Gen. John C. Brown's Confederate brigade on the mountain top found themselves powerless to intervene in the battle raging below the cliffs. Geary's success allowed the other two divisions to cross the creek and push aside the Confederate skirmishers in front of them. Brig. Gen. John C. Moore brought his brigade up around 1:00 p.m. to become embroiled in a fight with Geary and Brig. Gen. Walter C. Whitaker's brigade of Cruft's division. Moore was pushed back and soon joined by Brig. Gen. Edmund Pettus's brigade.

By about 3:00 p.m., thick fog enveloped the mountain. Brig. Gen. Montgomery C. Meigs, quartermaster general of the Union Army, observing from Orchard Knob, was the first writer to name the action on Lookout Mountain the "Battle Above the Clouds". The two sides blazed away blindly in the fog the rest of the afternoon but few men were hit. During the fight, Hooker sent a stream of "alternate whimpering and blustering" messages to Grant, but got it exactly right when he predicted, "In all probability the enemy will evacuate tonight." Realizing the battle was lost, Bragg ordered the position abandoned. At midnight the fog cleared and, under a lunar eclipse, the divisions of Stevenson and Cheatham retreated behind Chattanooga Creek, burning the bridges behind them.

That night Bragg asked his two corps commanders whether to retreat or to stand and fight. Hardee counseled retreat, but Breckinridge convinced Bragg to fight it out on the strong position of Missionary Ridge. Accordingly, the troops withdrawn from Lookout Mountain were ordered to the right flank.

=== Missionary Ridge ===
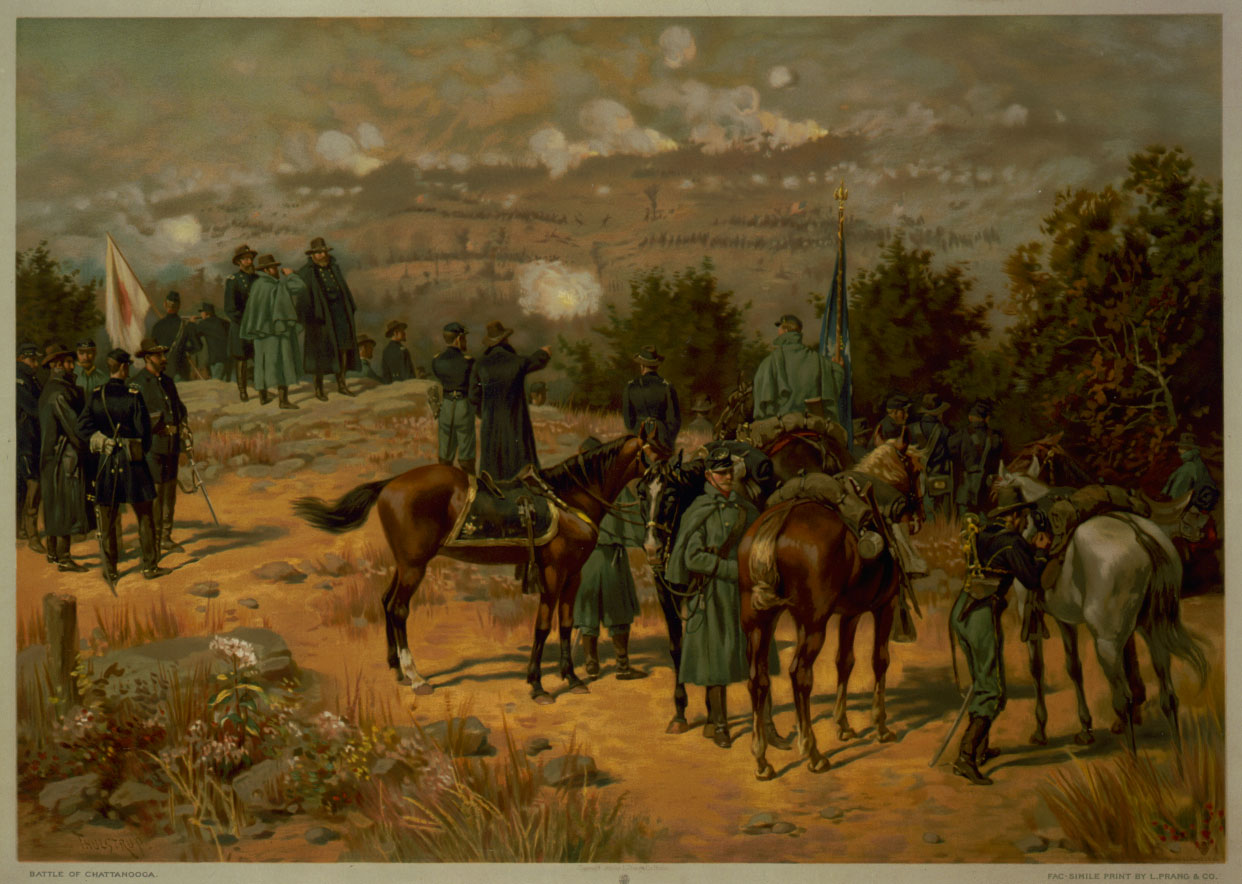
Battle of Chattanooga by Thure de Thulstrup. Ulysses S. Grant uses a field glass to follow the Union assault on Missionary Ridge. Grant is joined by Generals Gordon Granger (left) and George H. Thomas.

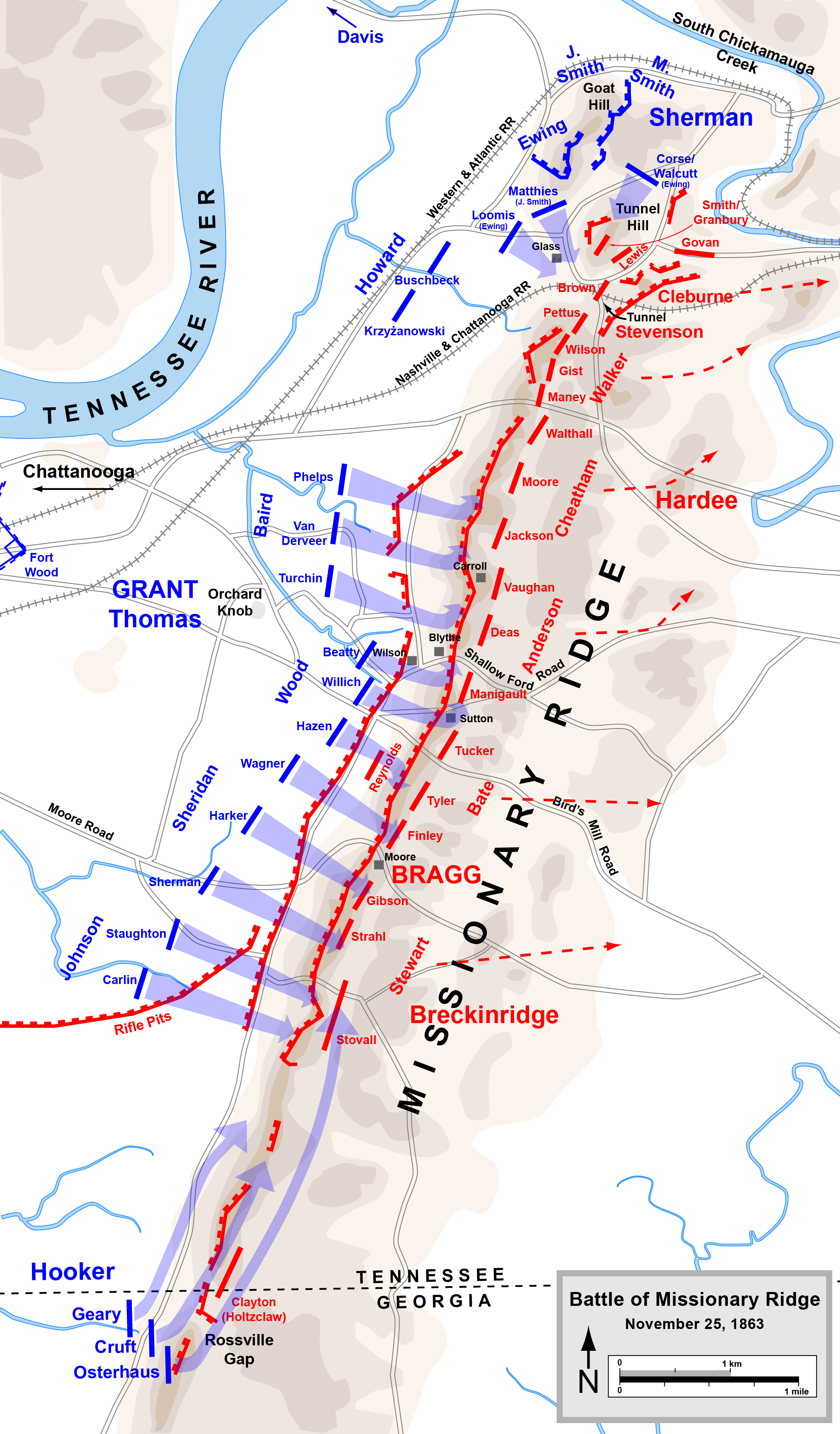
Battle of Missionary Ridge, November 25, 1863 Confederate Union

Sherman's remaining three divisions crossed the Tennessee River successfully on the morning of November 24, with an Army of the Cumberland division that was assigned to him following later, then occupied what the general thought—due to faulty intelligence—was the north end of Missionary Ridge but was actually a completely separate rise known as Billy Goat Hill. Sherman was dismayed to see that, across a deep ravine, the Confederates had fortified Tunnel Hill, the northernmost portion of the ridge. Although his goal was the railroad tunnel, on the far side, he took no further offensive action for the day. Sherman ordered his men to dig in on Billy Goat Hill.

On November 25, Grant's plan called for a continued effort by Sherman to ascend Missionary Ridge from the north and move southward toward the center of the Confederate position. Grant gave a supporting role to Thomas:

I have instructed Sherman to advance as soon as it is light in the morning, and your attack, which will be simultaneous, will be in cooperation. Your command will either carry the rifle pits and ridge directly in front of them or move to the left, as the presence of the enemy may require.

Grant had no particular expectation for Hooker other than to divert Bragg's attention by ascending to the plateau of Lookout Mountain. Thomas wanted support on his flank, however, and called Hooker to cross the valley and advance against Bragg's left flank directly at the Rossville Gap. As the morning progressed, Sherman launched multiple direct assaults against Cleburne's line on Tunnel Hill but, despite his significantly larger force, committed only four brigades to the attacks and made no headway. At the southern end of the battlefield, Hooker's advance was slowed for hours by the burned bridges on Chattanooga Creek.

Seeing the lack of progress on the flanks, around 3:30 p.m. Grant ordered Thomas to move forward in the center in a demonstration meant to help Sherman. The men of the Army of the Cumberland advanced and quickly pushed the Confederates from their rifle pits, fulfilling their orders, but were then subjected to a punishing fire from the Confederate positions up the ridge. Most of Thomas's troops had been in the disastrous loss at Chickamauga and had suffered taunts by Sherman's and Hooker's newly arrived forces. Now they were under fire from above with no apparent plan to advance or move back. At this point, the Union soldiers continued the attack against the remaining lines. This second advance was taken up by the commanders on the spot, but also by some of the soldiers who, on their own, sought shelter from the fire further up the slope. Bragg had placed his artillery and trenches of the infantry along the actual crest of the ridge, rather than the military crest further down the slope, and they were unable to provide effective fire. The Union advance was disorganized but effective, finally overwhelming and scattering what ought to have been an impregnable Confederate line. As such, the Army of the Cumberland's ascent of Missionary Ridge was one of the war's most dramatic events. Military historians Herman Hattaway and Archer Jones contend that the Battle of Missionary Ridge was "the war's most notable example of a frontal assault succeeding against intrenched defenders holding high ground." A Union officer remembered that

Little regard to formation was observed. Each battalion assumed a triangular shape, the colors at the apex. ... [a] color-bearer dashes ahead of the line and falls. A comrade grasps the flag. ... He, too, falls. Then another picks it up ... waves it defiantly, and as if bearing a charmed life, he advances steadily towards the top ...

The final flag bearer referenced in the passage above was actually Arthur MacArthur Jr, father of Douglas Macarthur, his actions to pick up the flag and advance earned him a Medal of Honor. Grant was initially furious that his orders to advance only as far as the rifle pits had not been followed and threatened his subordinates from the Army of the Cumberland if the assault failed. But it succeeded. By 4:30 p.m. the center of Bragg's line had broken completely and fled in panic, requiring the abandonment of Missionary Ridge and a headlong retreat eastward to South Chickamauga Creek. The exception to the panicked flight was Hardee's command on the Confederate right, facing Sherman. Cleburne's division, augmented by two other brigades, formed the rearguard of Bragg's army as it retreated eastward.

=== Rossville Gap ===
After Maj. Gen. Joseph Hooker's command left Lookout Mountain at about 10 a.m. and moved east, they encountered a significant obstacle. The bridge across Chattanooga Creek, about a mile from Rossville Gap, had been burned by the Confederates as they withdrew the night before and the creek was running high. Brig. Gen. Peter J. Osterhaus assigned a 70-man pioneer unit to start rebuilding the bridge while men of the 27th Missouri created a rickety footbridge and began crossing one by one. Hooker decided to leave his guns and wagons behind so that all of his infantry could cross first, but his advance was delayed about three hours and he did not reach Rossville Gap until 3:30 p.m.

Breckinridge was absent while the Union attack wrecked his corps. Worried about his left flank, he rode to the end of his line in the early afternoon. At 3:30 p.m., about the time Thomas launched his four-division attack on Missionary Ridge, Breckinridge visited Stewart's left flank brigade of Col. James T. Holtzclaw, whose commander pointed to the southwest where Hooker's men were busily bridging Chattanooga Creek. Concerned about Rossville Gap, which lay undefended beyond his left flank, Breckinridge ordered Holtzclaw to send a couple of regiments to hold the position. It was too late; by the time the Southerners reached the gap, Osterhaus's division had already marched through. Lt. J. Cabell Breckinridge, the general's son and aide-de-camp, rode into a group from the 9th Iowa and was captured.

Hooker quickly faced his troops to the north and organized a three-pronged attack. He sent Osterhaus along a trail east of Missionary Ridge, Cruft onto the ridge itself, and Geary along the western face of the ridge. Holtzclaw faced his men south and put up a fight, but Cruft and Osterhaus soon began herding the outnumbered Confederates north along Missionary Ridge. Hearing a tremendous racket to the north, Breckinridge finally rode off to find out what was wrong. As Holtzclaw retreated before Hooker's command, he eventually bumped into Col. Anson G. McCook's 2nd Ohio of Carlin's brigade, now astride the ridge. Surrounded by superior forces on four sides, approximately 700 of Holtzclaw's men surrendered.

== Retreat and pursuit ==
During the night, Bragg ordered his army to withdraw toward Chickamauga Station on the Western and Atlantic Railroad (currently the site of Lovell Air Field) and on November 26 began retreating toward Dalton, Georgia, in two columns taking two routes. Only Sheridan tried to pursue beyond Missionary Ridge, but he finally gave up late that night when it was clear that he was not being supported by either Granger or Thomas.

=== Ringgold Gap ===
The pursuit ordered by Grant was effectively thwarted at the Battle of Ringgold Gap. At 3 a.m. on November 27, Cleburne readied his men and waited until the Union force was almost upon them before opening fire with artillery and rifles. Maj. Gen. Joseph Hooker's force was taken utterly by surprise, but he tried to use his numbers to regain the initiative. He attempted to outflank the Confederates both on the right and on the left, but the Confederates held their positions. For five hours the slaughter continued, Cleburne's 4,100 soldiers against Hooker's 12,000, with Hooker gaining little ground. Cleburne's men stayed to about noon, then retreated, successfully allowing the wagons and artillery to pass through the gap unharmed.

Grant called off the remaining pursuit because his army was low on rations and he decided he needed to stay close to his supply line. Furthermore, Washington was still clamoring for the rescue of Burnside in Knoxville and Grant was told that the Union troops there had rations that would last only until December 3. President Lincoln's message of congratulations to Grant after Missionary Ridge had said "Well done. Many thanks to all. Remember Burnside."

== Aftermath ==
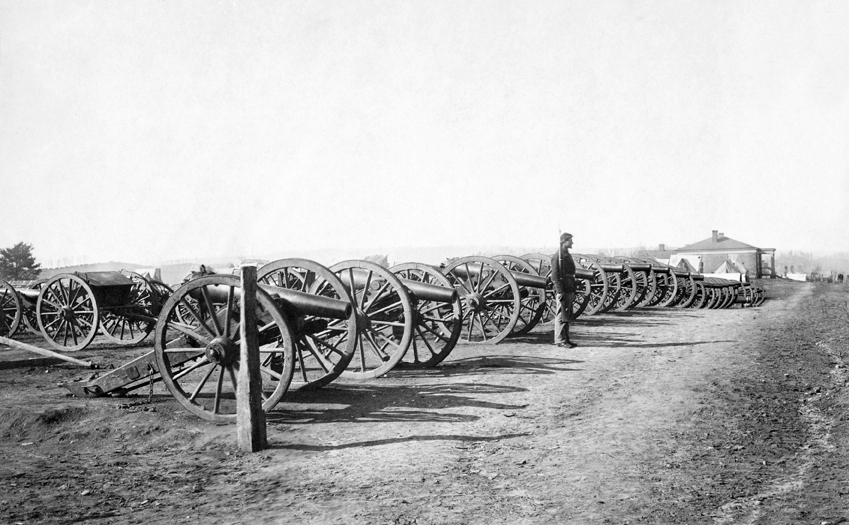
Captured artillery, c. 1865

Casualties for the Union Army amounted to 5,824 (753 killed, 4,722 wounded, and 349 missing) of about 56,000 engaged; Bragg reported Confederate casualties of 6,667 (361 killed, 2,160 wounded, and 4,146 missing, mostly prisoners) of about 44,000. Southern losses may have been higher; Grant claimed 6,142 prisoners. When a chaplain asked General Thomas whether the dead should be sorted and buried by state, Thomas replied "Mix 'em up. I'm tired of States' rights."

One of the Confederacy's two major armies was routed. Bragg relieved Breckinridge from command, accusing him of drunkenness during the period November 23–27. Bragg chose to blame Breckinridge and the cowardice of his army for the defeat. He resigned from command of the Army of Tennessee on December 1 and was replaced temporarily by Hardee. (Gen. Joseph E. Johnston assumed command of the army on December 27.)

In East Tennessee, Longstreet's offensive against Burnside (the Knoxville campaign) fell apart at the Battle of Fort Sanders on November 29. Although he was ordered to rejoin Bragg, Longstreet considered the order impracticable and informed Bragg that he would return with his command to Virginia but would maintain the siege on Knoxville as long as possible in the hopes that Burnside and Grant could be prevented from joining forces and annihilating the Army of Tennessee. This plan turned out to be effective because Grant sent Sherman with 25,000 men to relieve the siege at Knoxville. Longstreet abandoned his siege on December 4, went into winter quarters, and returned to Virginia in the spring of 1864.

The Confederate enthusiasm that had risen so high after Chickamauga had been dashed at Chattanooga. The Union now held undisputed control of the state of Tennessee, including Chattanooga, the "Gateway to the Lower South." The city became the supply and logistics base for Sherman's 1864 Atlanta campaign, as well as for the Army of the Cumberland. Grant had won his final battle in the West prior to receiving command of all Union armies in March 1864.

== Battlefield preservation ==
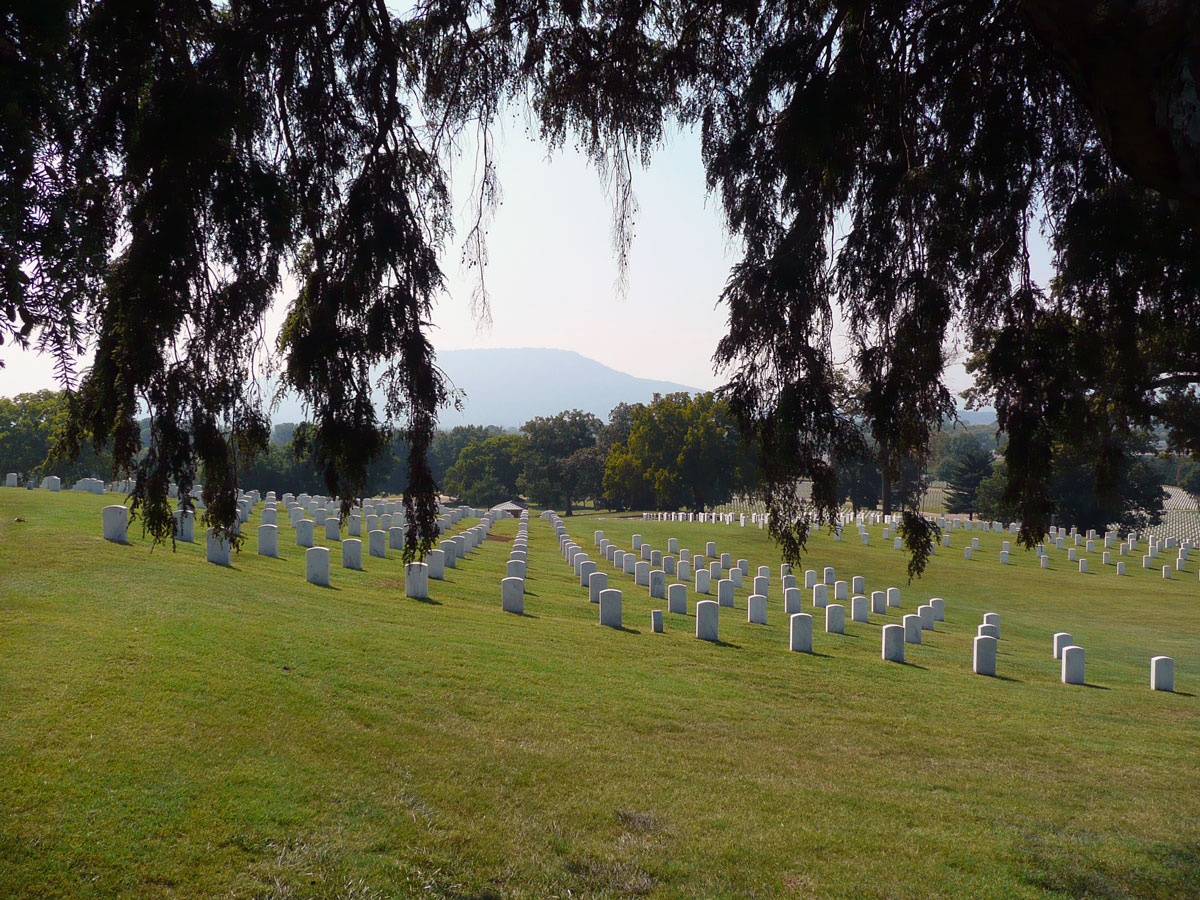
National cemetery at Chattanooga with a view of Lookout Mountain in the distance

Portions of the Chattanooga battlefields, including 3,000 acres (1,200 ha) at Lookout Mountain, are preserved by the National Park Service as part of the Chickamauga and Chattanooga National Military Park. The American Battlefield Trust and its partners have acquired and preserved more than 405 acres (1.64 km^{2}) of the Chattanooga battlefield as of mid-2023.

== See also ==
- Troop engagements of the American Civil War, 1863
- List of costliest American Civil War land battles
- Battle of Chickamauga
- First Battle of Chattanooga
- Second Battle of Chattanooga
- Armies in the American Civil War
