= Battle of Arkansas Post order of battle: Union =

The following Union Army units and commanders fought in the Battle of Arkansas Post (1863) (otherwise known as Battle of Fort Hindman) of the American Civil War. The Confederate order of battle is listed separately. Order of battle compiled from the army organization and return of casualties during the battle.

== Abbreviations used ==
=== Military rank ===
- MG = Major General
- BG = Brigadier General
- Col = Colonel
- Ltc = Lieutenant Colonel
- Maj = Major
- Cpt = Captain
- Lt = 1st Lieutenant

=== Other ===
- w = wounded

== Army of the Mississippi ==
MG John A. McClernand

=== XIII Corps ===
BG George W. Morgan

- Chief of Staff: Maj John H. Hammond
- Escort: Company A, 3rd Illinois Cavalry: Cpt Richard H. Ballinger

Division	Brigade	Regiments and Others
First Division; BG Andrew Jackson Smith	1st Brigade; K-37, W-305, M-7 = 349 BG Stephen Gano Burbridge	16th Indiana: Ltc John M. Orr (w), Maj James H. Redfield; 60th Indiana: Col Richard Owen; 67th Indiana: Col Frank Emerson (w); 83rd Ohio: Ltc William H. Baldwin; 96th Ohio: Col Joseph W. Vance; 23rd Wisconsin: Col Joshua J. Guppey
First Division; BG Andrew Jackson Smith	2nd Brigade; K-8, W-77, M-0 = 85 Col William J. Landram	77th Illinois: Col David P. Grier; 97th Illinois: Col Friend S. Rutherford; 108th Illinois: Col John Warner; 131st Illinois: Ltc R. A. Peter; 19th Kentucky: Ltc John Cowan; 48th Ohio: Ltc Job R. Parker (w), Cpt S. G. W. Peterson
First Division; BG Andrew Jackson Smith	Artillery; K-0, W-1, M-1 = 1	Chicago Mercantile Light Artillery: Cpt Charles G. Cooley; 17th Ohio Light Artillery: Cpt Ambrose A. Blount
First Division; BG Andrew Jackson Smith	Cavalry; K-0, W-0, M-0 = 0	6th Missouri Cavalry (squadron): Col Clark Wright
Second Division; BG Peter J. Osterhaus	1st Brigade; K-3, W-14, M-11 = 28 Col Lionel A. Sheldon	118th Illinois: Col John G. Fonda; 69th Indiana: Col Thomas Warren Bennett; 120th Ohio: Col Daniel French
Second Division; BG Peter J. Osterhaus	2nd Brigade; K-0, W-0, M-0 = 0 Col Daniel W. Lindsey	49th Indiana: Col James Keigwin; 7th Kentucky: Cpt Andrew H. Clark; 114th Ohio: Ltc Horatio B. Maynard
Second Division; BG Peter J. Osterhaus	3rd Brigade; K-0, W-0, M-0 = 0 Col John F. DeCourcy	54th Indiana: Col Fielding Mansfield; 22nd Kentucky: Maj William J. Worthington; 16th Ohio: Cpt Eli W. Botsford; 42nd Ohio: Ltc Don Albert Pardee
Second Division; BG Peter J. Osterhaus	Artillery; K-0, W-0, M-0 = 0	Battery G, 1st Michigan Light Artillery: Cpt Charles H. Lanphere; 1st Wisconsin Light Artillery: Cpt Jacob T. Foster
Second Division; BG Peter J. Osterhaus	Engineers	Patterson's Kentucky Engineers & Mechanics: Cpt William F. Patterson

=== XV Corps ===
MG William T. Sherman

Division	Brigade	Regiments and Others
Fourth Division; BG Frederick Steele: Escort: Dodson's Kane County (Illinois) Cavalry: Cpt William C. Wilder	1st Brigade; K-0, W-9, M-0 = 9 BG Francis Preston Blair Jr.	13th Illinois: Ltc Adam B. Gorgas; 29th Missouri: Col John S. Cavender; 30th Missouri: Ltc Otto Schadt; 31st Missouri: Ltc Samuel P. Simpson; 32nd Missouri: Col Francis H. Manter; 58th Ohio: Cpt Bastian Benkler; 4th Ohio Battery: Cpt Louis Hoffman
Fourth Division; BG Frederick Steele: Escort: Dodson's Kane County (Illinois) Cavalry: Cpt William C. Wilder	2nd Brigade; K-38, W-182, M-2 = 222 BG Charles E. Hovey (w)	25th Iowa: Col George A. Stone; 31st Iowa: Col William Smyth; 3rd Missouri: Col Isaac F. Shepard; 12th Missouri: Col Hugo Wangelin; 17th Missouri: Col Francis Hassendeubel; 76th Ohio: Col Charles Robert Woods; 1st Missouri Horse Artillery: Cpt Clemens Landgraeber
Fourth Division; BG Frederick Steele: Escort: Dodson's Kane County (Illinois) Cavalry: Cpt William C. Wilder	3rd Brigade; K-24, W-156, M-0 = 180 BG John Milton Thayer	4th Iowa: Col James Alexander Williamson; 9th Iowa: Ltc William H. Coyl; 26th Iowa: Col Milo Smith; 30th Iowa: Ltc W. M. G. Torrence; 34th Iowa: Col George W. Clark; 1st Iowa Light Artillery: Cpt Henry H. Griffiths
Fourth Division; BG Frederick Steele: Escort: Dodson's Kane County (Illinois) Cavalry: Cpt William C. Wilder	Cavalry; K-0, W-0, M-0 = 0	3rd Illinois Cavalry: Col Lafayette McCrillis
Second Division; BG David Stuart	1st Brigade; K-18, W-84, M-0 = 102 Col Giles A. Smith	113th Illinois: Col George B. Hoge; 116th Illinois: Ltc James P. Boyd; 6th Missouri: Ltc James H. Blood; 8th Missouri: Ltc David C. Coleman (w), Maj Dennis T. Kirby; 1st Battalion, 13th US: Maj Daniel Chase
Second Division; BG David Stuart	2nd Brigade; K-6, W-70, M-9 = 85 Col Thomas Kilby Smith	55th Illinois: Ltc Oscar Malmborg; 127th Illinois: Col John Van Arman; 83rd Indiana: Col Benjamin J. Spooner; 54th Ohio: Cpt S. B. Yoeman (w); 57th Ohio: Col William Mungen
Second Division; BG David Stuart	Artillery; K-0, W-0, M-0 = 0	Battery A, 1st Illinois Light Artillery: Cpt Peter P. Wood; Battery B, 1st Illinois Light Artillery: Cpt Samuel E. Barrett; Battery H, 1st Illinois Light Artillery: Lt Levi W. Hart; 8th Ohio Light Artillery: Lt James F. Putnam
Second Division; BG David Stuart	Cavalry; K-0, W-0, M-0 = 0	Company A & B, Thielman's Battalion (Illinois): Cpt Bertold Marschner; Company C, 6th Missouri Cavalry: Lt Daniel W. Ballou

=== Naval forces ===
Rear Admiral David D. Porter

Fifty transport ships were used as well as the following:

Class	Vessel
City class ironclad
City class ironclad	USS Baron DeKalb Lieutenant Commander William Gwin
City class ironclad	USS Cincinnati Lieutenant George M. Bache
City class ironclad	U.S.S. Louisville Lieutenant Commander Elias K. Owen
Tinclad	USS Glide Acting Lieutenant Selim E. Woodworth
Tinclad	USS Rattler Lieutenant Commander Watson Smith
Others	USS Black Hawk Lieutenant Commander K. R. Breese
Others	U.S.S. Lexington Lieutenant James W. Shirk
Others	USS Monarch Colonel C. R. Ellet
Others	USS New Era Acting Master F. W. Flanner [possibly, Acting Master J. C. Bunner]

== See also ==
- Arkansas in the American Civil War
- McClernand's Official Report
