= Battle of Arkansas Post order of battle =

The order of battle for the Battle of Arkansas Post (1863), also known as the Battle of Fort Hindman, includes:

- Battle of Arkansas Post order of battle: Confederate
- Battle of Arkansas Post order of battle: Union
