= 29th Missouri Infantry Regiment =

- Active: July 1861 to June 12, 1865
- Country: United States
- Allegiance: Union
- Branch: Infantry
- Engagements: Yazoo Pass Expedition; Battle of Chickasaw Bayou; Battle of Chickasaw Bluff; Battle of Arkansas Post; Siege of Vicksburg, May 19 & May 22 assaults Siege of Jackson; Chattanooga campaign Battle of Lookout Mountain; Battle of Missionary Ridge; Atlanta campaign Battle of Resaca; Battle of Dallas; Battle of New Hope Church; Battle of Allatoona; Battle of Kennesaw Mountain; Battle of Atlanta; Siege of Atlanta; Battle of Jonesborough; Battle of Lovejoy's Station; Sherman's March to the Sea; Carolinas campaign Battle of Bentonville

The 29th Missouri Infantry Regiment was an infantry regiment that served in the Union Army during the American Civil War.

== Service ==
The 29th Missouri Infantry Regiment was organized at Benton Barracks and St. Louis, Missouri July through October 1861 and mustered in for three years service under the command of Colonel John Smith Cavender.

The regiment was attached to Cape Girardeau, Department of the Missouri, to December 1862. 1st Brigade, 11th Division, XIII Corps, Department of the Tennessee, to December 1862. 1st Brigade, 4th Division, Sherman's Yazoo Expedition, December 22, 1862 to January 3, 1863. 1st Brigade, 1st Division, XV Corps, Army of the Tennessee, to December 1863. 2nd Brigade, 1st Division, XV Corps, to April 1864. 3rd Brigade, 1st Division, XV Corps, to September 1864. 1st Brigade, 1st Division, XV Corps, to November 1864. Unattached, XV Corps, to June 1865.

The regiment mustered out June 12, 1865 at Louisville, Kentucky.

== Detailed service ==
Moved to Cape Girardeau, Mo. by companies: Companies A, B, C, D, and E September 12; Companies F, G, and H September 22; Company I September 25, and Company K October 22, 1862. Duty at Cape Girardeau, Mo., until November 10, 1862. Moved to Patterson, Mo., November 10–17. Return to Cape Girardeau November 25–29. Moved to Helena, Ark., December 8–16. Sherman's Yazoo Expedition December 22, 1862 to January 3, 1863. Chickasaw Bayou December 26–28. Chickasaw Bluff December 29, Expedition to Arkansas Post, Ark., January 3–10, 1863. Assault and capture of Fort Hindman, Arkansas Post, January 10–11. Moved to Young's Point, La., January 17–22, and duty there until March. At Milliken's Bend until April. Expedition to Greenville, Black Bayou and Deer Creek April 2–14. Demonstration on Haines and Drumgould's Bluffs April 29-May 2. Moved to join the army in the rear of Vicksburg via Richmond and Grand Gulf May 2–14. Jackson, Miss., May 14. Siege of Vicksburg May 18-July 4. Assaults on Vicksburg May 19 and 22. Advance on Jackson, Miss., July 4–10. Siege of Jackson July 10–17 Bolton's Depot July 16. Briar Creek, near Clinton, July 17. Clinton July 18. At Big Black until September 27. Moved to Memphis, then marched to Chattanooga, Tenn., September 27-November 21. Operations on Memphis & Charleston Railroad October 20–29. Cherokee Station October 21 and 29. Cane Creek October 26. Tuscumbia October 26–27. Chattanooga-Ringgold Campaign November 23–27. Lookout Mountain November 23–24. Missionary Ridge November 25. Ringgold Gap, Taylor's Ridge, November 27. Moved to Bridgeport, Ala. December 2; then to Woodville, Ala., December 23, and duty there until March 20, 1864. At Cottonville until April 30. Atlanta Campaign May 1 to September 8. Demonstration on Resaca May 8–13. Battle of Resaca May 13–15. Advance on Dallas May 18–25. Battles about Dallas, New Hope Church, and Allatoona Hills May 25-June 5. Operations about Marietta and against Kennesaw Mountain June 10-July 2. Brush Mountain June 15–17. Assault on Kennesaw June 27. Nickajack Creek July 2–5. Chattahoochie River July 6–17. Battle of Atlanta July 22. Siege of Atlanta July 22-August 25. Ezra Chapel, Hood's 2nd Sortie, July 28. Flank movement on Jonesboro August 25–30. Battle of Jonesborough August 31-September 1. Lovejoy's Station September 2–6. Operations in northern Georgia and northern Alabama against Hood September 29-November 3. Ship's Gap, Taylor's Ridge, October 16. Regiment led the advance of XV Corps on the march to the sea November 15-December 10. Near Stockbridge November 15. Clinton November 22. Station 5, Georgia Central Railroad, December 4. Little Ogeechee River December 5. Siege of Savannah December 10–21. Carolinas Campaign January to April 1865. Hickory Hill, S.C., February 1. Angley's Post-office and Buford's Bridge February 4. Duncanville February 5. Fishburn's Plantation, near Lane's Bridge, Salkehatchie River, February 6. Cowpen's Ford, Little Salkehatchie River, February 6. Binnaker's Bridge, South Edisto River, February 9. Orangeburg February 11–12. Wolf's Plantation February 14. Congaree Creek February 15. Columbia February 16–17. Lynch's Creek February 26. Expedition to Florence and skirmishes March 4–6. Battle of Bentonville, N.C., March 20–21. Occupation of Goldsboro March 24. Advance on Raleigh April 10–14. Near Nahunta Station April 10. Beulah April 11. Occupation of Raleigh April 14. Bennett's House April 26. Surrender of Johnston and his army. Marched to Washington, D.C., via Richmond, Va., April 29-May 20. Grand Review of the Armies May 24. Moved to Louisville, Ky., June.

== Casualties ==
The regiment lost a total of 369 men during service; 7 officers and 68 enlisted men killed or mortally wounded, 3 officers and 291 enlisted men died of disease.

== Commanders ==
- Colonel John Smith Cavender - resigned February 19, 1863
- Colonel James Peckham - resigned March 9, 1864
- Colonel Joseph S. Gage

== See also ==
- Missouri Civil War Union units
- Missouri in the Civil War
