= 31st Missouri Infantry Regiment =

- Active: October 7, 1861, to July 18, 1865.
- Country: United States
- Allegiance: Union
- Branch: Infantry
- Engagements: Battle of Chickasaw Bayou; Battle of Chickasaw Bluffs; Battle of Fort Hindman; Battle of Jackson, Mississippi; Siege of Vicksburg (Including May 19 & 22, 1863 assaults); Siege of Jackson; Battle of Bolton's Depot; Battle of Canton; Battle of Cherokee Station; Battle of Cane Creek; Battle of Tuscumbia; Battle of Lookout Mountain; Battle of Missionary Ridge; Battle of Ringgold Gap; Battle of Taylor's Ridge; Battle of Resaca; Battle of Dallas; Battle of New Hope Church; Battle of Brushy Mountain; Battle of Kennesaw Mountain; Battle of Nickajack Creek; Chattahoochee River; Battle of Atlanta; Siege of Atlanta; Battle of Ezra Church; Battle of Jonesborough; Battle of Lovejoy's Station; Battle of Ship's Gap; 2nd Battle of Taylor's Ridge; Battle of Clinton; Battle of Statesboro; Ogeechee River; Siege of Savannah; Reconnaissance to Salkehatchie River; Battle of Hickory Hill; Salkehatchie Swamps; Battle of Columbia; Battle of Lynch's Creek; Battle of Bentonville

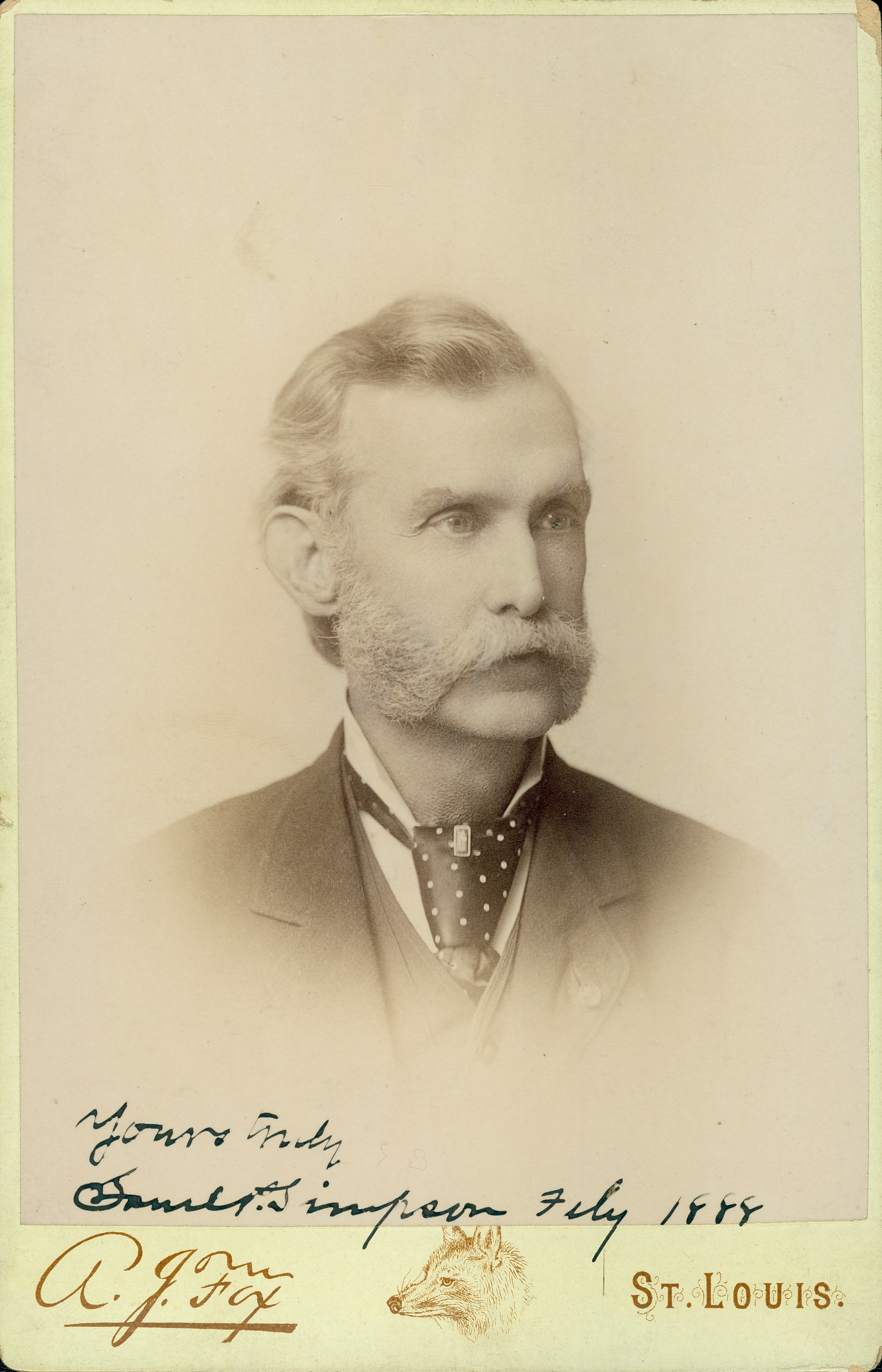
Lieutenant Colonel Samuel P. Simpson, 31st Missouri Volunteer Infantry

The 31st Missouri Infantry Regiment was an infantry regiment that served in the Union Army during the American Civil War.

== Service ==
The 31st Missouri Infantry Regiment was organized at St. Louis, Carondelet and Ironton, Missouri, from August 11 to October 7, 1862. Attached to Cape Girardeau, District of Missouri, Department of the Missouri, to December 1862. 1st Brigade, 11th Division, XIII Corps, Department of the Tennessee, December 1862. 1st Brigade, 4th Division, Sherman's Yazoo Expedition, to January 1863. 1st Brigade, 1st Division XV Corps, Army of the Tennessee, to December 1863. 2nd Brigade, 1st Division, XV Corps, to April 1864. 3rd Brigade, 1st Division, XV Corps to September 1864. 1st Brigade, 1st Division, XV Corps to July 1865.

== Detailed service ==
March to Patterson, Mo., October 21, 1862, and duty there till November 24. March to St. Genevieve, Mo., November 24, thence moved to Helena, Ark December 1. Sherman's Yazoo Expedition December 2, 1862, to January 3, 1863. Chickasaw Bayou December 26–28. Chickasaw Bluff December 29. Expedition Arkansas Post, Ark., January 3–10, 1863. Assault and capture of Fort Hindman, Arkansas Post, January 10–11. Moved to Young's Point, La., January 17–23, and duty there till March, and at Milliken's Bend till April. Expedition to Greenville, Black Bayou and Deer Creek April 2–14. Demonstrations on Haines' and Drumgould Bluffs April 29-May 2. Moved to join army in rear Vicksburg. Miss., via Richmond and Grand Gulf May 14. Mississippi Springs May 12. Jackson, Miss., May I Siege of Vicksburg May 18-July 4. Assaults on Vicksburg May 19 and 22. Advance on Jackson, Miss., July 4–10. Siege of Jackson July 10–17. Bolton's Depot July 16. Briar Creek, near Canton, July 17. Canton July 18. At Big Black to September 27. Moved to Memphis, Tenn.; thence march to Chattanooga, Tenn., September 27-November 21. Operations on Memphis & Charleston Railroad In Alabama October 20–29. Cherokee Station October 21 and 29. Cane Creek October 26. Tuscumbia October 26–27. Chattanooga-Ringgold Campaign November 23–27. Battles of Lookout Mountain November 23–24. Mission Ridge November 25. Ringgold Gap, Taylor's Ridge, November 27. Garrison duty in Alabama till May 1864. Clayton, Ala., March 14, 1864. Atlanta Campaign May 1-September 8. Demonstrations on Resaca May 8–13. Battle of Resaca May 13–15. Advance on Dallas May 18–25. Battles about Dallas, New Hope Church and Allatoona Hills May 25-June 5. Operations about Marietta and against Kenesaw Mountain June 10-July 2. Bushy Mountain June 15–17. Assault on Kenesaw June 27. Nickajack Creek July 2–5. Chattahoochie River July 6–17. Battle of Atlanta July 22. Siege of Atlanta July 22-August 25. Ezra Church, Hood's 2nd Sortie, July 28. Flank movement on Jonesboro August 25–30. Battle of Jonesboro August 31-September 1. Lovejoy Station September 2–6. Operations in North Georgia and North Alabama against Hood September 29-November 3. Ship's Gap, Taylor's Ridge, October 16. Consolidated with 32nd Missouri Volunteer Infantry November 12, 1864, as Consolidated Battalion 31st and 32nd Missouri Infantry. March to the sea November 15-December 10. Clinton November 23. Statesboro December 4. Ogeechee River December 7–9. Siege of Savannah December 10–21. Campaign of the Carolinas January–April 1865. Reconnaissance to Salkehatchie River January 25. Hickory Hill February 1. Salkehatchie Swamps, S. C., February 2–5. South Edisto River February 9. North Edisto River February 12–13. Columbia February 15–17. Lynch's Creek February 25–26. Battle of Bentonville, N. C., March 20–21. Occupation of Goldsboro March 24. Advance on Raleigh April 10–14. Occupation of Raleigh April 14. Bennett's House April 26. Surrender of Johnson and his army. March to Washington, D. C., via Richmond, Va., April 29-May 20. Grand Review May 24. moved to Louisville June. Battalion mustered out July 18, 1865.

== Casualties ==
Regiment lost during service 4 Officers and 51 Enlisted men killed and mortally wounded and 228 enlisted men by disease. Total 283

== Commanders ==
- Colonel Thomas C. Fletcher (Breveted Brigadier General of volunteers)
- Lieutenant colonel Samuel P. Simpson (Breveted Brigadier General of volunteers)
- Major Frederick Jaensen

== See also ==
- Missouri Civil War Union units
- Missouri in the Civil War
- 32nd Missouri Volunteer Infantry
