= E. John Ellis =

American politician (1840–1889)

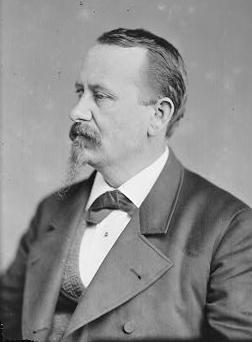
- Library of Congress

Member of the U.S. House of Representatives from Louisiana's 2nd district
- In office March 4, 1875 – March 3, 1885
- Preceded by: Lionel A. Sheldon
- Succeeded by: Michael Hahn

Member of the Louisiana Senate
- In office 1866-1870

Personal details
- Born: October 15, 1840 Covington, Louisiana
- Died: April 25, 1889 (aged 48) Washington, D.C.
- Resting place: Ellis Family Cemetery, Tangipahoa Parish, Louisiana
- Party: Democratic Party
- Profession: Lawyer

Military service
- Allegiance: Confederate States of America
- Branch/service: Confederate States Army
- Rank: Captain
- Unit: 16th Louisiana Infantry

Ezekiel John Ellis (October 15, 1840 – April 25, 1889) was a U.S. representative from Louisiana. He fought in the American Civil War for the Confederate States of America from 1861–1863; during the war he was promoted to the rank of captain. After the war, Ellis entered politics and was elected to the Louisiana State Senate from 1866-1870, then served in Congress from 1875-1885.

== Early life and military career ==
Born in Covington, St. Tammany Parish, Louisiana, son of Ezekiel Parke Ellis and Tabitha Emily Warner, Ellis attended private schools in Covington and Clinton, Louisiana, and Centenary College of Louisiana (when it was located in Jackson, Louisiana) from 1855 to 1858. In 1861 he graduated from the law department of the Louisiana State University at Pineville (now at Baton Rouge), Louisiana.

During the Civil War he joined the Confederate States Army and was commissioned a first lieutenant. Ellis was promoted to captain in the Sixteenth Regiment, Louisiana Infantry, and served two years until he was captured at the Battle of Missionary Ridge, Tennessee, about November 25, 1863. He was held as a prisoner of war on Johnson's Island in Lake Erie until the end of the war. While a prisoner, he wrote a diary entitled A Retrospect.

== Political career and later life ==
He was admitted to the bar of Louisiana in 1866 and commenced practice in Covington, Louisiana. He served as member of the State senate 1866-1870.

Ellis was elected from Louisiana's 2nd congressional district as a Democrat to the Forty-fourth and to the four succeeding Congresses (March 4, 1875 – March 3, 1885).

He served as chairman of the Committee on Mississippi Levees (Forty-fourth Congress) but declined to be a candidate for renomination in 1884.

He resumed the practice of his profession in Washington, D.C.

He died there April 25, 1889 and was interred in the Ellis family cemetery at "Ingleside," near Amite, Tangipahoa Parish, Louisiana.

== Notes ==
U.S. House of Representatives
Preceded by Lionel A. Sheldon	Member of the U.S. House of Representatives from Louisiana's 2nd congressional district March 4, 1875 – March 3, 1885	Succeeded by Michael Hahn
