= James Mann (1822–1868) =

American politician

Member of the U.S. House of Representatives from Louisiana's 2nd district
- In office July 18, 1868 – August 26, 1868
- Preceded by: Michael Hahn (1863)
- Succeeded by: Lionel A. Sheldon

Member of the Maine Senate from the 2nd district
- In office May 14, 1851 – January 5, 1853

Member of the Maine House of Representatives from Gorham
- In office May 9, 1849 – May 14, 1851
- Preceded by: Hugh D. McLellan
- Succeeded by: Jonathan Hanson

Personal details
- Born: June 22, 1822 Gorham, Maine, U.S.
- Died: August 26, 1868 (aged 46) New Orleans, Louisiana, U.S.
- Party: Democratic
- Occupation: Politician; treasury agent

Military service
- Branch/service: Union Army
- Rank: Major
- Unit: Paymaster
- Battles/wars: American Civil War

James Mann (June 22, 1822 – August 26, 1868) was a 19th-century American Civil War veteran and politician.

== Biography ==
James Mann was born on June 22, 1822, in Gorham, Maine. He served in the Maine legislature and was elected as a Democrat to the United States House of Representatives from Louisiana's 2nd congressional district but died just five weeks into his term in 1868.

Mann was a member of the Maine House of Representatives (1849–50) and Maine Senate (1851–53). He was a major in the Union Army during the American Civil War, serving as a paymaster.

After the war, he remained in New Orleans as a Treasury agent.

He was elected as part of Louisiana's next congressional delegation after the state was readmitted to representation. He took his seat on July 18, 1868, and died on August 26, 1868, in New Orleans.

The special election to succeed Mann was won by John Willis Menard, the first African American ever elected to Congress, but the House of Representatives declined to seat him.

== See also ==
- List of members of the United States Congress who died in office (1790–1899)

U.S. House of Representatives
Preceded by Michael Hahn (Vacant 1863–1868)	Member of the U.S. House of Representatives from Louisiana's 2nd congressional district July 18, 1868 – August 26, 1868	Succeeded by Lionel A. Sheldon
