= 32nd Missouri Infantry Regiment =

- Active: October 18, 1862 to July 18, 1865
- Country: United States
- Allegiance: Union
- Branch: Infantry
- Engagements: Yazoo Pass Expedition; Battle of Chickasaw Bayou; Battle of Chickasaw Bluff; Battle of Arkansas Post; Siege of Vicksburg, May 19 & May 22 assaults Siege of Jackson; Chattanooga campaign Battle of Lookout Mountain; Battle of Missionary Ridge; Atlanta campaign Battle of Resaca; Battle of Dallas; Battle of New Hope Church; Battle of Allatoona; Battle of Kennesaw Mountain; Battle of Atlanta; Siege of Atlanta; Battle of Jonesborough; Battle of Lovejoy's Station; Sherman's March to the Sea; Carolinas campaign Battle of Bentonville

== Service ==
The 32nd Missouri Infantry Regiment was organized at Benton Barracks October 18 through December 8, 1862.

The regiment was attached to District of Cape Girardeau, Missouri, Department of the Missouri, to December 1862. 1st Brigade, 11th Division, XIII Corps, Department of the Tennessee, December 1862. 1st Brigade, 4th Division, Sherman's Yazoo Expedition, to January 1863. 1st Brigade, 1st Division, XV Corps, Army of the Tennessee, to December 1863. 3rd Brigade, 1st Division, XV Corps, to September 1864. 1st Brigade, 1st Division, XV Corps, to July 1865.

The regiment mustered out July 18, 1865.

== Detailed service ==
=== 1862 ===
- Moved to Helena, Ark., December, 1862.
- Sherman's Yazoo Expedition December 22, 1862 to January 3, 1863.

=== 1863 ===
- Chickasaw Bayou December 26–28.
- Chickasaw Bluff December 29.
- Expedition to Arkansas Post, Ark., January 3–10, 1863.
- Assault and capture of Fort Hindman, Arkansas Post, January 10–11.
- Moved to Young's Point, La., January 17–23, and duty there until March.
- At Milliken's Bend, La., until April. Expedition to Greenville, Black Bayou and Deer Creek April 2–14.
- Demonstrations against Haines and Drumgould's Bluffs April 29-May 2.
- Moved to join the army in the rear of Vicksburg, Miss., May 2–14. Mississippi Springs May 12. Jackson, Miss., May 14.
- . Siege of Vicksburg May 18-July 4. Assaults on Vicksburg May 19 and 22. Advance on Jackson, Miss., July 4–10.
- Siege of Jackson July 10–17. Bolton's Depot July 16. Briar Creek, near Clinton, July 17. Clinton July 18.
- At Big Black until September 27.
- Moved to Memphis, Tenn., then marched to Chattanooga, Tenn., September 27-November 21. Operations on Memphis & Charleston Railroad in Alabama October 20–29. Cherokee Station October 21 and 29. Cane Creek October 26. Tuscumbia October 26–27.

Chattanooga-Ringgold Campaign November 23–27. Battles of Lookout Mountain November 23–24; Missionary Ridge November 25. Ringgold Gap, Taylor's Ridge, November 27.

=== 1864 ===
- Garrison duty in Alabama until May 1864.
- Atlanta Campaign May 1-September 8.
- Demonstration on Resaca May 8–13.
- Battle of Resaca May 13–15.
- Advance on Dallas May 18–25.
- Battles about Dallas, New Hope Church, and Allatoona Hills May 25-June 5.
- Operations about Marietta and against Kennesaw Mountain June 10-July 2, Bushy Mountain June 15–17.
- Assault on Kennesaw June 27. Nickajack Creek July 2–5. Chattahoochie River July 6–17.
- Battle of Atlanta July 22.
- Siege of Atlanta July 22-August 25. Ezra Chapel, Hood's 2nd Sortie, July 28.
- Flank movement on Jonesboro August 25–30.
- Battle of Jonesborough August 31-September 1.
- Lovejoy's Station September 2–6.
- Operations against Hood in northern Georgia and northern Alabama September 29-November 3. Ship's Gap, Taylor's Ridge, October 16.
- Consolidated to a battalion of three Companies November 11, 1864 and consolidated with three companies of the 31st Missouri Infantry as a consolidated battalion designated the 31st/32nd Missouri Infantry.
- March to the sea November 15-December 10.
  - Clinton November 23.
  - Statesboro December 4.
  - Ogeechee River December 7–9.
- Siege of Savannah December 10–21.

=== 1865 ===
Carolinas Campaign January to April 1865. Reconnaissance to Salkehatchie River January 25. Hickory Hill February 1. Salkehatchie Swamps, S.C., February 2–5. South Edisto River February 9. North Edisto River February 12–13. Columbia February 15–17. Lynch's Creek February 25–26. Battle of Bentonville, N.C., March 20–21. Occupation of Goldsboro March 24. Advance on Raleigh April 10–14. Occupation of Raleigh April 14. Bennett's House April 26. Surrender of Johnston and his army. March to Washington, D.C., via Richmond, Va., April 29-May 20. Grand Review of the Armies May 24. Moved to Louisville, Ky., June. Redesignated 32nd Regiment Missouri Infantry June 20.

== Casualties ==
The regiment lost a total of 434 men during service; 20 enlisted men killed or mortally wounded, 6 officers and 408 enlisted men died of disease.

== Commanders ==
- Colonel Francis H. Manter
- Lieutenant Colonel Henry Clay Warmoth
- Colonel Abraham Jefferson Seay

== Notable members ==
- 1st Lieutenant/Adjutant Joseph Parkinson Newsham - U.S. Congressman from Louisiana, 1868-1869 & 1870-1871
- Colonel Abraham Jefferson Seay - 2nd Governor of Oklahoma Territory, 1892-1893
- Lieutenant Colonel Henry Clay Warmoth - 23rd Governor of Louisiana, 1868-1872

== See also ==
- Missouri Civil War Union units
- Missouri in the Civil War
- 31st Missouri Volunteer Infantry
