= 3rd Missouri Infantry Regiment (Union) =

- Active: January 18, 1862, to November 23, 1864
- Country: United States
- Allegiance: Union
- Branch: Infantry
- Engagements: Camp Jackson affair Battle of Pea Ridge; Yazoo Pass Expedition; Chickasaw Bayou Expedition; Battle of Chickasaw Bluffs; Arkansas Post Expedition; Battle of Fort Hindman; Expedition to Greenville; Battle of Mississippi Springs; Battle of Jackson, Mississippi; Siege of Vicksburg (May 19 & May 22 Assaults); Siege of Jackson; Battle of Bolton Depot; Skirmish at Briar Creek; Battle of Canton; Battle at Cherokee Station; Battle at Cane Creek; Battle of Tuscumbia; Chattanooga campaign Battle of Lookout Mountain; Battle of Missionary Ridge; Battle of Ringgold Gap; Battle of Taylor's Ridge; Battle of Resaca; Battle of Dallas; Battle of New Hope Church; Battle of Allatoona; Battle of Brushy Mountain; Battle of Kennesaw Mountain; Battle of Nickajack Creek; Battle of the Chattahoochee River; Battle of Atlanta; Siege of Atlanta; Battle of Ezra Church; Battle of Jonesborough; Battle of Lovejoy's Station; Operations against Hood

The 3rd Missouri Infantry Regiment was an infantry regiment that served in the Union Army during the American Civil War. It arose from a group of volunteers who were active from April to September 1861.

== 3rd Missouri Volunteers ==
3rd Missouri Volunteer Infantry (3 Months) "Lyon's Fahnenwacht"
- Active: April 22, 1861, to September 4, 1861
- Country: United States
- Allegiance: Union
- Branch: Infantry
- Nickname: Lyon's Fahnenwacht (Lyon's Color Guard)
- Engagements: Camp Jackson Affair; Expedition to SW Missouri; Battle of Carthage; Battle of Wilson's Creek

The 3rd Missouri Volunteers evolved from one of several unofficial pro-Unionist militia units formed semi-secretly in St. Louis in the early months of 1861 by Congressman Francis Preston Blair Jr. and other Unionist (United States) activists. The organization that would become the Third Missouri was largely composed of ethnic Germans, who were generally opposed to slavery and strongly supportive of the Unionist cause. Although initially without any official standing, beginning on April 22, 1861, four militia regiments Blair helped organize were sworn into Federal service at the St. Louis Arsenal by Captain John Schofield acting on the authority of President Lincoln.

Upon entry into federal service, the members of the new Third Missouri elected Franz Sigel colonel of the regiment. The new Missouri Volunteer regiments, subsequently elected (then) Captain Nathaniel Lyon as the brigadier general of the new brigade of Missouri volunteers. President Lincoln would later confirm Lyon's promotion from Captain to Brigadier general.

The regiment, composed almost completely of ethnic Germans, was unusually large, with ten infantry companies and two rifle companies.

=== Military service ===
On May 10, 1861, the Third Missouri under Colonel Blair and Lieutenant Colonel Franz Hassendeubel participated in the arrest of the Missouri Volunteer Militia drilling at Camp Jackson at Lindell Grove on the western border of St. Louis City. As the Missouri militiamen were being march under guard back to the Arsenal near the riverfront, angry crowds confronted the Federal forces and the confused situation soon devolved into rioting and gunfire. Over 27 people were killed and the Camp Jackson Affair helped to polarize the state and send Missouri down the road to its own internal civil war.

After June 12, 1861, the Third Missouri was part of a complex movement against the Missouri State Guard. One force, under Brigadier General Lyon moved up the Missouri River by steamer, to capture the State capital at Jefferson City. A second brigade, composed of the 3rd and 5th Missouri and two batteries of artillery moved into Southwest Missouri under the overall command of Colonel Sigel, to cut off any Missouri State Guard troops which might move south before Lyon's advance.

Colonel Sigel took his force to Rolla, thence to Springfield, Missouri, arriving on June 25. They marched to Neosho (June 26–30) and were forced to retreat to Mount Vernon in the face of a large force of State Guardsmen. Two companies of the Third Missouri who formed Sigel's rear guard were captured covering the retreat.

On July 5, Sigel's force of 1,100 troops met 4,000 State Guardsmen (and 2,000 unarmed Guard recruits) at the Battle of Carthage. Confronted with the large force of Guardsmen Sigel retreated in good order into Carthage and successfully disengaged and retreated to Sarcoxie that night.

The Third Missouri joined with General Lyon's force at Springfield, and participated in the August 10 Battle of Wilson's Creek. The Third was again part of a brigade (with the Fifth Missouri) under Colonel Sigel. Sigel's 2nd Brigade initially had significant success, attacking the Confederate cavalry on the southeast corner of the southern camps (at the Sharp Farm). After driving off these southern troops, Sigel halted his brigade across the Wire Road, above Skeeg's Branch (Creek). However, Sigel positioned his artillery badly (behind the military crest of the ridge) and cautioned his men against accidentally firing on Federal troops he expected to be advancing south down the Wire Road (the 1st Iowa Infantry was uniformed in gray). At this point, Confederate Brigadier Ben McCulloch lead an attack south down the Wire Road, with the respected Third Louisiana Infantry in fore. Skirmishers, officers, and Sigel himself mistook the Louisiana troops for the Iowa infantry allowing them to advance to point blank range before delivering a devastating volley into the confused Federal troops. Sigel shouted "they make a mistake" as his brigade was overrun.

The majority of the shattered Third Missouri escaped, and eventually they rejoined the Federal force retreating to Springfield, and then back to Rolla. From there the regiment was ordered back to St. Louis to be demobilized.

All the companies of the regiment were mustered out by September 4, 1861. Elements of the 3rd Missouri Volunteers (3 Months Service) were incorporated in the new 3rd Missouri Volunteer Infantry (3 Years Service) under Colonel Isaac F. Shephard.

== Regiment service ==
The 3rd Missouri Infantry Regiment was organized at Saint Louis, Missouri, September 3, 1861, to January 18, 1862. Attached to the 2nd Brigade, Army of Southwest Missouri, to February, 1862. Unassigned, Army, of Southwest Missouri, to May, 1862. 3rd Division, Army of Southwest Missouri, to July, 1862. District of Eastern Arkansas, Dept. of Missouri, to November, 1862. 1st Brigade, 1st Division, District of Eastern Arkansas, to December, 1862. 1st Brigade, 11th Division, Right Wing 13th Army Corps (Old), Dept. of the Tennessee, to December, 1862. 2nd Brigade, 4th Division, Sherman's Yazoo Expedition, to January, 1863. 2nd Brigade, 1st Division, 15th Army Corps, Army of the Tennessee, to September, 1863. 1st Brigade, 1st Division, 15th Army Corps, to December, 1863. 3rd Brigade, 1st Division, 15th Army Corps, to November, 1864.

=== Detailed history ===
Four Companies moved to Rolla, Missouri in January 1862 and joined the army of General Samuel R. Curtis. Two Companies at Alton, Ill., until March, 1862; then joined four Companies at Benton Barracks; then Join Regiment at Cassville, Missouri. Curtis's Campaign against Confederate General Sterling Price in Missouri and Arkansas in January to March, 1862. The advance on Springfield, Mo., February 2–11. The pursuit of Price into Arkansas February 14–29. The Battles of Pea Ridge, Ark, March 6, 7 and 8. March to Batesville, Ark., April 5-May 3. Searcy Landing, Little Red River, May 19 (Co. "B"). March to Helena, Ark., May 25-July 14. The expedition from Searcy Landing to West Point, Searcy and Bayou des Arc May 27. The expedition from Helena to north of White River August 5–8. Moved to Ironton and Pilot Knob, Mo., September 1. To St. Genevieve November 12, and return to Helena on November 23. Duty there until December 22. Sherman's Yazoo Expedition December 22, 1862, to January 3, 1863. Chickasaw Bayou December 26–28. Chickasaw Bluff December 29. The Expedition to Arkansas Post, Ark., January 3–10, 1863. The assault and capture of Fort Hindman, Arkansas Post, January 10–11. Moved to Young's Point, La., January 17–23, and duty there until March. At Milliken's Bend until April. The Expedition to Greenville, Black Bayou and Deer Creek April 2–14. The demonstration on Haines and Drumgould's Bluffs April 29-May 2. Moved to join army in rear of Vicksburg, Miss., via Richmond and Grand Gulf May 2–14. Mississippi Springs May 12–13. The Battle of Jackson, Miss., May 14. The siege of Vicksburg May 18-July 4. The assaults on Vicksburg May 19 and 22. The Surrender of Vicksburg July 4. The advance on Jackson, Miss., July 5–10. Siege of Jackson July 10–17. Bolton Depot July 16. Briar Creek, near Canton, July 17. Canton July 18. Camp at Big Black until September 27. Moved to Memphis, Tenn., thence march to Chattanooga, Tenn., September 27-November 21. The operations on Memphis & Charleston Railroad in Alabama October 20–29. Cherokee Station October 21 and 29. Cane Creek October 26. Tuscumbia October 26–27. The Battles of Chattanooga November 23–27; Lookout Mountain November 23–24; Mission Ridge November 25; Ringgold Gap, Taylor's Ridge, November 27. Garrison duty at Woodville and Scottsboro, Ala., and Cleveland, Tenn., until May, 1864. Atlanta (Ga.) Campaign May 1-September 8. The demonstration on Resaca May 8–13. The Battle of Resaca May 14–15. The Advance on Dallas May 18–25. The Battles about Dallas, New Hope Church and Allatoona Hills May 25-June 5. Operations about Marietta and against Kenesaw Mountain June 10-July 2. Brushy Mountain June 15–17. The assault on Kenesaw June 27 Nickajack Creek July 2–5. Chattahoochie River July 6–17. Battle of Atlanta July 22. Siege of Atlanta July 22-August 25. Ezra Chapel, Hood's 2nd Sortie, July 28. The flank movement on Jonesboro August 25–30. The Battle of Jonesboro August 31-September 1. Lovejoy Station September 2–6. The operations against Hood in North Alabama and North Georgia October 1–26. Mustered out by Companies. Company "B" September 5, Company "K" September 5, Company "C" September 28, Companies "E" and "F" October 17, Company "H" November 2, Company "G" November 3, Company "I" November 16 and Company "D" November 23, 1864. The regiment's veterans and recruits were transferred to the 15th Missouri Volunteer Infantry.

=== Casualties ===
The regiment lost many casualties during service in the duration of the war which are listed consisting of; 3 officers and 89 enlisted men killed and mortally wounded as well as 3 officers and 145 enlisted men by disease with a combined number of casualties totalling 240.

== Flag ==
In September 1861, a German-American militia in San Francisco named the "California Fusiliers," wanted to honor the regiments service, so they raised funds to purchased a flag. It was an American flag with 34 golden stars bearing the inscription of the California militia: "Our Adopted Country, Right or Wrong." The whole thing measured 6 x 9 feet.

== See also ==
- Missouri Civil War Union units
- Missouri in the Civil War
