= George A. Stone =

American general and merchant

George Augustus Stone
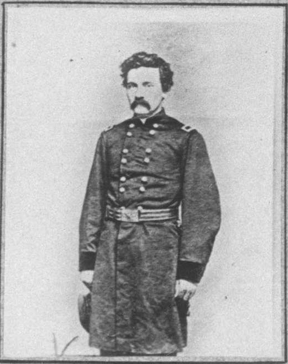
- Born: October 13, 1834; Schoharie, New York, United States
- Died: May 26, 1901 (aged 66); Burlington, Iowa, United States
- Burial place: Forest Home Cemetery, Mount Pleasant, Iowa, United States
- Military career
- Allegiance: United States (Union)
- Branch: United States Army (Union Army)
- Service years: 1861 – 1865
- Rank: Colonel; Bvt. Brigadier General
- Commands: 25th Iowa Infantry Regiment
- Conflicts: American Civil War: Operations to Control Missouri; Battle of Wilson's Creek; Vicksburg campaign; Battle of Chickasaw Bayou; Battle of Arkansas Post; Chattanooga campaign; Battle of Ringgold Gap; Campaign of the Carolinas; Battle of Cox's Bridge; Battle of Bentonville

George Augustus Stone (1834-1901) was an American Brevet Brigadier General who participated in the American Civil War. He was known for commanding the 25th Iowa Infantry Regiment throughout the regiment's entire service throughout the war.

== Early years ==
Stone was born on October 13, 1834, at Schoharie, New York. In 1839, his father moved the family to Iowa Territory around Washington County, Iowa where Stone would attend school before going to Mount Pleasant, Iowa in 1849 to complete his studies. Stone then attended the Iowa Wesleyan University but before he graduated, he was presented an opportunity to be the cashier of the First National Bank of Mount Pleasant and accepted the job, remaining there until Spring 1861 when the American Civil War began.

== American Civil War ==
Stone left his banking career in order to enlist in the 1st Iowa Infantry Regiment on May 14, 1861, as a first lieutenant in Company F of the regiment and first experienced active military combat at the Battle of Wilson's Creek. He was then commissioned for the 4th Iowa Cavalry Regiment on December 26, 1861, where he would remain until August 10, 1862, when he was transferred to the newly formed 25th Iowa Infantry Regiment, later promoted to full colonel of the regiment on September 27 of the same year. The 25th Iowa then participated in the Vicksburg campaign, participating at the Battle of Chickasaw Bayou and the Battle of Arkansas Post. Stone then participated in the Chattanooga campaign with the 25th Iowa gaining fame for their service at the Battle of Ringgold Gap but after the battle, Stone was given the command of the Iowa Brigade of the XV Corps and Lieut.-Col. D. J. Palmer took command of the 25th Iowa. Stone then participated at the Campaign of the Carolinas, particularly serving at the Capture of Columbia, capturing 40 pieces of artillery, 5,000 weapons and 200 prisoners but was then unjustly charged for participating in the burning of the city on the night following the surrender despite Stone himself finding the burning to be deplorable. Despite this however, Stone went on to participate at the Battle of Cox's Bridge and the Battle of Bentonville Stone was brevetted Brigadier General on March 13, 1865, for "Faithful and Meritorious Services." Stone then participated in the Grand Review of the Armies before being returning to Davenport, Iowa where Stone and the 25th Iowa were mustered out on June 6, 1865.

=== Later years ===
Stone returned to Mount Pleasant where he got his job back there before going to Ottumwa and Rulo, Nebraska where he engaged in being a merchant. He was also an active member of the Grand Army of the Republic and the Military Order of the Loyal Legion of the United States. He was so successful at this that Grover Cleveland himself appointed Stone as the National Bank Examiner of Iowa where Stone remained for the rest of his life until May 26, 1901. He was buried at Forest Home Cemetery, Mount Pleasant.

== See also ==
- List of American Civil War brevet generals (Union)
