= 25th Iowa Infantry Regiment =

- Iowa state flag
- Active: September 27, 1862, to June 6, 1865
- Country: United States
- Allegiance: Union
- Branch: Infantry
- Engagements: American Civil War: Battle of Fort Hindman; Siege of Vicksburg; Battle of Lookout Mountain; Battle of Missionary Ridge; Battle of Resaca; Battle of Kennesaw Mountain; Battle of Atlanta; Battle of Jonesboro; March to the Sea

The 25th Iowa Infantry Regiment was an infantry regiment that served in the Union Army during the American Civil War.

== Service ==
The 25th Iowa Infantry was organized at Mount Pleasant, Iowa and mustered in for three years of Federal service on September 27, 1862. Upon completion of training, they embarked on riverboats at Keokuk, Iowa, to be taken south to Helena, Ar., to participate in the Vicksburg Campaign.

Timeline:

Expedition from Helena to mouth of White River, November 17-24, 1862.

Sherman's Yazoo Expedition December 22, 1862, to January 2, 1863.

Chickasaw Bayou December 26-28, 1862.

*Chickasaw Bluff December 29.

Expedition to Arkansas Post, Ark., January 3-10, 1863.

*Assault on and capture of Fort Hindman, Arkansas Post, January 10-11.

Moved to Young's Point, La., January 17-23, and duty there till April.

Expedition to Greenville, Black Bayou and Deer Creek April 2-14.

Demonstration against Haines and Snyder's Bluff April 28-May 2.

Moved to join army in rear of Vicksburg, Miss., via Richmond and Grand Gulf May 2-14.

*Jackson May 14.

Siege of Vicksburg May 18-July 4.

*Assaults on Vicksburg May 19 and 22.

Advance on Jackson, Miss., July 5-10.

Siege of Jackson July 10-17.

^Briar Creek near Canton July 17.

^Canton July 18.

Duty at Big Black till September 22.

Moved to Memphis, thence march to Chattanooga, Tenn., September 22-November 21.

Operations on Memphis & Charleston Railroad in Alabama October 10-29.

^Cherokee Station October 21 and 29.

^Cane Creek October 26.

^Tuscumbia (Little Bear Creek) October 26-27.

Battles of Chattanooga November 23-27.

* Lookout Mountain November 23-24.

*Mission Ridge November 25. *Ringgold Gap, Taylor's Ridge, November 27.

March to relief of Knoxville November 28-December 8.

Garrison duty in Alabama until May, 1864.

Atlanta (Ga.) Campaign May 1 to September 8.

Demonstration on Resaca May 8-13.

Snake Creek Gap May 10-12.

*Battle of Resaca May 14-15.

Operations on Pumpkin Vine Creek and battles about Dallas, New Hope Church and Allatoona Hills May 25-June 5.

Operations about Marietta and against Kenesaw Mountain June 10-July 2.

^Bushy Mountain June 15-17.

*Assault on Kenesaw June 27.

^Nickajack Creek (Ruff’s Mill) July 2-5.

Chattahoochee River July 6-17.

*Battle of Atlanta July 22.

Siege of Atlanta July 22-August 25.

^Ezra Chapel, Hood's second sortie, July 28.

Flank movement on Jonesboro August 25-30.

*Battle of Jonesboro August 31-September 1.

Lovejoy Station September 2-6.

Pursuit of Hood into Alabama October 1-26.

March to the sea November 15-December 10.

^Clinton November 22.

^Griswoldsville November 23.

^Statesboro December 4.

Siege of Savannah December 10-21.

Campaign of the Carolinas January to April, 1865.

Reconnaissance to Salkehatchie River, S. C., January 25.

^Salkehatchie Swamps, S. C., February 3-5.

^ South Edisto River February 9.

^North Edisto River February 12-13.

^Columbia February 15-17.

^Lynch's Creek February 25-26.

*Battle of Bentonville, N. C., March 20-21.

Occupation of Goldsboro March 24.

Advance on Raleigh April 9-13.

Occupation of Raleigh April 14.

Bennett's House April 26.

Surrender of Johnston and his army.

March to Washington, D. C., via Richmond, Va., April 29-May 20.

Grand Review May 24.

Mustered out June 6, 1865.

^ Denotes a minor battle *Denotes a major battle

== Total strength and casualties ==
A total of 1136 men served in the 25th Iowa at one time or another during its existence. It suffered 2 officers and 63 enlisted men who were killed in action or who died of their wounds and 2 officers and 207 enlisted men who died of disease, for a total of 274 fatalities.

== Commanders ==
- Colonel George A. Stone

== See also ==
- List of Iowa Civil War Units
- Iowa in the American Civil War
