= Battery B, 1st Illinois Light Artillery Regiment =

- Illinois flag
- Active: May 2, 1861 to July 23, 1864
- Country: United States
- Allegiance: Union
- Branch: Artillery
- Engagements: Battle of Belmont; Battle of Shiloh; Battle of Arkansas Post; Battle of Jackson; Battle of Champion Hill; Siege of Vicksburg; Battle of Missionary Ridge; Battle of Resaca; Battle of Kennesaw Mountain

Battery B, 1st Illinois Light Artillery Regiment was an artillery battery that served in the Union Army during the American Civil War.

== Service ==
Battery B was mustered into service at Chicago, Illinois on May 2, 1861, for three months' service. The battery was re-mustered for three years service at Cairo, Illinois on July 16, 1861.

The battery was mustered out on July 23, 1864, at Chicago, Illinois. Veterans and recruits were transferred to Battery A, 1st Illinois Light Artillery Regiment. The battery was recreated in March, 1865 by the redesignation of Bridges' Battery Illinois Light Artillery.

== Total strength and casualties ==
The battery suffered 9 enlisted men who were killed in action or who died of their wounds and 1 officer and 17 enlisted men who died of disease, for a total of 27 fatalities.

== Commanders ==
- Captain Ezra Taylor - promoted to major.
- Captain Samuel Eddy Barrett - promoted to major.
- Captain Israel P. Rumsey - Mustered out with the battery.

== Flag ==
The battery was presented with a flag at Chicago's armory on May 14, 1861. It was a large flag made of silk containing and illustration of a mounted cannon in the middle of its field.

== See also ==
- List of Illinois Civil War Units
- Illinois in the American Civil War
