= Samuel Eddy Barrett =

American businessman

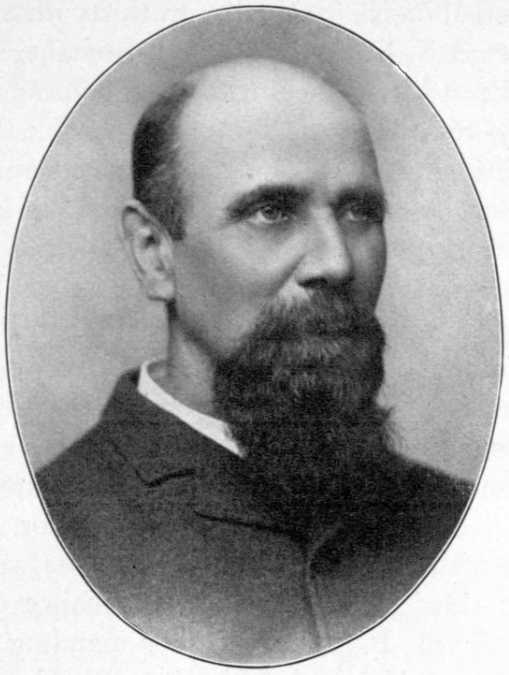
- Born: May 16, 1834; Cambridgeport, Massachusetts, US
- Died: December 30, 1912 (aged 78); Baltimore, Maryland, US
- Burial place: Graceland Cemetery
- Occupation(s): Industrialist, military officer
- Spouse: Alice D. Brush (m. 1868)
- Children: 6

Samuel Eddy Barrett (1834–1912) was a Chicago industrialist and major in the American Civil War.

== Biography ==
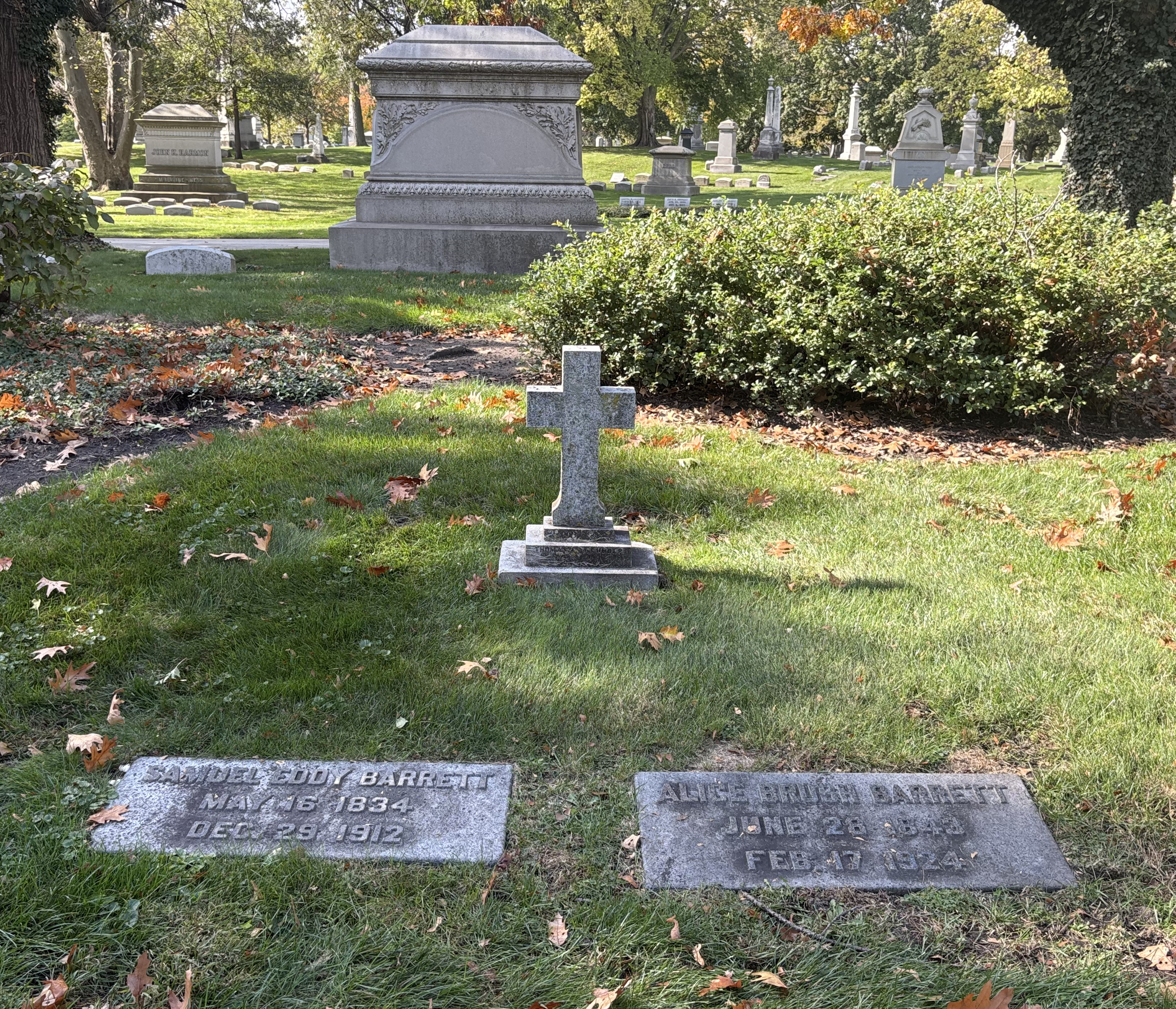
Graves of Samuel and Alice Barrett at Graceland Cemetery

Samuel Eddy Barrett was born on May 16, 1834 in Cambridgeport, Massachusetts. He moved to Chicago, Illinois and in 1857 founded the manufacturing firm Barrett, Powell & Arnold, which later became S.E. Barrett Manufacturing Company. He volunteered in the 1st Illinois Artillery Regiment, commanding its Company B. He was promoted to major in 1863.

Barrett married Alice D. Brush on May 20, 1868, and had six children. He worked with S.E. Barrett Manufacturing Company (later Barrett Manufacturing Company) until his death, while simultaneously acting as the head of the American Coal Products Company starting in 1903.

Barrett died in Baltimore on December 30, 1912. He was buried at Graceland Cemetery in Chicago.
