= Dennis T. Kirby =

Civil War Soldier (Union)

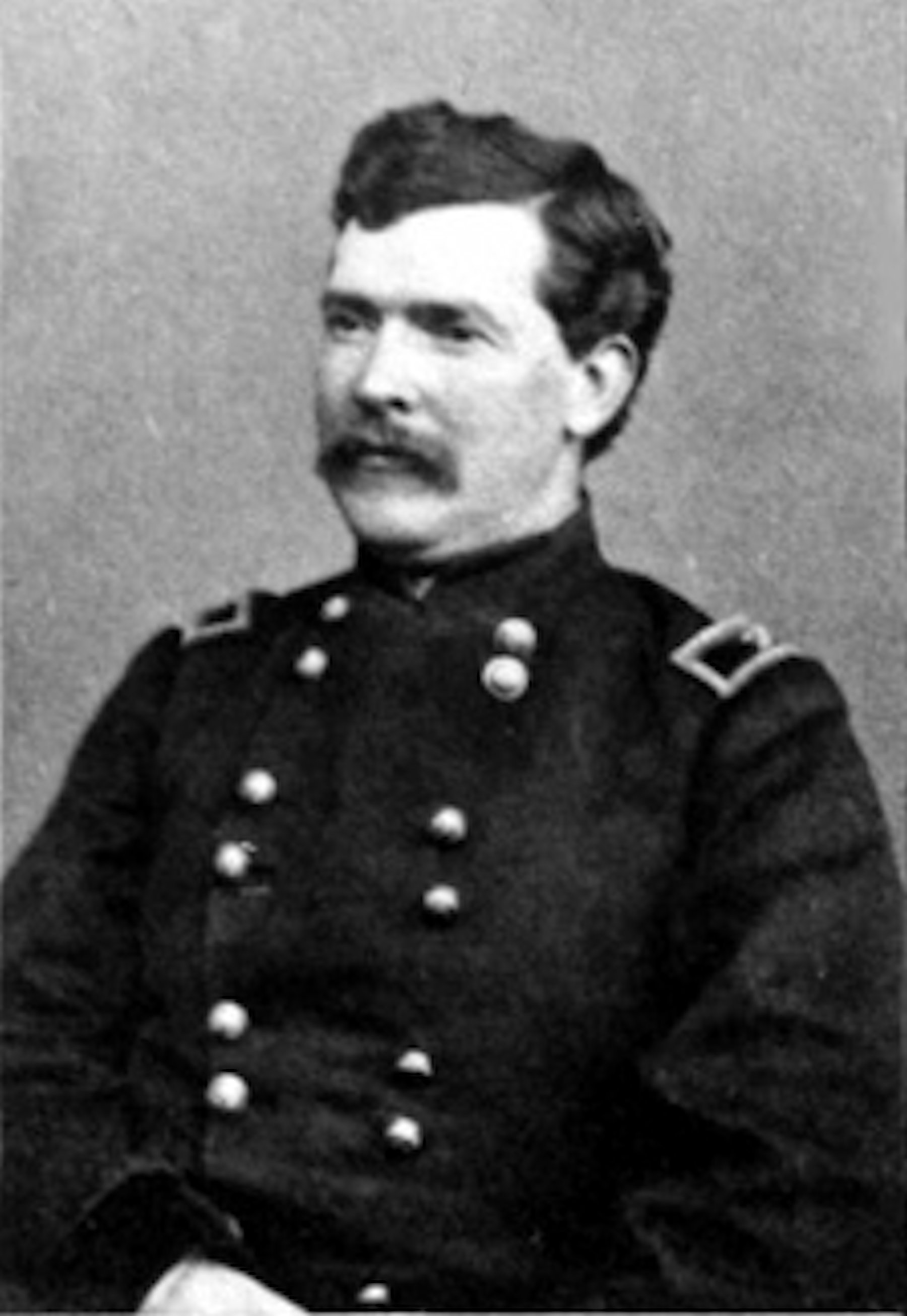
- Born: September 15, 1835; Niagara Falls, New York, US
- Died: April 18, 1922 (aged 86); Washington, D.C., US
- Burial place: Arlington National Cemetery
- Military career
- Allegiance: United States
- Branch: United States Army; Union Army
- Rank: Major; Brevet Brigadier General
- Unit: 8th Missouri Infantry Regiment
- Conflicts: American Civil War: Siege of Vicksburg
- Awards: Medal of Honor

Dennis Thomas Kirby (September 15, 1835 – April 18, 1922) was a Union Army soldier in the American Civil War who received the U.S. military's highest decoration, the Medal of Honor.

Brevet Brigadier General Dennis T. Kirby was born in Niagara County, New York, September 15, 1837, and moved with his parents to Buffalo, New York, in 1847, and to St. Louis, Missouri, in 1854.

He entered the service as captain, Company E, Eighth, Missouri Volunteer Infantry, June 25, 1861. He served in Missouri and Kentucky to February 1862. He was promoted lieutenant-colonel August 3, 1863.

He was mustered out with the regiment July 7, 1864, and then commissioned colonel and aide-de-camp on the staff of Governor W. P. Hall, of Missouri, and colonel of Fifth Regiment St. Louis City Guard, October 1, 1864. He was then commissioned lieutenant-colonel of the Twenty-Seventh Missouri Volunteer Infantry, October 6, 1864, and at once detailed as chief picket officer of the Seventeenth Army Corps, on the staff of Major General [Frank P. Blair], commanding.

He was on the March to the Sea November 16 to December 13. He was brevetted colonel and brigadier-general for gallant and meritorious services during the war, to date from November 13, 1863; and present at the surrender of General Joseph Johnston, and in the grand review at Washington.

He was appointed captain of Company E, Thirty-Ninth United States Infantry, July 28, 1866, and brevetted major for gallant conduct at Chickasaw Bayou, lieutenant-colonel for gallant conduct in the assaults on Vicksburg, and colonel, United States Army for gallant and meritorious conduct at Chickamauga Creek, Georgia, Mission Ridge, Tennessee, and Bivers Bridge, South Carolina. He served in the regular army until the fall of 1868, when his services ended. He then resided in Washington, D. C.

He was awarded the Medal of Honor, for extraordinary heroism during the Siege of Vicksburg, while serving as a major of the 8th Missouri Infantry. His Medal of Honor was issued on January 31, 1894.

Kirby died on April 18, 1922, and was buried at the Arlington National Cemetery in Arlington County, Virginia.

== Medal of Honor citation ==
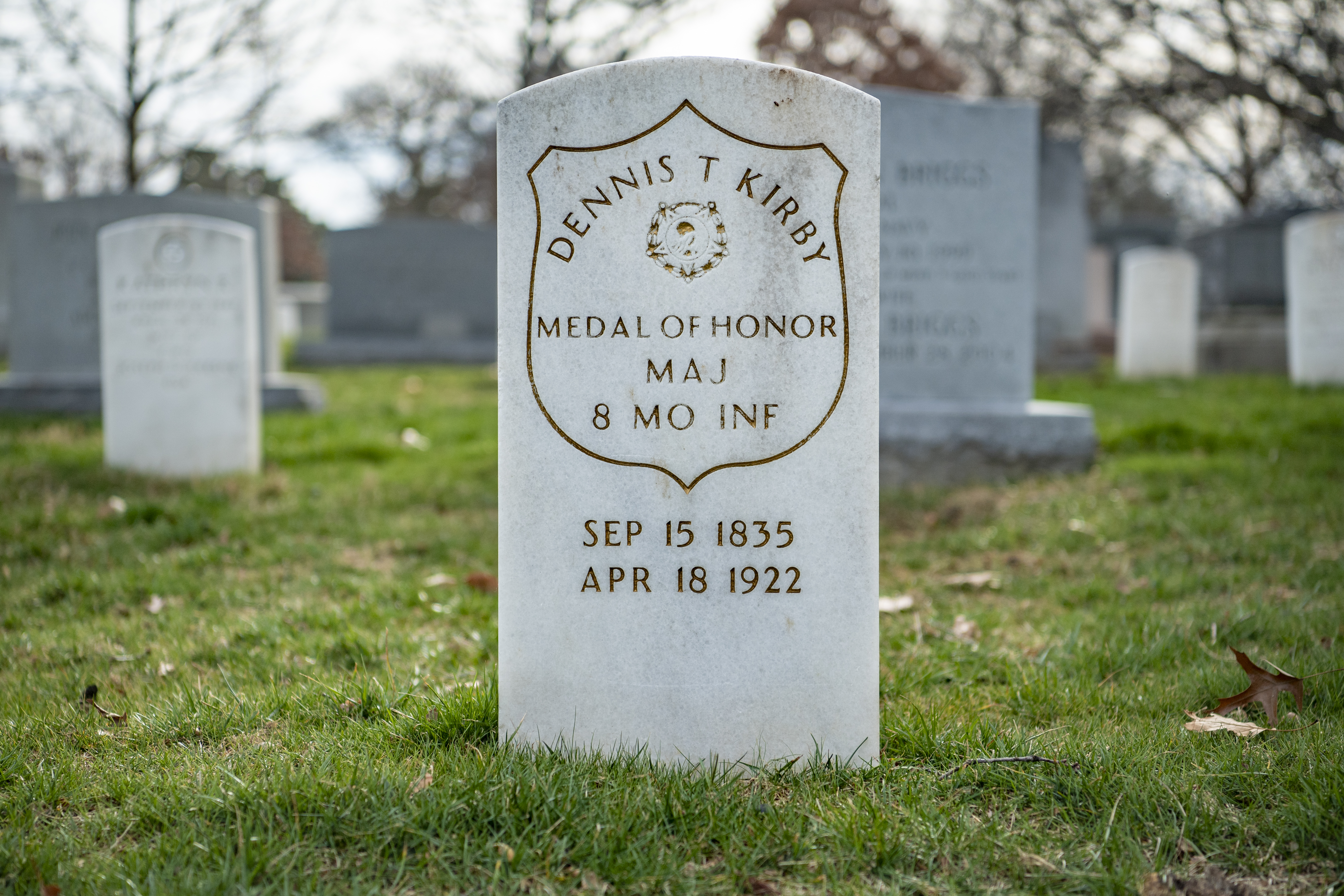
Grave at Arlington National Cemetery

The President of the United States of America, in the name of Congress, takes pleasure in presenting the Medal of Honor to Major Dennis Thomas Kirby, United States Army, for extraordinary heroism on 22 May 1863, while serving with 8th Missouri Infantry, in action at Vicksburg, Mississippi. Major Kirby seized the colors when the Color Bearer was killed and bore them himself in the assault.
