= 96th Ohio Infantry Regiment =

- Active: August 29, 1862, to July 7, 1865
- Country: United States
- Allegiance: Union
- Branch: Infantry
- Engagements: Battle of Chickasaw Bayou; Battle of Arkansas Post; Battle of Port Gibson; Battle of Champion Hill; Vicksburg Campaign; Siege of Vicksburg; Siege of Jackson; Battle of Bayou Bourbeux; Red River Campaign; Battle of Sabine Cross Roads; Siege of Fort Gaines; Siege of Fort Morgan; Battle of Fort Blakeley

The 96th Ohio Infantry Regiment, sometimes 96th Regiment, Ohio Volunteer Infantry (or 96th OVI) was an infantry regiment in the Union Army during the American Civil War.

== Service ==
The 96th OVI was organized at Camp Delaware in Delaware, Ohio and mustered in for three years service on August 29, 1862, under the command of Colonel Joseph W. Vance.

The regiment was attached to 2nd Brigade, 2nd Division, Army of Kentucky, Department of the Ohio, to October 1862. 1st Brigade, 1st Division, Army of Kentucky, to November 1862. 1st Brigade, Right Wing, XIII Corps, Department of the Tennessee, to December 1862. 1st Brigade, 1st Division, Sherman's Yazoo Expedition, to January 1862. 1st Brigade, 10th Division, XIII Corps, Army of the Tennessee, to August 1863. 1st Brigade, 4th Division, XIII Corps, Army of the Tennessee and Army of the Gulf, to March 1864. 2nd Brigade, 4th Division, XIII Corps, to June 1864. 3rd Brigade, 3rd Division, XIX Corps, Department of the Gulf, to December 1864. U.S. forces, mouth of White River, Reserve Corps, Military Division West Mississippi, to February 1865. 1st Brigade, 3rd Division, Reserve Corps, February 1865. 1st Brigade, 3rd Division, XIII Corps, Military Division West Mississippi, to July 1865.

When the 42nd OVI mustered out in late 1864, having completed its term of service, its veterans and recruits were transferred to the 96th OVI. On November 18, 1864, the 96th OVI was consolidated into a battalion of five companies. The 96th OVI mustered out of service at Mobile, Alabama, on July 7, 1865.

== Detailed service ==
Ordered to Cincinnati, Ohio, September 1, then to Covington and Newport, Ky., September 3, and duty there during threatened attack on Cincinnati by Edmund Kirby Smith. Moved to Falmouth, Ky., October 8, 1862, then to Nicholasville October 23. Moved to Louisville, Ky., then to Memphis, Tenn., November 13–22. Sherman's Yazoo Expedition December 20, 1862, to January 3, 1863. Landed at Milliken's Bend, La., and expedition to Dallas Station, on Vicksburg & Shreveport Railroad, and destruction of railroad and stores December 25–26, 1862. Chickasaw Bayou December 26–28. Chickasaw Bluff December 29. Expedition to Arkansas Post, Ark., January 3–10, 1863. Assault and capture of Fort Hindman, Arkansas Post, January 10–11. Moved to Young's Point January 17, and duty there until March 10. Expedition to Greenville, Miss., and Cypress Bend, Ark., February 14–26. Moved to Milliken's Bend, La., March 10, and duty there until April 25. Movement on Bruinsburg, Mississippi and turning Grand Gulf April 25–30. Battle of Magnolia Hills, Port Gibson, Miss., May 1. Battle of Champion Hill May 16. Siege of Vicksburg, Miss., May 18-July 4. Assaults on Vicksburg May 19 and 22. Advance on Jackson, Miss., July 4–10. Siege of Jackson July 10–17. Camp at Vicksburg until August 26. Ordered to New Orleans, La., August 26. Expedition from Carrollton to New and Amite Rivers September 24–29. At Brashear City October 3. Western Louisiana Campaign October 3-November 30. Grand Coteau November 3. Moved to Algiers December 13, thence embark for Texas December 18. Duty at Du Crow's Point, Texas, until March 1864. Moved to Algiers, La., March 1–6. Red River Campaign March 10-May 22. Advance from Franklin to Alexandria March 14–26. Skirmish at Bayou de Paul, Carroll's Mills, April 8. Battle of Sabine Cross Roads April 8. Monett's Bluff, Cane River Crossing, April 23. Operations about Alexandria April 26-May 13. Construction of dam at Alexandria April 30-May 10. Retreat to Morganza May 13–20. Mansura May 16. Moved to Baton Rouge May 28, and duty there until July 20. Moved to Algiers July 20, then to Dauphin Island, Ala. Operations in Mobile Bay against Forts Gaines and Morgan August 2–23. Siege and capture of Fort Gaines August 3–8. Siege of capture of Fort Morgan August 9–23. Moved to Morganza September 1. Raid to Greenville Farms September 4. Moved to mouth of White River November 1, and duty there until February 4, 1865. Consolidated to four Companies November 18, 1864. Moved to Kennersville, La., February 4, 1865, then to Mobile Point February 16. Campaign against Mobile and its defenses March 17-April 13. Siege of Spanish Fort and Fort Blakely March 26-April 8. Assault and capture of Fort Blakely April 9. Occupation of Mobile April 12. Expedition to Tombigbee River and Macintosh Bluffs April 13-May 9. Duty at Mobile until July.

== Casualties ==
The regiment lost a total of 339 men during service; 2 officers and 46 enlisted men killed or mortally wounded, 5 officers and 286 enlisted men died of disease.

== Commanders ==
- Colonel Joseph W. Vance, killed April 8, 1864, at Battle of Sabine Cross Roads, Louisiana.
- Lieutenant Colonel Albert Handel Brown, took command upon the death of Colonel Joseph W. Vance, mustered out with regiment on July 7, 1865.

== See also ==
- List of Ohio Civil War units
- Ohio in the Civil War
