= Lionel Allen Sheldon =

American politician (1828–1917)

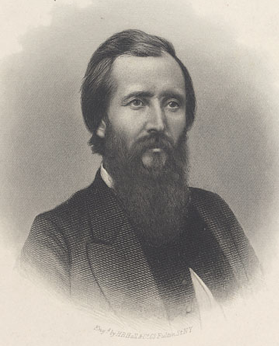
- Lionel Allen Sheldon. Engraving by H.B. Hall

11th Governor of New Mexico Territory
- In office March 9, 1881 – May 4, 1885
- Appointed by: James A. Garfield
- Preceded by: Lewis Wallace
- Succeeded by: Edmund G. Ross

Member of the U.S. House of Representatives from Louisiana's 2nd district
- In office March 4, 1869 – March 3, 1875
- Preceded by: James Mann
- Succeeded by: Ezekiel John Ellis

Personal details
- Born: August 30, 1828 Worcester, New York, U.S.
- Died: January 17, 1917 (aged 88) Pasadena, California, U.S.
- Resting place: Mountain View Cemetery and Mausoleum, Altadena, California, U.S.
- Party: Republican
- Spouse: Mary Greene Miles

Military service
- Allegiance: United States; Union
- Branch/service: Union Army
- Years of service: 1861–1864
- Rank: Colonel; Bvt. Brigadier General
- Commands: 42nd Ohio Infantry Regiment
- Battles/wars: American Civil War (Arkansas Post)

Lionel Allen Sheldon (August 30, 1828 – January 17, 1917) was appointed a brigadier general in the Ohio militia in 1858 by Governor Salmon P Chase and served as an officer in the Union Army during the American Civil War. A U.S. Representative from Louisiana. He was appointed the governor of New Mexico Territory by President James Garfield and served in that role from 1881 until he resigned in 1885.

== Early life ==
Sheldon was born in Worcester, New York, to Allen and Anna Marie (Des Les Dernier) Sheldon. Sheldon moved with his parents to Lagrange, Ohio. He attended the district school and Oberlin College in Oberlin, Ohio from 1848 to 1850 and graduated from the Fowler's State and National Law School, Poughkeepsie, New York, in 1853. He was admitted to the bar the same year and commenced practice in Elyria, Ohio. He was probate judge of Lorain County, Ohio, in 1856 and 1857.

== Military service ==
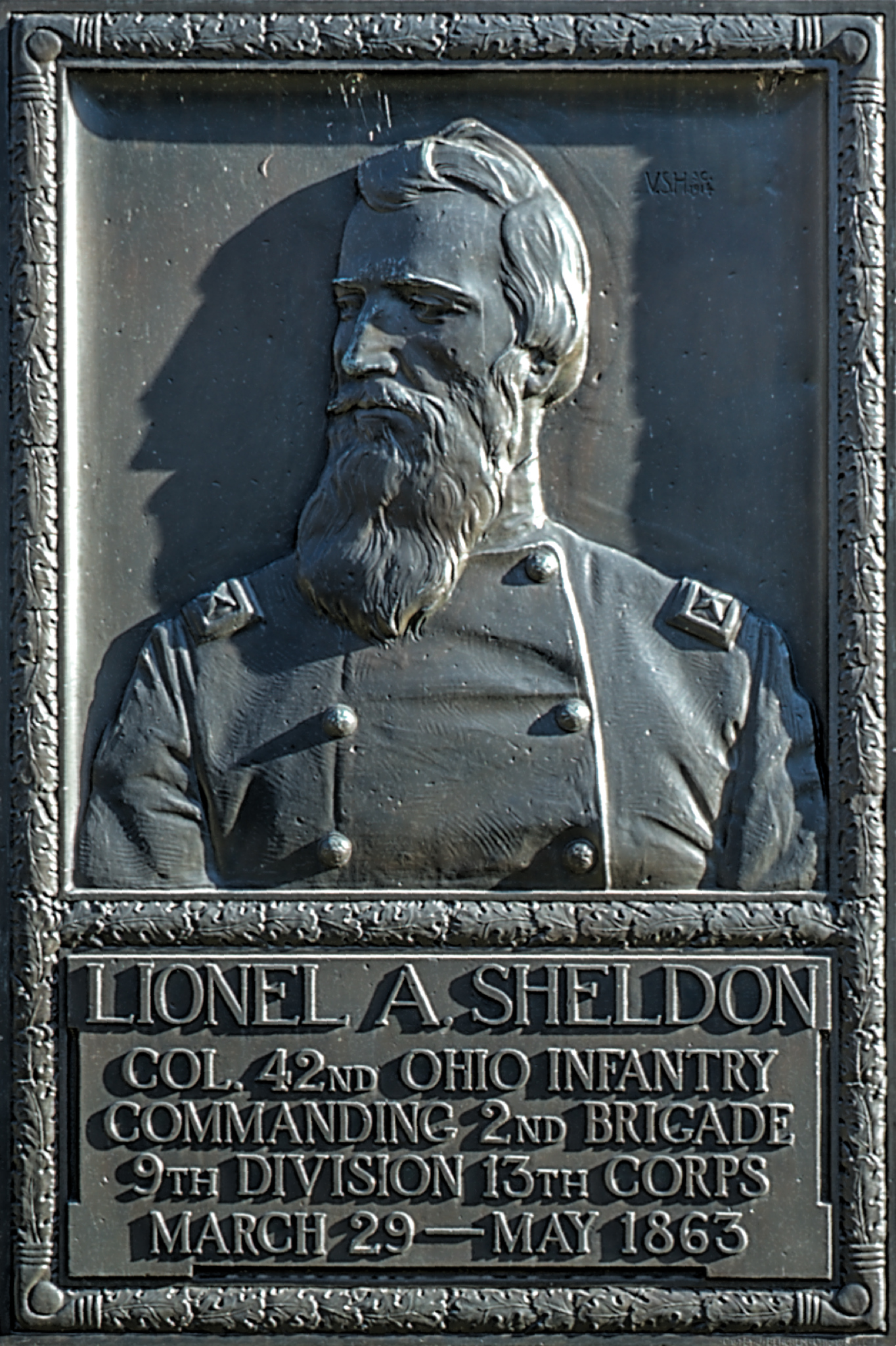
Relief portrait of Sheldon at Vicksburg National Military Park

Sheldon served in the Union Army during the Civil War. He was mustered in as lieutenant colonel of the 42nd Ohio Volunteer Infantry Regiment on November 27, 1861, after raising five companies in six days. Prior to his service with the 42nd Ohio Volunteer Infantry Regiment he served as a cavalry officer with the 2nd Ohio and was commissioned a Brigadier General of the militia by Governor Salmon P Chase in 1858. Sheldon was promoted to the rank of colonel on March 14, 1862, becoming the regiment's second commander following personal friend and future President James Garfield. Sheldon fought in the battles of Middle Creek, Chickaway Bayou, the capture of Cumberland Gap and his brigade launched the attack on Arkansas Post. Under Major General Ulysses S. Grant he participated in the attack on Port Gibson, Mississippi, and saw action during the assault on Thompson’s Hill. Wounded in the hand by a musket ball, Colonel Sheldon stayed at his post, leading two gallant charges on the enemy position. During the engagements at Raymond, Jackson, and Black River Bridge, Colonel Sheldon followed his regiment in an ambulance but recuperated in time to participate in the siege of Vicksburg.

Sheldon was brevetted Brigadier General of volunteers on March 13, 1865. He settled in New Orleans, Louisiana, and practiced law from 1864 to 1879 before being appointed Territorial Governor.

== New Mexico Territory Governor ==
Sheldon assumed the office of the territorial governor on May 15, 1881. When Sheldon assumed office he was met with a great deal of resistance from older citizens and officials. Despite this, Sheldon was successful in starting the construction of The Penitentiary of New Mexico. Governor Sheldon gave much attention to organizing and strengthening the militia as protection not only against lawlessness but against the aggressive native tribes in the region. The remainder of Sheldon's term covered a period of speculation and growing business. Sheldon resigned in 1885.

== Personal ==
On December 29, 1868 Sheldon married Mary Greene Miles, daughter of Thompson and Mary (Greene) Miles of Elyria, Ohio.

== Political career ==
Sheldon was elected as a Republican to the Forty-first, Forty-second, and Forty-third Congresses (March 4, 1869 – March 3, 1875). He served as chairman of the Committee on Militia (Forty-second Congress). He was an unsuccessful candidate for reelection in 1874 to the Forty-fourth Congress. He returned to Ohio in 1879 and participated in the presidential campaign of James Garfield.

Once Garfield became president he appointed Sheldon Governor of the New Mexico Territory, a role he served from 1881 to 1885. He was one of the receivers of the Texas and Pacific Railway from 1885 to 1887. He served as delegate to the Republican National Convention in 1856, 1880, and 1896, each time from a different state, Ohio, Louisiana and California.

== Late life ==
In 1888 Sheldon and his wife moved to Los Angeles, California, where he practiced law. He moved to Pasadena, California, and died in that city on January 17, 1917.

U.S. House of Representatives
Preceded by James Mann	Member of the U.S. House of Representatives from Louisiana's 2nd congressional district March 4, 1869 – March 3, 1875	Succeeded by Ezekiel J. Ellis
