= Battle of Arkansas Post order of battle: Confederate =

The following Confederate Army units and commanders fought in the Battle of Arkansas Post (otherwise known as Battle of Fort Hindman) of the American Civil War. The Union order of battle is listed separately.

== Abbreviations used ==
=== Military rank ===
- BG = Brigadier General
- Col = Colonel
- Ltc = Lieutenant Colonel
- Maj = Major
- Cpt = Captain

== Fort Hindman ==
BG Thomas J. Churchill

Confederate order of battle at Fort Hindman
Brigade	Regiments and Others
First Brigade Col Robert R. Garland	6th Texas: Ltc Thomas S. Anderson; 24th Texas Cavalry (dismounted): Col Franklin C. Wilkes; 25th Texas Cavalry (dismounted): Col Clayton C. Gillespie; Hart's Arkansas Battery: Cpt William Hart; Louisiana Cavalry Company: Cpt William B. Denson
Second Brigade Col James Deshler	10th Texas: Col Roger Q. Mills; 15th Texas Cavalry (dismounted): Maj Valerius P. Sanders; 17th Texas Cavalry (dismounted): Col James R. Taylor; 18th Texas Cavalry (dismounted): Ltc John T. Colt
Third Brigade Col John W. Dunnington	19th Arkansas: Ltc Augustus S. Hutchinson
Unbrigaded	24th Arkansas (detachment): Col Edward E. Portlock, Jr.; Louisiana Cavalry Company: Cpt Leroy M. Nutt; Texas Cavalry Company: Cpt Alfred Johnson; Texas Cavalry Company: Cpt Samuel J. Richardson

== See also ==
- List of Arkansas Civil War Confederate units
- Lists of American Civil War Regiments by State
- Confederate Units by State
- Arkansas in the American Civil War
- Arkansas Militia in the Civil War
