= 42nd Ohio Infantry Regiment =

- Active: September 1861 to December 2, 1864
- Country: United States
- Allegiance: Union
- Branch: Union Army
- Type: Infantry
- Engagements: Battle of Middle Creek; Battle of Tazewell; Battle of Chickasaw Bayou; Battle of Arkansas Post; Battle of Port Gibson; Battle of Champion Hill; Battle of Big Black River Bridge; Siege of Vicksburg; Siege of Jackson; Red River Campaign

The 42nd Ohio Infantry Regiment was an infantry regiment in the Union Army during the American Civil War.

== Service ==
The 42nd Ohio Infantry Regiment was organized at Camp Chase in Columbus, Ohio September through November 1861 and mustered in for three years service on December 7, 1861, under the command of Colonel James Abram Garfield.

The regiment was attached to 18th Brigade, Army of the Ohio, to March 1862. 26th Brigade, 7th Division, Army of the Ohio, to October 1862. 4th Brigade, Cumberland Division, District of West Virginia, Department of the Ohio, to November 1862. 3rd Brigade, 9th Division, Right Wing, XIII Corps, Department of the Tennessee, to December 1862. 3rd Brigade, 3rd Division, Sherman's Yazoo Expedition, to January 1863. 3rd Brigade, 9th Division, XIII Corps, Army of the Tennessee, to February 1863. 2nd Brigade, 9th Division, XIII Corps, to July 1863. 4th Brigade, 1st Division, XIII Corps, Department of the Tennessee, to August 1863, and Department of the Gulf to September 1863. 3rd Brigade, 1st Division, XIII Corps, Department of the Gulf, to November 1863. Plaquemine, District of Baton Rouge, Louisiana, Department of the Gulf, to March 1864. 2nd Brigade, 1st Division, XIII Corps, Department of the Gulf, to June 1864. 1st Brigade, 3rd Division, XIX Corps, to December 1864.

Companies A, B, C, and D mustered out September 30, 1864; companies E and F mustered out November 25, 1864; companies G, H, I, and K mustered out December 2, 1864 (all at Camp Chase). Veterans and recruits were transferred to the 96th Ohio Infantry.

== Detailed service ==
Moved to Catlettsburg, Ky., December 14, 1861; then to Louisa, Ky. Garfield's Campaign against Humphrey Marshall December 23, 1861, to January 30, 1862. Advance on Paintsville, Ky., December 31, 1861, to January 7, 1862. Jennies Creek January 7. Occupation of Paintsville January 8. Middle Creek, near Prestonburg, January 10. Occupation of Prestonburg January 11. Expedition to Pound Gap, Cumberland Mountains, March 14–17, Pound Gap March 16. Cumberland Gap Campaign March 28-June 18. Cumberland Mountain April 28. Occupation of Cumberland Gap June 18 to September 16. Tazewell July 26. Operations about Cumberland Gap August 2–6. Big Springs August 3. Tazewell August 6. Evacuation of Cumberland Gap and retreat to the Ohio River September 17-October 3. Expedition to Charleston October 21-November 10. Ordered to Memphis, Tenn., November 10, and duty there until December 20. Sherman's Yazoo Expedition December 20, 1862, to January 3, 1863. Chickasaw Bayou December 26–28. Chickasaw Bluff December 29. Expedition to Arkansas Post, Ark., January 3–10, 1863. Assault and capture of Fort Hindman, Arkansas Post, January 10–11. Moved to Young's Point, La., January 17. Duty there and at Milliken's Bend, La., until April 25. Operations from Milliken's Bend to New Carthage March 31-April 17. Movement on Bruinsburg, Mississippi and turning Grand Gulf April 25–30. Battle of Port Gibson May 1. Skirmish near Edwards Station May 15. Battle of Champion Hill May 16. Big Black River May 17. Siege of Vicksburg, Miss., May 18-July 4. Assaults on Vicksburg May 19 and 22. Advance on Jackson, Miss., July 5–10. Near Clinton July 8. Siege of Jackson July 10–17, Moved to New Orleans, La., August 13. Duty at Carrollton, Berwick, and Brashear City until October. Western Louisiana Campaign October 3-November 20. Duty at Plaquemine November 21, 1863, to March 24, 1864. Provost duty at Baton Rouge until May 1. Expedition to Clinton May 1–3. Comite River May 1. Moved to Simsport May 18, thence to Morganza and duty there until September 6. Expeditions up White River July 15 and September 6–15. Moved to Duvall's Bluff, Ark., September 15, and duty there until November.

== Casualties ==
The regiment lost a total of 240 men during service; 1 officer and 58 enlisted men killed or mortally wounded, 3 officers and 178 enlisted men died of disease.

== Commanders ==
- Colonel James Abram Garfield
- Colonel Lionel Allen Sheldon
- Lieutenant Colonel Don Albert Pardee - commanded during the siege of Vicksburg
- Major Frederick A. Williams - commanded at the Battle of Champion Hill

== Notable members ==
- Colonel James A. Garfield - 20th President of the United States, 1881
- Colonel Lionel Allen Sheldon - U.S. Representative from Louisiana (1869–1875) and Governor of New Mexico Territory, 1881–1885.

Don Pardee - Commanded the 42 OVI in the assault on Vicksburg. Appointed by President Garfield a United States federal judge, United States circuit court for the Fifth Circuit (1881-1917)

Orlando C. Risdon - 1LT in the 42 OVI was promoted to LTC of United States Colored Troops in 1863. Promoted Colonel and Commander of 53d Regiment USCT 1864. Promoted Brigadier General (Brevet) March 13, 1865. <Whitelaw Reid, 'Ohio in the War' p. 982>

== See also ==
- List of Ohio Civil War units
- Ohio in the Civil War
