= Battle of Cherokee Station =

Battle of the American Civil War

- Part of American Civil War
| Date | 21 October 1863 |
| Location | Near Cherokee Station, nine miles from Tuscumbia, Alabama 34°45′32.7″N 87°58′40.3″W |
| Result | Union victory |

Belligerents
| United States | (Confederate States of America) Confederate States |

Commanders and leaders
| (United States) Francis Preston Blair Jr: (United States) Peter J. Osterhaus; (United States) Morgan Lewis Smith | (Confederate States of America) S.D. Lee |

Units involved
| XV Corps | Unknown |

Strength
| 10,000 – 15,000 men "Several" 20-pound Parrott rifles | 4,000 – 6,000 men |

Casualties and losses
| 7 dead, 28 wounded | 300 dead, wounded, or captured |

The Battle of Cherokee Station took place during the American Civil War between the Union Army and the Confederate Army near the town of Cherokee Station Alabama on 21 October 1863.

General Sherman attempted to start rebuilding the Memphis and Charleston Railroad to give Union forces an easier time to arrive at Chattanooga from Mississippi. Sherman initiated his reconstruction at Corinth, Mississippi and began to push into northern Alabama.

On 20 October, the Union captured Barton's Station and began their assault on Cherokee Station with a brief cavalry skirmish. XV Corps attacked Confederate forces near Cherokee Station and after an hour of trading musket fire, the Confederates retreated. First Division of XV Corps brought up several Parrott rifles and killed many of the retreating Confederates.

The Union continued its push with a decisive victory at Little Bear Creek on October 27 near Tuscumbia, forcing the Confederates to surrender Tuscumbia. The continued Confederate resistance, however, persuaded the Union to instead seek more northerly, safer routes to Chattanooga.

== Background ==
General Sherman attempted to rebuild the Memphis and Charleston Railroad in order to make it easier for Union forces to get to Chattanooga and Missionary Ridge to prepare for an attack on Atlanta, Georgia. They began rebuilding near Corinth, Mississippi and pushed through Northwest Alabama.

Sherman began his push near Cane Creek on 20 October, winning a battle against the Confederates. On the same day, skirmishes occurred at Barton's and Dickson's Stations, both Union victories. Later on 20 October, Sherman pushed east towards Cherokee Station.

On the evening of 20 October, a skirmish occurred between the 5th Ohio Cavalry and a large troop of Confederate cavalry. The 3rd U.S. Cavalry came up as support, but the 5th Cavalry finished off the Confederates on their own. The 5th lost a total of three men and two horses.

== Battle ==
On 21 October at 08:00, the XV Corps moved up towards the location of the Confederate troops, with its 1st Division leading. They encountered a large force of Confederate soldiers and opened fire. Musket fire was exchanged for an hour, with the Confederates sustaining heavy losses. After the loss of a significant number of their men, the Confederates retreated. The division brought up several 20-pound Parrott rifles and inflicted several dozen more casualties. Several Confederate soldiers were captured as well.

== Aftermath ==
The Confederates retreated from the field back to fortifications near Tuscumbia. Union forces sustained 35 casualties, while the Confederates suffered 300–400 casualties.

Lieutenant-General Stephen Dill Lee used artillery and his men to delay the Union's assault on Tuscumbia and made occasional skirmishes with Union troops, such as the skirmish at Barton's Station. However, on 27 October, Lee was forced to retreat from Tuscumbia after a defeat at Little Bear Creek. As Union troops went towards Georgia, Lee attempted a second assault on Cherokee Station, but was repulsed by XV Corps. After this defeat, the Confederates attempted to win at another skirmish at Barton's Station. Due to the lack of supplies, Lee was forced to withdraw from Alabama to northern Georgia. However, Lee's resistance prevented the reconstruction of the Memphis and Charleston Railroad by making the Union use northern detours to Chattanooga. Bragg commended Lee for his actions in delaying Union forces and preventing the construction of the Memphis and Charleston Railroad.
