= XV Corps (Union army) =

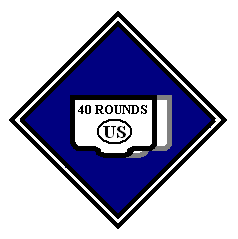
- XV Corps badge
- Active: 1862–1865
- Country: United States of America
- Branch: Union Army
- Type: Infantry
- Role: Headquarters
- Size: Corps
- Part of: Army of the Tennessee; Military Division of the Mississippi
- Motto: 40 Rounds
- Engagements: American Civil War

Commanders
- Notable commanders: Ulysses S. Grant; William T. Sherman; John A. Logan; Peter Osterhaus; William B. Hazen

Insignia
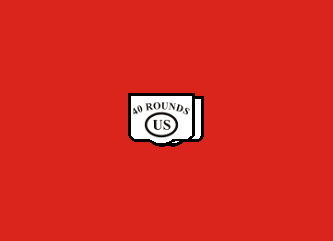
- 1st Division

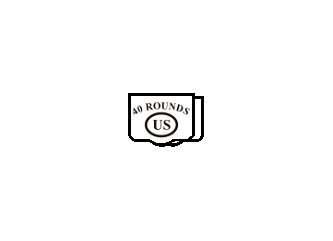
- 2nd Division

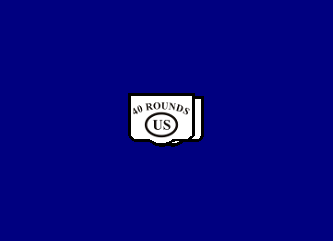
- 3rd Division

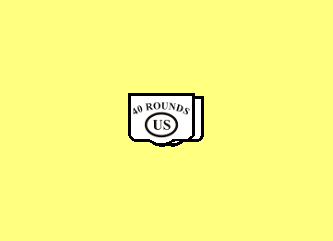
- 4th Division

The XV Army Corps was a corps of the Union Army during the American Civil War. It served in the Army of the Tennessee under Maj. Gens. Ulysses S. Grant and William T. Sherman. It was commanded by Sherman in the siege of Vicksburg and then by Maj. Gen. John A. Logan in Sherman's Atlanta campaign. Brig. Gen. Peter J. Osterhaus commanded the corps in the March to the Sea, but Logan was back in command during Sherman's Carolina Campaign. When General Howard became head of the Freedman's Bureau, Logan became the commander of the Army of the Tennessee for the final march to Washington. William Hazen became the XV Corps final commander.

The XV Corps' badge was a shield with a cartridge box in the middle with the Corps motto "40 Rounds." The badge and motto originated from the Western XV Corps' rivalry with the eastern XII Corps. When the Western and Eastern soldiers finally met up near Chattanooga in late 1863, the XI and XII Corps soldiers bragged about their crescent and star-shaped corps badges. When asked what badge the XV Corps had (The XV Corps did not have one yet at the time), an Irish soldier of the XV Corps said, "Moon and stars is it? Sure it was the light of both ye needed to find your way home from Chancellorsville!" (The XI Corps had been routed at that battle) whereupon he slapped his cartridge box and said, "Corps badge? This is the badge of the Fifteenth Corps; 40 rounds!" This saying eventually reached the ears of General Logan. He soon sent out the following circular to his men:

'The following is announced as the badge of this corps: A miniature cartridge box, black, set transversely on a field of cloth or metal: above the cartridge box plate will be stamped or marked in a curve, the motto "Forty Rounds".'

An alternate retelling of the tale behind the unique corps-badge, as given by Sherman in his Memoirs:

'It was on this occasion that the Fifteenth Corps gained its peculiar badge: as the men were trudging along the deeply-cut, muddy road, of a cold, drizzly day, one of our Western soldiers left his ranks and joined a party of the Twelfth Corps at their camp-fire. They got into conversation, the Twelfth-Corps men asking what troops we were, etc., etc. In turn, our fellow (who had never seen a corps-badge, and noticed that every thing was marked with a star) asked if they were all brigadier-generals. Of course they were not, but the star was their corps-badge, and every wagon, tent, hat, etc., had its star. Then the Twelfth-Corps men inquired what corps be belonged to, and he answered, "The Fifteenth Corps." "What is your badge?" "Why," said he (and he was an Irishman), suiting the action to the word, "forty rounds in the cartridge-box, and twenty in the pocket!" At that time Blair commanded the corps; but Logan succeeded soon after, and, hearing the story, adopted the cartridge-box and forty rounds as the corps-badge.'

The Fifteenth Corps is highlighted near the end of Chapter III of MacKinlay Kantor's Pulitzer Prize-winning novel "Andersonville" (1955).

== See also ==
- Army of the Tennessee
