= Battle of Grand Gulf =

1863 battle of the American Civil War

- Part of the Vicksburg campaign
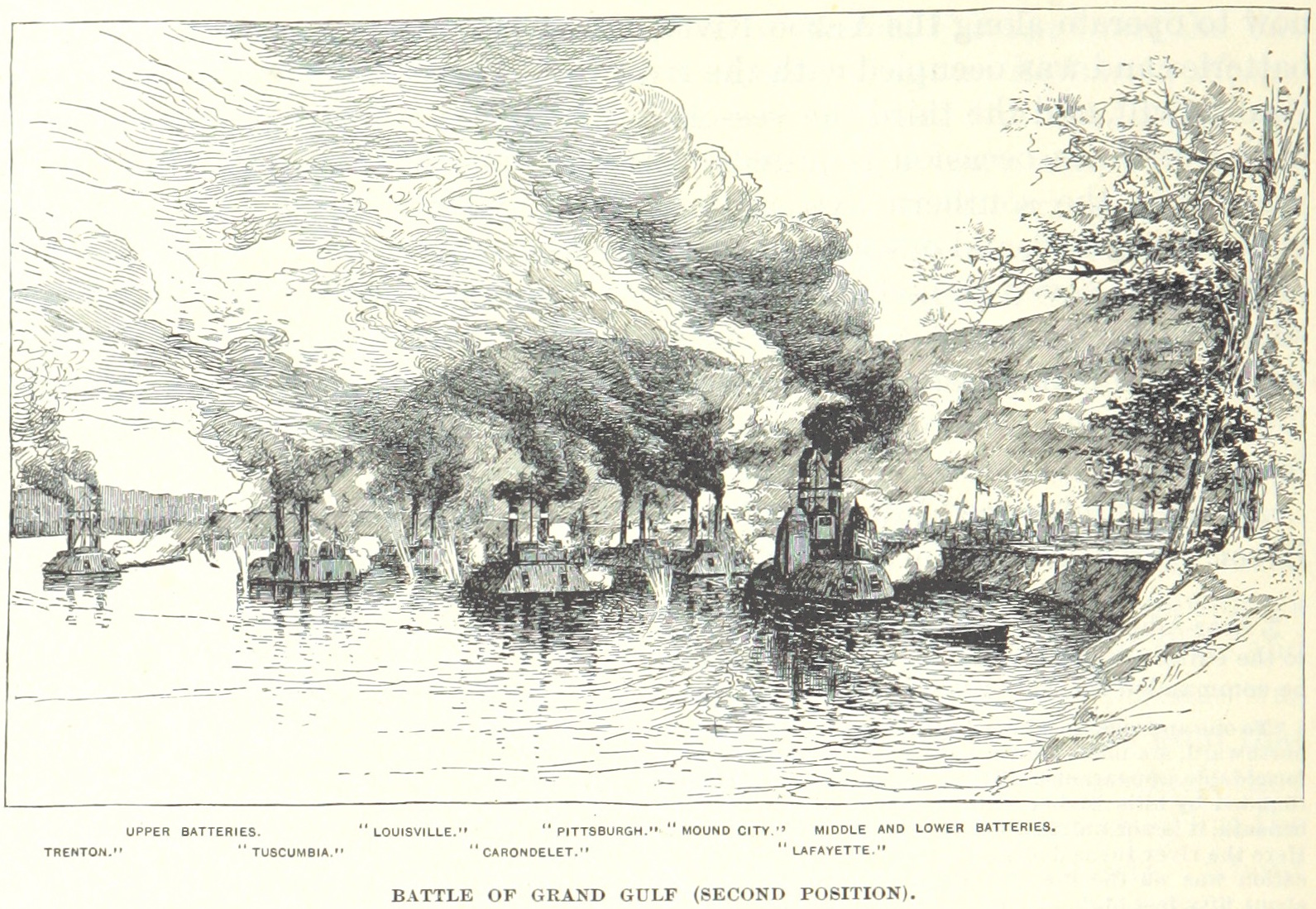
- 1887 illustration of Union ships bombarding the Confederate positions at Grand Gulf
Date	April 29, 1863
Location	Grand Gulf, Mississippi 32°01′45″N 91°03′22″W
Result	Confederate victory

Belligerents
United States (Union)	(Confederate States of America) CSA (Confederacy)

Commanders and leaders
David D. Porter	John S. Bowen

Units involved
Mississippi Squadron	Bowen's division

Strength
7 ironclad warships c. 10,000 men on transport vessels	4,200

Casualties and losses
75–80	18–22

The Battle of Grand Gulf was fought on April 29, 1863, during the American Civil War. Union Army forces commanded by Major General Ulysses S. Grant had failed several times to bypass or capture the Confederate-held city of Vicksburg, Mississippi, during the Vicksburg campaign. Grant decided to move his army south of Vicksburg, cross the Mississippi River, and then advance on the city. A Confederate Army division under Brigadier General John S. Bowen prepared defenses—Forts Wade and Cobun—at Grand Gulf, Mississippi, south of Vicksburg. To clear the way for a Union crossing, seven Union Navy ironclad warships from the Mississippi Squadron commanded by Admiral David Dixon Porter bombarded the Confederate defenses at Grand Gulf on April 29. Union fire silenced Fort Wade and killed its commander, but the overall Confederate position held. Grant decided to cross the river elsewhere.

The next day, Union forces crossed the river at Bruinsburg, Mississippi. A Union victory in the Battle of Port Gibson on May 1 secured the beachhead and forced the abandonment of the position at Grand Gulf, which became a Union supply point. Grant's command moved inland, and after defeating Confederate forces in the Battle of Champion Hill on May 16, began the Siege of Vicksburg two days later. Vicksburg surrendered on July 4, marking a major Confederate defeat and a turning point in the war. The Grand Gulf battlefield is preserved in Grand Gulf Military State Park, which was listed on the National Register of Historic Places in 1972.

== Background ==
Early in the American Civil War, the Union military leadership developed the Anaconda Plan, which was a strategy to defeat the Confederate States of America. A significant component of this strategy was controlling the Mississippi River, thus isolating the western Confederacy from the remainder. Much of the Mississippi Valley fell under Union control in early 1862 after the capture of New Orleans, Louisiana, and several land victories. The strategically important city of Vicksburg, Mississippi was still in Confederate hands, serving as a strong defensive position that commanded the river and prevented the Union from separating the two parts of the Confederacy. Union Navy elements were sent upriver from New Orleans in May to try to take the city, a move that was unsuccessful. In late June, a joint army-navy expedition returned to make another campaign against Vicksburg. Union Navy leadership decided that the city could not be taken without more infantrymen, who were not forthcoming. An attempt to cut Williams's Canal across a meander of the river in June and July, bypassing Vicksburg, failed.

In late November, about 40,000 Union infantry commanded by Major General Ulysses S. Grant began moving south towards Vicksburg from a starting point in Tennessee. Grant ordered a retreat after a supply depot and part of his supply line were destroyed during the Holly Springs Raid on December 20 and Forrest's West Tennessee Raid. Meanwhile, another arm of the expedition under the command of Major General William T. Sherman left Memphis, Tennessee, on the same day as the Holly Springs Raid and traveled down the Mississippi River. After diverting up the Yazoo River, Sherman's men began skirmishing with Confederate soldiers defending a line of hills above the Chickasaw Bayou. A Union attack on December 29 was defeated decisively at the Battle of Chickasaw Bayou, and Sherman's men withdrew on January 1, 1863.

By late March, further attempts to bypass Vicksburg had failed. Grant then considered three plans: to withdraw to Memphis and retry the overland route through northern Mississippi; to move south along the west side of the Mississippi River, cross below Vicksburg, and then strike for the city; or to make an amphibious assault across the river directly against Vicksburg. An assault across the river risked heavy casualties, and a withdrawal to Memphis could be politically disastrous if the public perceived such a movement as a retreat. Grant then decided upon the downstream crossing. The advance along the west bank of the Mississippi began on March 29, and was spearheaded by Major General John A. McClernand's troops. The movement down the river was masked by decoy operations such as Steele's Greenville expedition, Streight's Raid, and Grierson's Raid. Confederate regional commander John C. Pemberton fell for the Union decoys (especially Grierson's Raid), and lost touch with the true tactical situation, believing Grant was withdrawing.

== Prelude ==
Grant's Operations against Vicksburg. Confederate (dashed lines) Union (solid lines)

On multiple occasions in mid-1862, Confederate field artillery harassed Union Navy vessels from Grand Gulf, Mississippi, which was located along the Mississippi River to the south of Vicksburg. The town was largely burned by Union troops attempting to suppress the Confederate guns. In early March 1863, the Confederates decided to rebuild fortifications at Grand Gulf, and the brigade of Brigadier General John S. Bowen was transferred there. By the middle of the month, Bowen's troops and several slaves were working on building new defenses and strengthening the existing ones. Heavy cannons were transferred to the position, but before those guns could arrive, a skirmish occurred on March 19, between the Confederate defenders and two Union Navy ships: the sloop-of-war USS Hartford and the schooner USS Albatross. The exchange was not protracted and the Confederates suffered no loss; the Union had eight men killed or wounded on Hartford. Soon afterwards, five heavy guns arrived at Grand Gulf: two 8-inch (203 mm) pieces and three 32-pounder rifled cannons.

In early April, Bowen became aware of Grant's movement down the west side of the Mississippi River, and sent part of his force under the command of Francis Cockrell across the river on April 4, to counter the Union movement. Bowen informed Pemberton of Grant's advance, but the latter officer disregarded the information. The Union Navy forces cooperating with Grant, which were commanded by David Dixon Porter and known as the Mississippi Squadron, were positioned north of Vicksburg, but there was a need for vessels to move south for operations near Port Hudson, Louisiana, as well as to provide a stronger protecting force for the transports that would ferry troops in Grant's planned crossing of the Mississippi River. Beginning two hours after nightfall on April 16, Porter ran several vessels past the batteries at Vicksburg, with the loss of only a transport and a barge. Pemberton learned of the passing of the batteries, and began to develop a clearer picture of the true strategic situation. Grand Gulf was reinforced by Brigadier General Martin E. Green's brigade; when this unit arrived Pemberton elevated the concentration at Grand Gulf to divisional status with Bowen in command. With the addition of a miscellaneous command of 800 men and a four-gun battery sent from Jackson, Mississippi, there were about 4,200 Confederate troops around Grand Gulf.

After dark on April 22, more transports were run down the river past Vicksburg: one transport and several barges were lost, and all of the surviving transports were damaged. Porter had been prepared to bombard Grand Gulf on April 23, with McClernand providing an infantry force to land there afterwards, but believing a false report of the Confederates having 12,000 men at Grand Gulf, called off the attack. McClernand observed Grand Gulf later that day, as did Grant the next day. Both determined the Confederate position was not as strong as had been reported. Union forces moved further downriver, and opened a base of operations at Hard Times Landing. By April 28, most of McClernand's men had been loaded onto transports in preparation for the river crossing. Hoping to further distract the Confederates, Grant suggested another feint: this one to be made by Sherman up the Yazoo River. Grant had some hesitations about such a feint, believing that reports of it might be misconstrued by the Union public as another Chickasaw Bayou-style defeat, but Sherman continued with the operation. Sherman's movement resulted in the Battle of Snyder's Bluff, which saw Union warships and transports loaded with infantry move up the Yazoo River on April 29, and skirmish with Confederate forces during the next two days. Overall, it was not particularly effective as a distraction.

On April 28, Pemberton finally realized the importance of the Union buildup near Grand Gulf. He ordered Carter L. Stevenson to prepare a 5,000-man force to be sent to Grand Gulf at Bowen's discretion, but Stevenson still regarded the Union move south as a feint in preparation for an assault directly against Vicksburg. Bowen lacked a cavalry force for scouting, as the cavalry at Grand Gulf had been sent elsewhere to chase down Grierson's Raid. The work on the defenses at Grand Gulf had resulted in a much stronger position than had been there at the beginning of March. Two forts were the strongpoints of the fortification. The stronger was known as Fort Cobun, and the other as Fort Wade.

Fort Cobun was positioned on a 40-foot (12 m) tall bluff known as Point of Rock and had a parapet that was about 40 feet (12 m) in width. It mounted four cannons – two 32-pounder guns, an 8-inch Dahlgren gun, and a 30-pounder Parrott rifle – which were crewed by Battery A, 1st Louisiana Heavy Artillery. Fort Wade was located 0.75 miles (1 km) downriver, on a point 20 feet (6.1 m) above the level of the river and 0.25 miles (0.4 km) away from it. This fort mounted a 100-pounder Blakely rifle, another 8-inch Dahlgren piece, and two more 32-pounders. These pieces were worked by Wade's Missouri Battery and Guibor's Missouri Battery. In between the two forts were two rows of rifle pits and a covered passageway. The 3rd Missouri Infantry Regiment held this position. A secondary line of rifle pits to the rear on a ridge was defended by five smaller Parrott rifles and the 6th Missouri Infantry Regiment. Two more cannons and the 1st Confederate Battalion were positioned on a bluff to guard the mouth of the Big Black River, with some sharpshooters from Arkansas, Dawson's Missouri Battery, and a dismounted cavalry unit positioned further up the Big Black River. Porter believed the Confederates were too well-prepared for an attack against Grand Gulf to be worthwhile, and instead suggested that the army march further south, accompanied by the navy's ironclad warships to cover the movement of its transports. Grant had the area north of Grand Gulf assessed for suitable crossing points, but none could be found. Grant believed that the position would not be difficult to take, so the assault against Grand Gulf would occur as planned.

== Battle ==
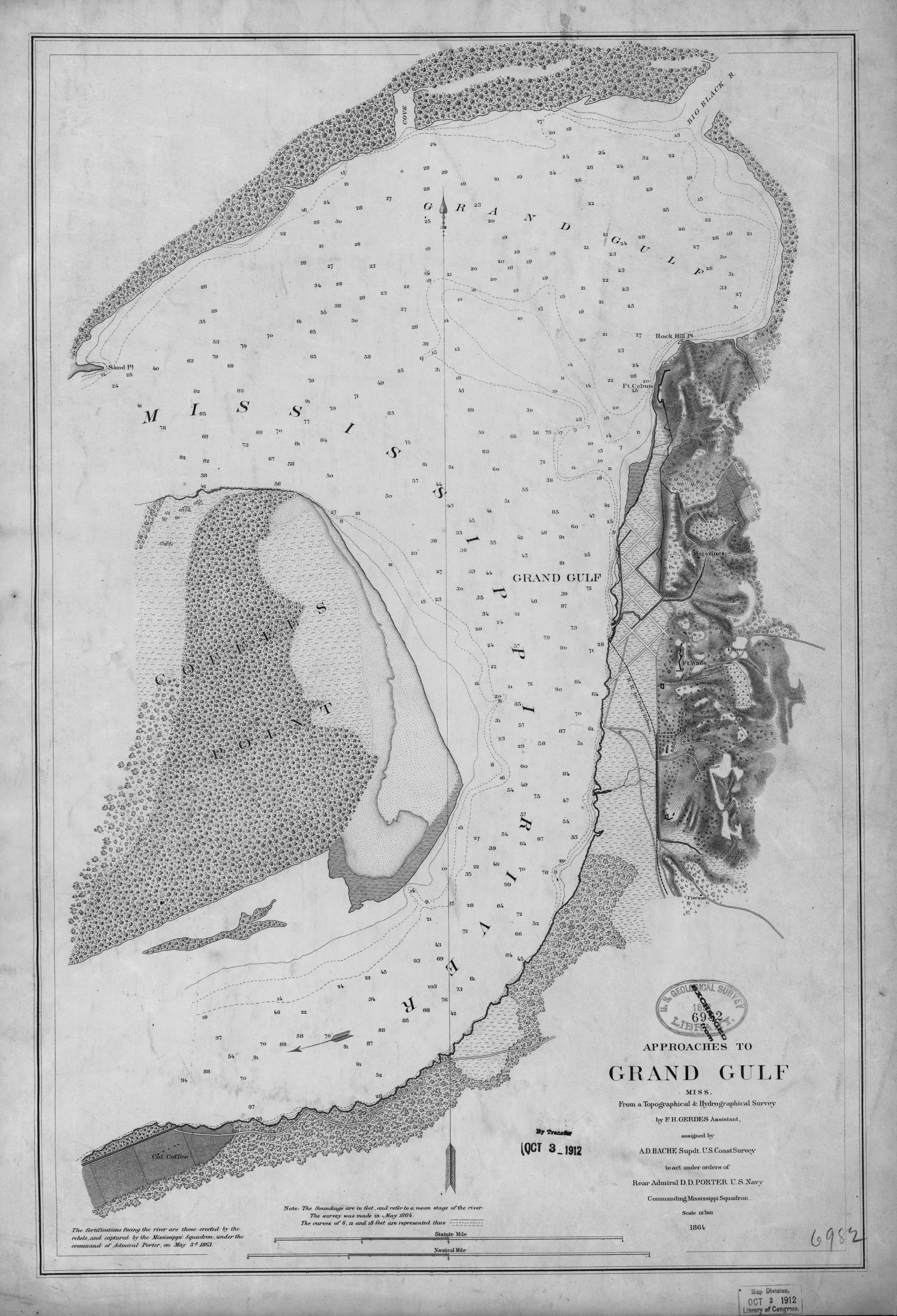
1864 map of the approaches to Grand Gulf

At 7:00 a.m. on April 29, seven Union Navy ironclads led by Porter moved down the river from Hard Times Landing towards the positions at Grand Gulf. Roughly 30,000 Union infantry were in the Hard Times Landing area, of whom about 10,000 were on transports. The men on the transports, which had pulled away from the landing and were sheltered behind a spit of land named Point Coffee, were intended to cross the river and occupy Grand Gulf once the Confederate batteries were subdued. Porter instructed his ironclad commanders to take care to avoiding running aground in shallow water. Men from detachments of the 58th Ohio Infantry Regiment and the 29th Illinois Infantry Regiment were stationed on board the ironclads to serve as marines and, if necessary, as a landing force. Of Porter's ironclads, USS Pittsburgh was in the lead, followed by USS Louisville, USS Carondelet, and USS Mound City. A second wave composed of USS Benton, USS Tuscumbia, and USS Lafayette followed. A total of 81 cannons were carried by these vessels, compared to 13 in the Confederate positions. The naval forces also had the advantage in size of artillery: the majority of the Confederate guns were 30-pounders or smaller, as opposed to the median Union piece being a 42-pounder. The ironclads first targeted Fort Cobun, then Pittsburgh, Louisville, Carondelet, and Mound City moved to focus on Fort Wade; the other three remained focused on Fort Cobun. After passing Fort Cobun, the ships turned so that their bows pointed upstream. The lead Union vessels opened fire at about 7:50 a.m., and Fort Cobun responded about 25 minutes later. Currents in the river caught some of the Union vessels, forcing them to spin in circles while the Confederate fired upon them. After the shooting started, the 12th Arkansas Sharpshooter Battalion was moved forward from a reserve position into rifle pits near Fort Cobun.

Although Pittsburgh, Louisville, Carondelet, and Mound City each carried 13 guns, the positioning of the guns on the ships allowed a maximum of four guns at a time to be aimed at the Confederate fortifications, reducing the Union firepower. By 10:00 a.m., Fort Wade was knocked out of action. One of the large cannons in Fort Wade had exploded, the fortifications themselves had been severely damaged, and Colonel William F. Wade, commanding the post, had been decapitated by Union fire. The surviving cannons at Fort Wade had been buried under earth from the damaged fortifications. The four Union vessels that had silenced Fort Wade moved upriver to face the remaining Confederate fort, which fought on. A Confederate shot struck Benton, destroying the ship's wheel. Confederate troops in the rifle pits also fired into the Union vessels. Around 1:00 p.m., Fort Cobun decreased its fire due to ammunition shortages. However, Porter and Grant decided not to attempt an amphibious landing against Grand Gulf due to the strength of the Confederate position. Despite the damage and the ammunition shortage, the Confederate batteries were still capable of repulsing a landing from the transports. During the action, Porter had been struck in the back of his head with a shell fragment; the painful wound caused him to use his sword as a cane. The naval vessels had fired more than 2,300 shots during the bombardment.

Confederate fire had focused the heaviest on Benton, Pittsburgh, and Tuscumbia. The former vessel had taken 47 hits, Pittsburgh 35, and the latter over 80. Tuscumbia was poorly built (for instance, the spikes holding the ship's iron plating on were not secured with nuts), and had been badly damaged and knocked out of the fighting by engine damage. Historians Michael B. Ballard and Ed Bearss state that the Union forces lost 18 men killed and 57 wounded, for a total of 75, with historians William L. Shea and Terrence J. Winschel, along with the historian Timothy B. Smith instead placing Union casualties at 24 killed and 56 wounded, including a few men from the army serving on the warships in a volunteer capacity. According to Ballard and Bearss, Confederate losses totaled 22: three dead and 19 wounded; historian Donald L. Miller and Shea and Winschel state that the Confederates lost 18 men, the difference being in wounded.

== Aftermath ==
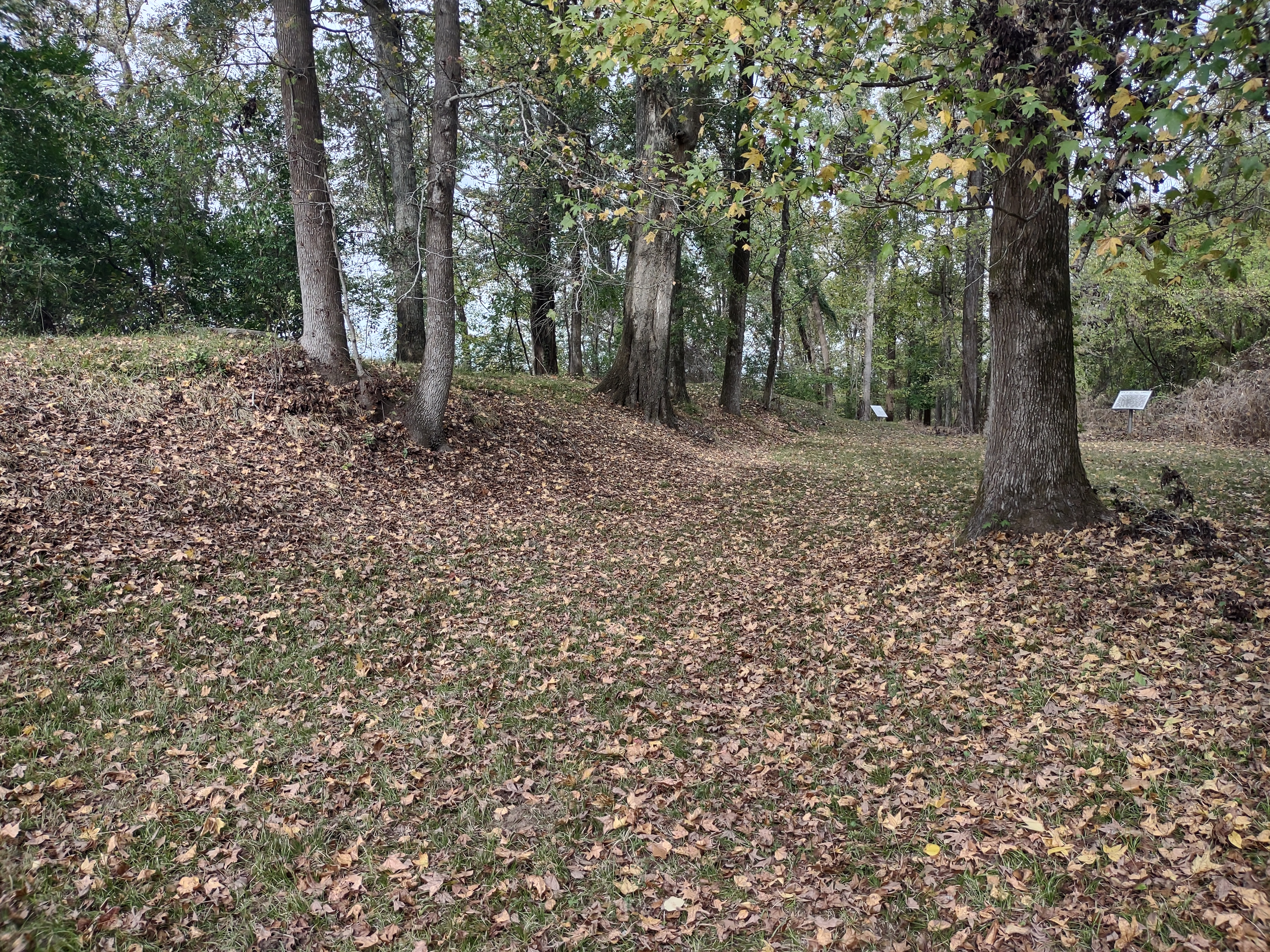
A 2023 photograph of the remains of Fort Cobun at Grand Gulf Military State Park

After the naval bombardment was unable to neutralize the Confederate position at Grand Gulf, the troops on the transports returned to dry land. Later that day, the Union transports and barges were run downriver, under the covering fire of Porter's gunboats. (Note: Sources disagree as to the timing of this run. Ballard writes that it was timed to "[take] advantage of the later afternoon sun to blind Confederate gunners". Miller states that the movement occurred in the evening, Bearss times the run downriver as at 7:45 p.m., and Shea and Winschel state that it occurred in the "late afternoon". Smith states that the exchange of fire that resulted from the movement occurred at 9:00 p.m.) The vessels were able to make it downriver safely; Porter lost one man in the affair and the Confederates lost none. Some of the Union vessels had been hit, but suffered little damage. Grant's infantrymen marched downriver to Disharoon's plantation, where the transports had been gathered after passing Grand Gulf. Two crossing points below Grand Gulf were considered by Grant: Rodney, Mississippi, or Bruinsburg, Mississippi. Bowen expected Union troops to cross at the former. Discussions between Union scouts and an African American, who was possibly named Bob, yielded the information that a usable road ran from Bruinsburg to Port Gibson, so Bruinsburg was selected as the crossing point.

Late on April 29, expecting a Union crossing of the river, Bowen sent a detachment from his command to hold Port Gibson, and the next day sent reinforcements that had arrived from Vicksburg to that place as well. On the morning of April 30, the Bruinsburg crossing began. McClernand's corps and a portion of Major General James B. McPherson's corps led the way. By the next morning, 24,000 Union soldiers had crossed the river without opposition. No American amphibious military landing exceeded the size of the Bruinsburg crossing until World War II. More of McPherson's men crossed on May 1. Early that morning, the Confederates near Port Gibson encountered McClernand's advancing troops. The ensuing Battle of Port Gibson was a hard-fought Union victory. Winning the battle protected the Union beachhead and rendered Grand Gulf indefensible. Pemberton ordered Bowen to abandon the position, and the Confederates spiked the cannons there early on May 3. Union forces occupied the position after the Confederates withdrew, and it became a supply point during the ongoing campaign. Portions of Sherman's corps crossed the river at Grand Gulf late on May 6 and into May 7.

Grant's men swung inland towards the railroad supplying Vicksburg. After the Battle of Raymond on May 12, Grant decided to swing east to disperse the Confederate reinforcements gathering at Jackson. Jackson was taken on May 14, and two days later, Pemberton's attempt to defeat Grant outside of Vicksburg was defeated in the climactic Battle of Champion Hill. The Siege of Vicksburg began on May 18, and ended in a Confederate surrender on July 4. The capture of Vicksburg divided the Confederacy along the Mississippi River, and with the Union victory at the Siege of Port Hudson, gave the Union control of the river. Together with a Confederate defeat at the Battle of Gettysburg on July 3, the fall of Vicksburg marked a turning point in the war. The war ended in 1865 with a Confederate defeat.

The site of the battle is preserved by Grand Gulf Military State Park. The park contains the land where forts Wade and Cobun were located, as well as an observation tower, a museum, and the remains of the old town of Grand Gulf. The park was listed on the National Register of Historic Places on April 11, 1972.

== Sources ==
- Ballard, Michael B. (2004). Vicksburg: The Campaign that Opened the Mississippi. Chapel Hill, North Carolina: University of North Carolina Press. ISBN 0-8078-2893-9.
- Bearss, Edwin C. (1991) [1986]. The Campaign for Vicksburg. Vol. II: Grant Strikes a Fatal Blow. Dayton, Ohio: Morningside Bookshop. ISBN 0-89029-313-9.
- Bearss, Edwin C. (1998). "Raymond, Mississippi". In Kennedy, Frances H. (ed.). The Civil War Battlefield Guide (2nd ed.). Boston, Massachusetts/New York, New York: Houghton Mifflin. pp. 164–167. ISBN 978-0-395-74012-5.
- Bearss, Edwin C. (1998). "Champion Hill, Mississippi". In Kennedy, Frances H. (ed.). The Civil War Battlefield Guide (2nd ed.). Boston, Massachusetts/New York, New York: Houghton Mifflin. pp. 167–171. ISBN 978-0-395-74012-5.
- Bearss, Edwin C. (1998). "Battle and Siege of Vicksburg, Mississippi". In Kennedy, Frances H. (ed.). The Civil War Battlefield Guide (2nd ed.). Boston, Massachusetts/New York, New York: Houghton Mifflin. pp. 171–173. ISBN 978-0-395-74012-5.
- Bearss, Edwin C. (2007) [2006]. Fields of Honor. Washington, D.C.: National Geographic. ISBN 978-1-4262-0093-9.
- Kennedy, Frances H. (1998). The Civil War Battlefield Guide (2nd ed.). Boston, Massachusetts/New York, New York: Houghton Mifflin. ISBN 978-0-395-74012-5.
- Miller, Donald L. (2019). Vicksburg: Grant's Campaign that Broke the Confederacy. New York, New York: Simon and Schuster. ISBN 978-1-4516-4139-4.
- Shea, William L.; Winschel, Terrence J. (2003). Vicksburg Is the Key: The Struggle for the Mississippi River. Lincoln, Nebraska: University of Nebraska Press. ISBN 978-0-8032-9344-1.
- Silverstone, Paul H. (2006). Civil War Navies, 1855–1883. New York, New York: Routledge. ISBN 978-0-415-97870-5.
- Smith, Timothy B. (2023). Bayou Battles for Vicksburg: The Swamp and River Expeditions, January 1–April 30, 1863. Lawrence, Kansas: University Press of Kansas. ISBN 978-0-7006-3566-5.
- Weeks, Michael (2009). The Complete Civil War Road Trip Guide. Woodstock, Vermont: The Countryman Press. ISBN 978-0-88150-860-4.
- Winschel, Terrence J. (1998). "Chickasaw Bayou, Mississippi". In Kennedy, Frances H. (ed.). The Civil War Battlefield Guide (2nd ed.). Boston, Massachusetts/New York, New York: Houghton Mifflin. pp. 154–156. ISBN 978-0-395-74012-5.
- Wright, William C. (1982). Archaeological Report No. 8: The Confederate Magazine at Fort Wade Grand Gulf, Mississippi, Excavations 1980–1981 (PDF) (Report). Mississippi Department of Archives and History. OCLC 9566064. Archived from the original (PDF) on July 22, 2014.
