= USS Shirk =

Clemson-class destroyer

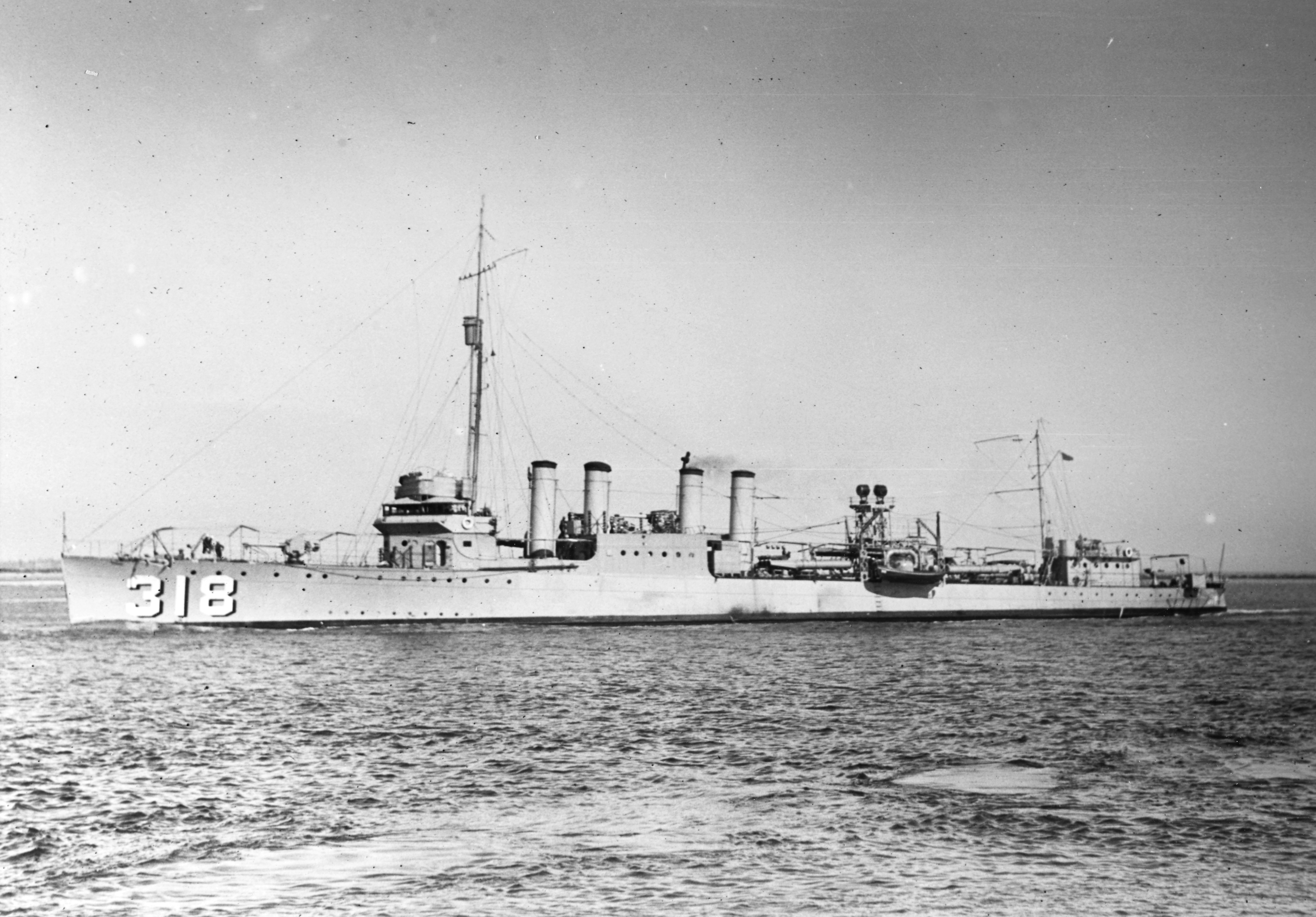

History

United States
- Namesake: James W. Shirk
- Builder: Bethlehem Shipbuilding Corporation, Union Iron Works, San Francisco
- Laid down: 13 February 1919
- Launched: 20 June 1919
- Commissioned: 5 February 1921
- Decommissioned: 8 February 1930
- Stricken: 22 July 1930
- Fate: Sold for scrap, 27 January 1931

General characteristics
- Class & type: Clemson-class destroyer
- Displacement: 1,215 tons
- Length: 314 feet 4 1/2 inches (95.822 m)
- Beam: 30 feet 11 1/2 inches (9.436 m)
- Draft: 9 feet 4 inches (2.84 m)
- Propulsion: 26,500 shp (20 MW); geared turbines, 2 screws
- Speed: 35 knots (65 km/h)
- Range: 4,900 nmi (9,100 km); @ 15 kt
- Complement: 122 officers and enlisted
- Armament: 4 × 4 in (102 mm)/50 guns, 1 × 3 in (76 mm)/25 gun, 12 × 21 inch (533 mm) torpedo tubes

USS Shirk (DD-318) was a Clemson-class destroyer in service with the United States Navy from 1919 to 1930. She was scrapped in 1931.

== Namesake ==
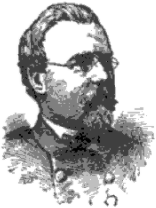
James W. Shirk

James W. Shirk was born on 16 July 1832 in Pennsylvania. He was appointed midshipman on 26 March 1849. He cruised between 1849 and 1860 on the coasts of Africa, East India, and North America, on the gunnery ship, USS Plymouth. He also served in the Great Lakes and with the Pacific Squadron.

During the American Civil War, he won distinction for his service in the Mississippi Squadron at the Battle of Fort Henry on 6 February 1862; and at Pittsburgh Landing on 1 March 1862; and again on 6 and 7 April 1862. During the latter engagement at Pittsburgh Landing, his ship, USS Lexington, in company with USS Tyler, prevented the Confederate forces from crossing the river and saved the Union Army from defeat in the Battle of Shiloh. He later took part in engagements with Confederate batteries at Chickasaw Bayou, St. Charles, White River, Arkansas Post and the passage of the Vicksburg batteries. During the siege of Vicksburg, his ship, USS Tuscumbia, was frequently under fire between 19 May and the Confederate surrender on 4 July 1863.

He commanded the Seventh Division of the Mississippi Squadron in 1863 and 1864. After peace had been restored, he cruised in the European Squadron and performed special duty for the Navy Department from 1866 to 1872. Commander Shirk died in Washington, D.C., on 10 February 1873.

== History ==
Shirk was laid down on 13 February 1919 by the Bethlehem Shipbuilding Corporation, San Francisco, California; launched on 20 June 1919; sponsored by Miss Ida Lawlor Dunnigan; and commissioned on 5 February 1921.

Shirk arrived in her homeport, San Diego, California, on 7 March 1921 and, after three weeks of exercises, was placed in reserve there until October. She conducted exercises off San Diego from late in the year until sailing with the fleet on 27 June 1922 for exercises off Puget Sound. The ship returned to San Diego on 19 September and resumed operations there.

Shirk departed San Diego on 6 February 1923 with the fleet and participated in combined exercises off Panama from 26 February to 31 March. Returning to San Diego on 11 April, she underwent overhaul at Mare Island from 9 July to 1 September and resumed operations at San Diego on 9 September. She sailed again with the fleet on 2 January 1924 and transited the Panama Canal on 19 January. Between 23 January and 3 February, she called at Veracruz, Mexico (where the cruiser Tacoma had been wrecked on 16 January), and at Tampico, before rejoining the fleet at Culebra on 10 February. On 1 March, she departed the Canal Zone for Mare Island, where she was overhauled between 19 March and 7 May. Between 26 June and 12 July, she acted as plane guard for aircraft flying from San Diego to Seattle and rejoined the fleet in Puget Sound on 13 July. She returned to San Diego on 1 October.

On 27 April 1925, Shirk arrived at Pearl Harbor with the United States Fleet for combined exercises. On 1 July, the Battle Fleet sailed on a goodwill cruise to the Southwest Pacific, and Shirk visited Melbourne; Lyttelton and Wellington; and American Samoa before returning to San Diego on 26 September. She was overhauled at Mare Island from 11 January to 26 February 1926 and operated out of San Diego until departing on 14 June for summer exercises off Washington. She returned to San Diego on 1 September 1926 and again received repairs at Mare Island from 30 December 1926 to 4 February 1927.

On 7 February 1927, Shirk sailed from San Diego and participated in exercises off Panama and, after transiting the Canal on 5 March, operated in the Caribbean with the fleet. She departed the Caribbean on 22 April and visited New York, and conducted a joint Army and Navy exercise in Narragansett Bay before arriving at Hampton Roads on 29 May 1927 for the Presidential review. She arrived in the Panama Canal Zone on 9 June 1927 for duty off Nicaragua with the Special Service Squadron, protecting lives and property of American and other foreign nationals there supporting peacekeeping operations. She patrolled off Nicaragua from 1 to 23 July, and returned to San Diego on 23 August. During operations off San Diego, she rescued a disabled man on SS Georgian and carried him into port on 29 August.

Shirk underwent overhaul at Mare Island from 26 February to 11 April 1928 and arrived at Pearl Harbor on 28 April with the fleet, having participated in Fleet Problem VIII en route. She returned to San Diego on 23 June and operated there for the rest of the year. Between 27 January and 6 February 1929, she participated in fleet exercises off Panama, and then underwent overhaul at Mare Island from 24 February to 20 June.

== Fate ==
She then operated at San Diego until she was decommissioned there on 8 February 1930. Shirk was struck from the Navy list on 22 July 1930, scrapped at Mare Island, and her hulk sold there on 27 January 1931 to P. J. Willett.

As of 2012, no other U.S. Navy ship has been named Shirk.
