= Fortescue Cuming =

Irish-born traveler and author (1762–1828)

- Portrait by Charles Balthazar Julien Févret de Saint-Mémin, 1796
- Born: February 26, 1762; Strabane, County Tyrone, Ireland
- Died: 1828 (aged 65–66); Vermilionville (now Lafayette), Louisiana, United States
- Spouse: Phoebe Harisson (m. 1784; died 1821)
- Children: 7
- Writing career
- Period: Traveler
- Notable work: Sketches of a Tour to the Western Country

Fortescue Cuming (February 26, 1762 – 1828) was an Irish-born traveler and author. He is known for Sketches of a Tour to the Western Country, an account of journeys made from 1807 to 1809 through what was then the western frontier of the United States, including Pennsylvania, Ohio, Kentucky, the Ohio and Mississippi valleys, the Mississippi Territory, and West Florida. His account was later republished by historian Reuben Gold Thwaites and has been used by historians of early western Pennsylvania and Kentucky.

== Early life ==
Engraving of Harrison by Saint-Mémin in 1797

Cuming was born at Strabane, County Tyrone, Ireland, on February 26, 1762. He studied medicine and traveled in France, Switzerland, and Italy before going to New York. In 1784, he married Phoebe Harisson, the sixteen-year-old daughter of Thomas Harisson; the couple had seven children. Cuming subsequently lived in New York, Trinidad, and Westchester, before establishing a home at Cedar Hill, outside New Haven, Connecticut, in 1792. Portraits of Cuming and his wife by Saint-Mémin date to 1797.

In 1806, Cuming was in England, where he purchased land in Ohio. His interest in the property prompted the western journey that became the subject of his published travel account.

== Western travels ==
Cuming left Philadelphia on January 8, 1807, traveling on foot toward Pittsburgh. He passed through Lancaster, Middletown, and Harrisburg, reaching Carlisle on January 24. The following day he continued to Shippensburg. From there, he traveled through Strasburg, now Upper Strasburg, rather than taking the stage road through Chambersburg. According to Thwaites's later reconstruction of the journey, Cuming arrived in Pittsburgh on February 2 after twenty-seven days on the road and remained there through the winter, spring, and early summer.

On July 18, Cuming left Pittsburgh by boat and descended the Ohio River to Maysville, Kentucky, arriving on July 30. From there he traveled on horseback through Kentucky to Lexington and Frankfort, returning to Maysville on August 5. He then crossed into Ohio to inspect his land and traveled through Chillicothe, Lancaster, and Zanesville to Wheeling, before returning to Pittsburgh on August 21.

Cuming resumed his travels from Maysville on May 7, 1808, descending the Ohio and Mississippi rivers toward Mississippi Territory. He reached Bayou Pierre on June 6. Later that year he traveled by horseback through settlements in Mississippi Territory and into Spanish West Florida as far as Baton Rouge, returning to Bruinsburg in September. Thwaites believed that this part of the journey was undertaken with the possibility of settling in Mississippi Territory; Cuming dated the preface to his eventual book there on October 20, 1809.

== Sketches of a Tour ==
Cuming's account was published at Pittsburgh in 1810 as Sketches of a Tour to the Western Country, through the States of Ohio and Kentucky; a Voyage down the Ohio and Mississippi Rivers, and a Trip through the Mississippi Territory, and Part of West Florida. The manuscript came into the possession of Pittsburgh printer Zadok Cramer, who added notes and an extensive appendix containing material from other sources. It was printed and published by Cramer, Spear & Eichbaum. In addition to Cuming's narrative, the original volume included material concerning the geography and towns of the West, diseases, and Native American customs and antiquities.

The book did not receive another edition until 1904, when Thwaites made it volume IV of his series Early Western Travels, 1748–1846. Thwaites omitted much of Cramer's appendix and argued that the value of Cuming's narrative lay in the detail and relative impartiality of his observations. The Dictionary of American Biography later described the book as an accurate and detailed record of social and political conditions in the western backcountry.

Historians have drawn on Cuming's observations of both western Pennsylvania and Kentucky. In a 1935 study of social life in western Pennsylvania, Elizabeth Hawthorn Buck used his "invaluable" descriptions of frontier hospitality and Pittsburgh's musical, theatrical, political, and social life. Cuming described the city's Apollonian Society, an association of amateur musicians, and two dramatic societies that performed in the courthouse during the winter. His assessment of Pittsburgh society was less favorable in other respects: he attributed the city's reputation for limited hospitality partly to intense political divisions and criticized what he regarded as the social pretensions of its legal profession, complaining that lawyers and "even their students and pupils" assumed the title of "esquire".

Thomas D. Clark, assessing travelers' accounts as sources for Kentucky history in 1940, characterized Cuming's observations of the state as "reasonably sane" and his information as "definitely valuable," adding that he had "the eye of a reporter."

== Later life ==
Cuming apparently did not return to Phoebe after his western travels; she was buried in New Haven in 1821. He subsequently married a Miss Butler. Cuming died at Vermilionville, Louisiana, in 1828.
