= Hard Times Plantation =

Historic Louisiana location

Coordinates: 32.0379°N 91.1242°W

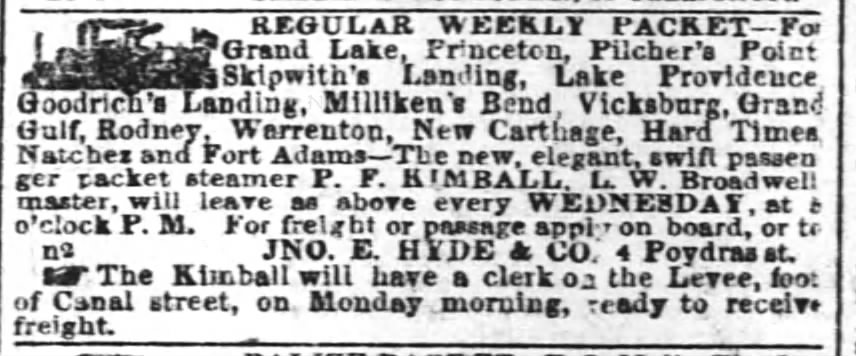
Hard Times was served by a packet boat as of 1854

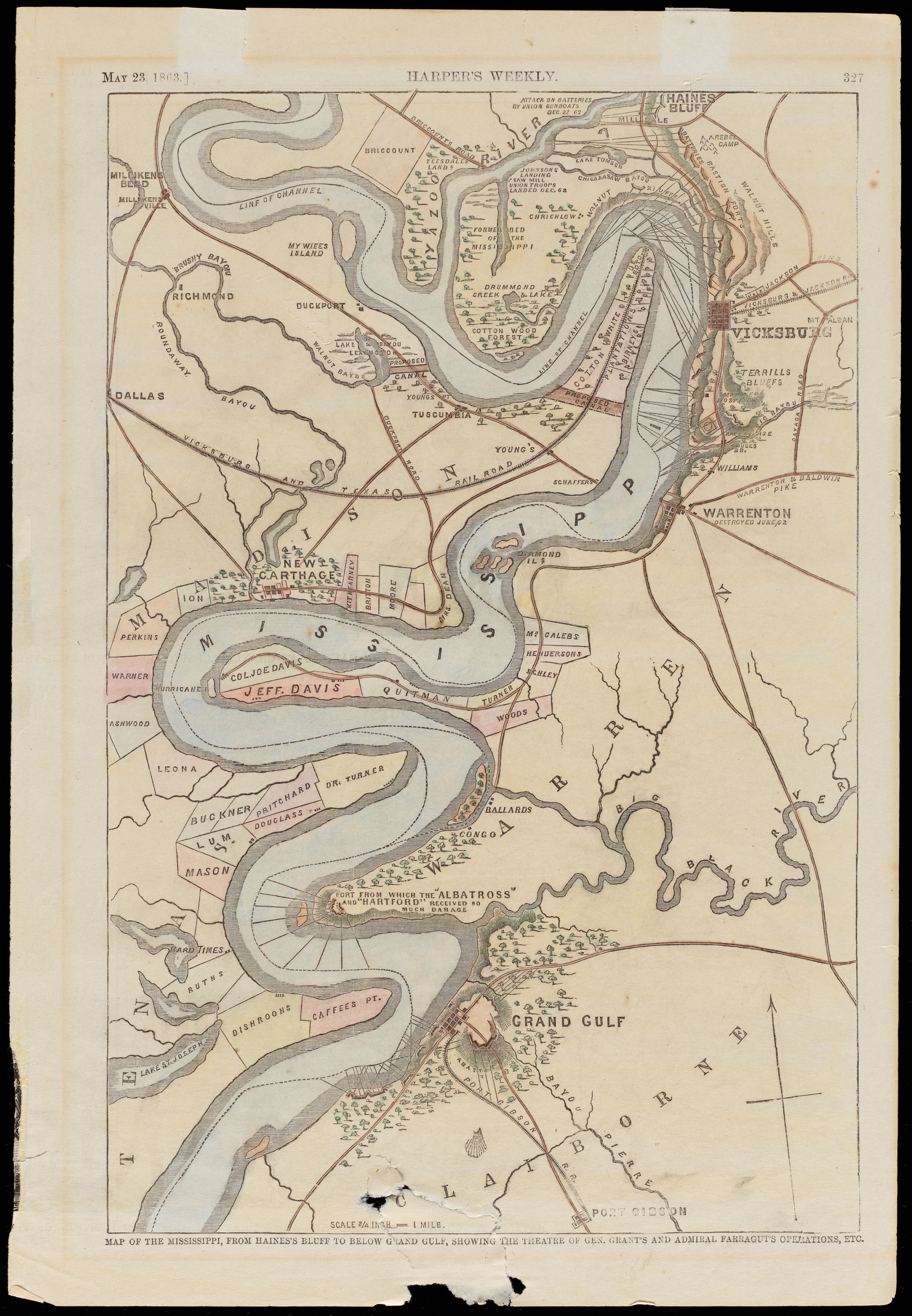
Hard Times Plantation visible on "Map of the Mississippi, from Haines's Bluff to Below Grand Gulf, Showing the Theatre of Gen. Grant's and Admiral Farragut's Operations" (Harper's Weekly, May 23, 1863)

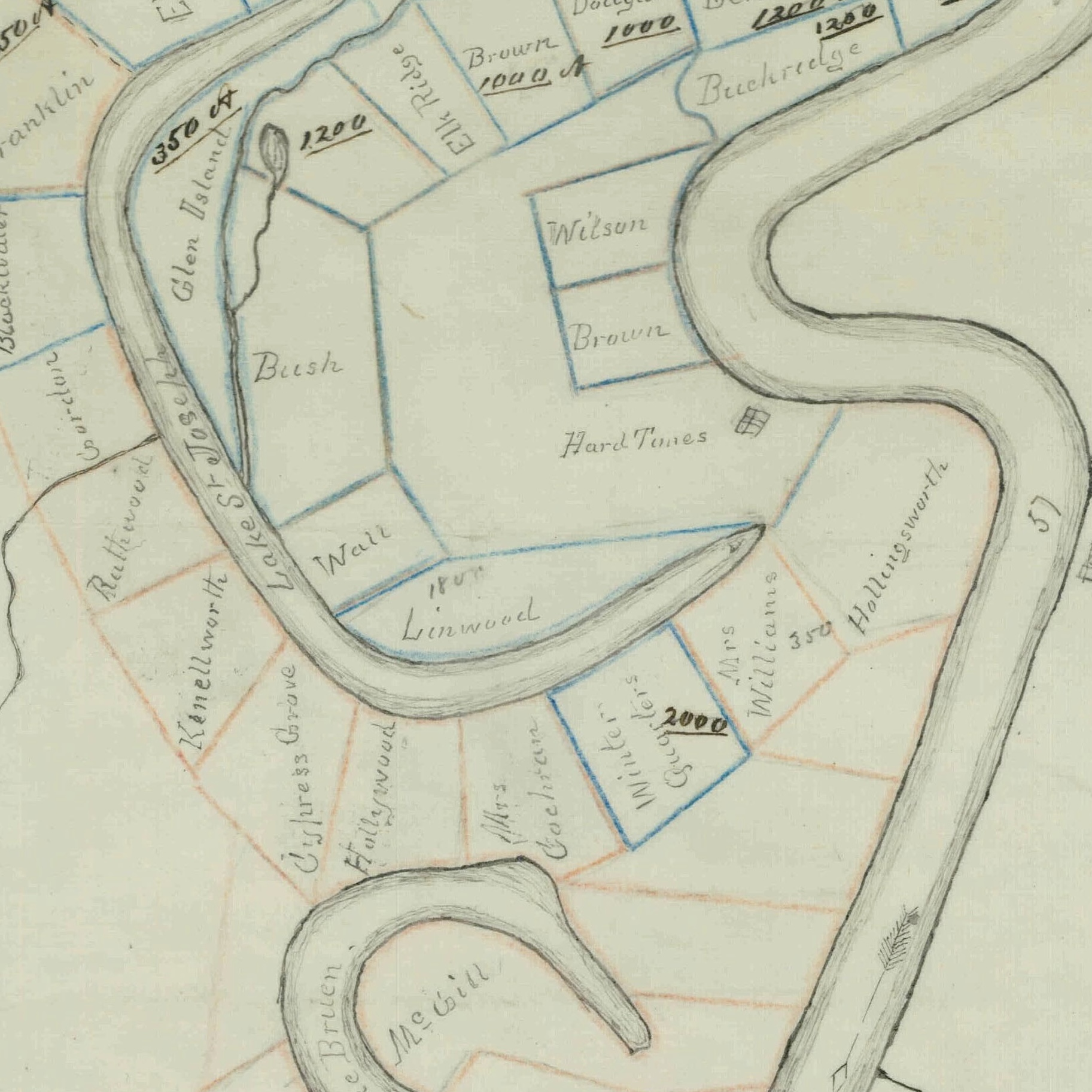
Location of Hard Times Plantation, mapped sometime between 1866 and 1874

Hard Times mapped sometime between 1866 and 1874, showing three buildings along the Mississippi River

The Hard Times Plantation is located in Tensas Parish, Louisiana, and was used as a staging area by the Union Army in the Vicksburg Campaign. At the time of the Vicksburg campaign, Hard Times was owned by Dr. Hollingsworth.

== See also ==
- Disharoon's plantation
- Winter Quarters State Historic Site
