= USS Tuscumbia (1862) =

Gunboat of the United States Navy

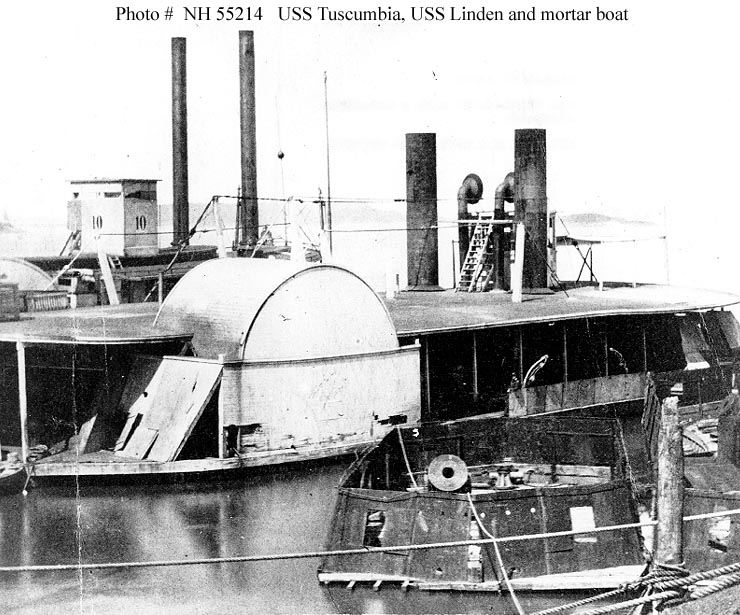
- Tuscumbia circa 1863. USS Linden is behind her and a mortar boat is in front

History

United States
- Name: USS Tuscumbia
- Builder: Joseph Brown, Cincinnati, Ohio
- Laid down: 1862
- Launched: 2 December 1862
- Commissioned: 12 March 1863
- Decommissioned: February 1865
- Fate: Sold, 29 November 1865

General characteristics
- Type: Steam gunboat
- Displacement: 915 long tons (930 t)
- Length: 178 ft
- Beam: 75 ft
- Draft: 7 ft (2.1 m)
- Propulsion: 1 x shaft, 4 x steam engines
- Speed: 10 knots
- Complement: 130 officers & men
- Armament: 3 × 11 in (280 mm) Dahlgren smoothbores; 2 × 9 in (230 mm) Dahlgren smoothbores

The first USS Tuscumbia was a gunboat in the United States Navy during the American Civil War. She was named for the town of Tuscumbia, Alabama, which had been named for a Cherokee chief.

Tuscumbia was built in 1862 at Cincinnati, Ohio, by Joseph Brown; launched on 2 December; and commissioned at Cairo, Illinois; on 12 March 1863, Lieutenant Commander James W. Shirk in command. She had two engines for the two sidewheels and two smaller engines for her two screws.

== Service history ==
Tuscumbia assisted in the recapture of Fort Heiman on the Tennessee River from 12 March to 14 March 1863. The vessel destroyed Confederate shipping used to ferry troops across the river and enfiladed Southern entrenchments situated behind the fort. At the end of the month, she entered the Mississippi River.

In the spring and early summer of 1863, Tuscumbia performed valuable service during amphibious operations against Vicksburg, Mississippi. On 1 April, she carried Admiral David D. Porter and Generals Ulysses S. Grant and William Tecumseh Sherman on a reconnaissance expedition up the Yazoo River to determine the practicality of landing a force above Vicksburg at Hayne's Bluff. Tuscumbia withdrew under heavy fire from shore batteries, prompting the decision to shift operations below Vicksburg to Grand Gulf. Tuscumbia participated in the run past the Vicksburg batteries to New Carthage on the night of 16 April and 17 April 1863, towing the damaged transport Forest Queen to safety. On 20 April, USS General Price and Tuscumbia reconnoitered the Mississippi from New Carthage to Grand Gulf and took part in the attack on the Confederate works at Grand Gulf on 29 April. During the attack, Tuscumbia suffered five casualties and was put out of action after taking 81 hits.

Tuscumbia was quickly repaired and fired upon the Vicksburg batteries on 19 May and 22 May. During the attack on the 22nd, Benton, Mound City, Carondelet, and Tuscumbia silenced three water batteries and destroyed four guns. Tuscumbia returned to the naval station at Memphis, Tennessee, for repairs in August but was laid up in November. She was repaired at Memphis in May 1864 and was assigned patrol duty between Cairo and the head of the Tennessee River.

After further repairs at Mound City, Illinois, in October, she was inactivated in February 1865.

Tuscumbia was sold at auction at Mound City to W. K. Adams on 29 November 1865.

== See also ==
- Anaconda Plan
- Mississippi Squadron
