= Chickasaw Bayou =

Stream in Mississippi, U.S.

Coordinates: 32.4426425°N 90.8573259°W

Chickasaw Bayou is a stream in the U.S. state of Mississippi. It is a tributary to the Yazoo River.

Chickasaw Bayou derives its name from the Chickasaw tribe.

The Battle of Chickasaw Bayou was fought near this stream in 1862.
