= Disharoon's Plantation =

American Civil War location

Coordinates: 32.02541°N 91.10804°W

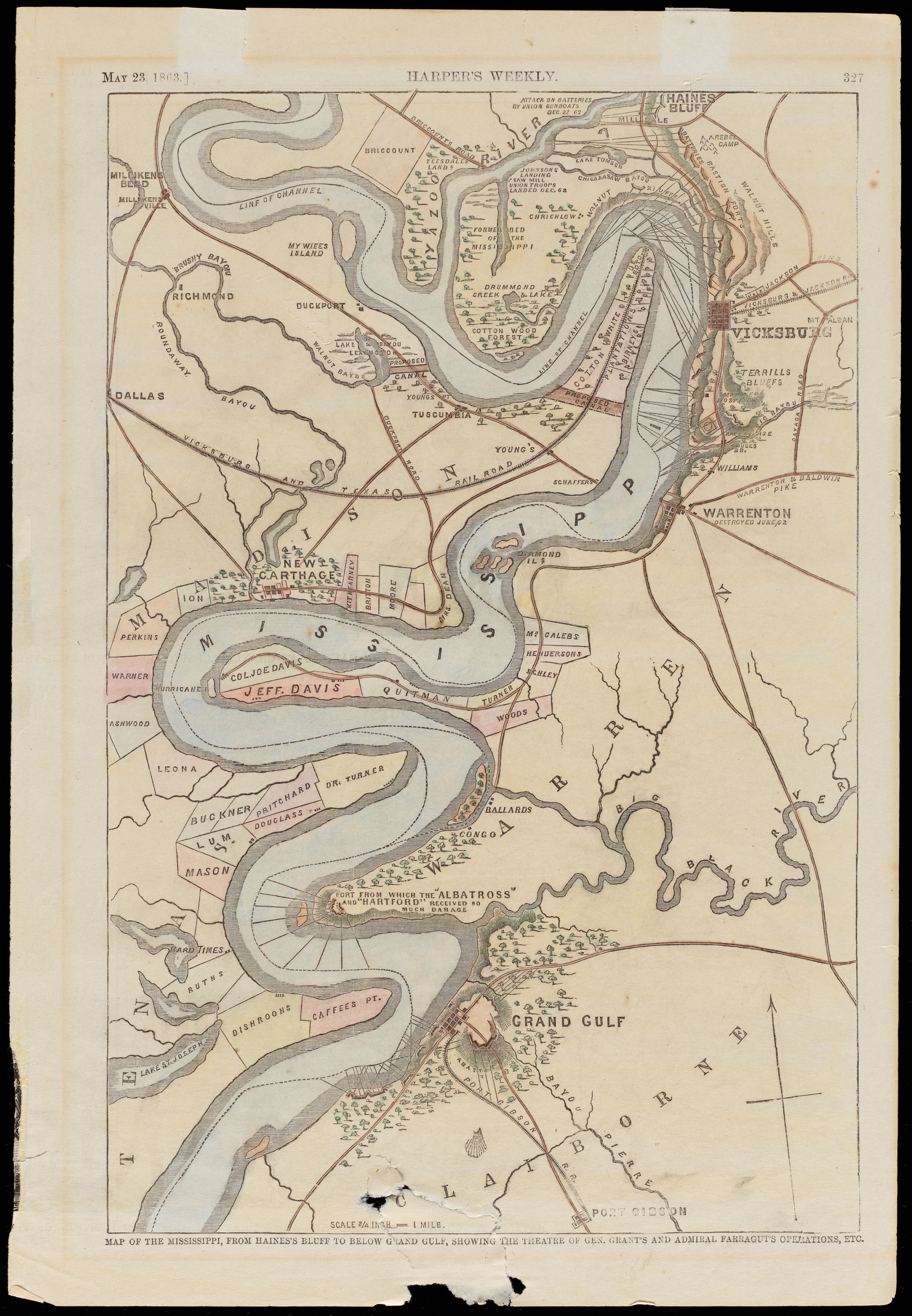
Disharoon's plantation visible on "Map of the Mississippi, from Haines's Bluff to Below Grand Gulf, Showing the Theatre of Gen. Grant's and Admiral Farragut's Operations" (Harper's Weekly, May 23, 1863)

Disharoon's Plantation was located in Tensas Parish, Louisiana and was used as a steamboat landing on the Mississippi River by Union Army General Ulysses S. Grant during the American Civil War.

== Before the war ==
The place "Disharoon's plantation" was likely so named because it had been the home of an early settler named William Disharoon, who "lived on the Louisiana side, below Grand Gulf," and died July 9, 1839. As of 1851 an 800-acre plantation in Tensas, located along the river 13 miles above St. Joe, was still described as the "Disharoon tract."

== American Civil War ==
Disharoon's Plantation occupied a high natural levee, fronted by a long stretch of steep bank that served as an excellent steamboat landing on the west bank of the Mississippi River approximately 6.5 mi (10.5 km) southwest of Grand Gulf, Mississippi and "three airline miles" south of Hard Times. According to geographer Warren Grabau, Disharoon's had some noted advantages as a staging point, compared to some Mississippi land, which was soggy swamp or impassable forest, namely that it had naturally high levee, and that it had "lots of cleared fields and lots of nice dry ground to camp on". Union Maj. Gen. John A. McClernand's XII Corps of the Army of the Tennessee occupied the plantation on April 29, 1863, after marching across the base of Coffee Point from Hard Times Plantation. Grant arrived at the plantation near dark on that evening, and made plans to land his forces on the Mississippi shore at Rodney, Mississippi, another 12 mi (19 km) downstream. Late that night an escaped slave informed him that there was an excellent steamboat landing, plus good roads into the interior, at Bruinsburg Landing, only 5 mi (8.0 km) downstream. Grant decided to land in Mississippi at Bruinsburg.

== Destruction ==
Disharoon's Plantation was destroyed by Mississippi River flood waters shortly after the Civil War.
