= Battle of Big Black River Bridge =

1863 battle of the American Civil War

- Part of the American Civil War
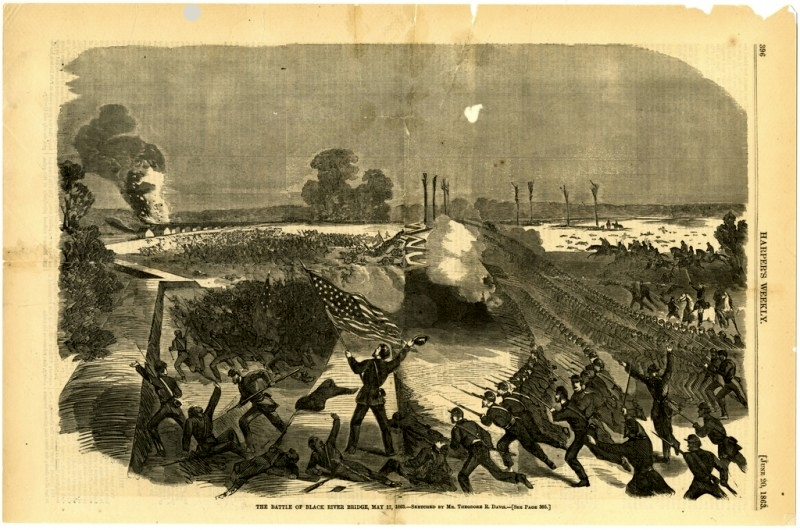
- The Battle of Big Black River Bridge, Harper's Weekly, June 20, 1863, issue
Date	May 17, 1863
Location	Hinds and Warren Counties, Mississippi 32°20′49″N 90°42′15″W
Result	Union victory

Belligerents
United States	Confederate States

Commanders and leaders
John McClernand	John Bowen; John Vaughn

Units involved
XIII Army Corps; 9th Division (Osterhaus); 10th Division (Smith); 14th Division (Carr)	Bowen's division Vaughn's brigade

Strength
12,370	5,000

Casualties and losses
Total 279; 39 killed 237 wounded 3 missing	1,751 captured killed and wounded unknown
- Location within Mississippi

The Battle of Big Black River Bridge was fought on May 17, 1863, as part of the Vicksburg Campaign of the American Civil War. During the war, the city of Vicksburg, Mississippi, was a key point on the Mississippi River. On April 30, 1863, a Union army commanded by Major General Ulysses S. Grant began crossing onto the east side of the Mississippi River as part of a campaign against Vicksburg. After engaging and defeating Confederate forces in several intermediate battles, Grant's army defeated Lieutenant General John C. Pemberton's troops at the decisive Battle of Champion Hill on May 16. During the retreat from Champion Hill battlefield, one division of Pemberton's army, commanded by Major General William W. Loring, was cut off from Pemberton's main body. Pemberton, retreating westwards towards Vicksburg, did not know the location of Loring's division, and he held a bridgehead on the east side of the Big Black River to cover Loring's anticipated withdrawal across the river on the morning of May 17.

The Confederate force east of the Big Black River was commanded by Brigadier General John S. Bowen and consisted of the two brigades of his division, the brigade of Brigadier General John C. Vaughn, and one additional regiment. Bowen's soldiers had taken heavy casualties at Champion Hill, and most of Vaughn's troops were conscripts of uncertain loyalty. On the morning of May 17, the Union XIII Corps commanded by Major General John A. McClernand approached the Confederate position. Two divisions and another brigade from a third deployed to face the Confederates. Union Brigadier General Michael Kelly Lawler advanced his troops into an meander scar in advance of the main Union line on the north end of the battlefield. From this sheltered position, Lawler's troops charged, striking the Confederate line in the region held by Vaughn's brigade.

Vaughn's troops broke, with the soldiers either running away or surrendering. The collapse of this portion of the line forced the rest of the Confederate troops to withdraw. The withdrawal became chaotic and 1,751 Confederate soldiers and 18 cannons were captured. The cannons were captured because their teams of horses were erroneously positioned on the other side of the Big Black River. The Union army suffered fewer than 300 casualties. The retreating Confederates burned both the railroad bridge over the Big Black River and a steamboat that had been serving as a bridge. Loring had already given up on rejoining his division to Pemberton's army and his troops marched to Jackson, Mississippi. On May 18, the Union army crossed the Big Black River. The surviving Confederate soldiers with Pemberton entered the fortifications at Vicksburg, and the siege of Vicksburg began the next day; it ended in the Confederate surrender on July 4, 1863.

== Background ==
Early in the American Civil War, the Union military leadership developed the Anaconda Plan, which was a strategy to defeat the Confederate States of America by controlling its coastline and major rivers. A significant component of this strategy was controlling the Mississippi River. Much of the Mississippi Valley fell under Union control in early 1862 after the capture of New Orleans, Louisiana, and several land victories. The strategically important city of Vicksburg, Mississippi, was still in Confederate hands, and it served as a strong defensive position that commanded the river and prevented the Union from separating the two halves of the Confederacy. Union Navy elements were sent upriver from New Orleans in May to try to take the city, a move that was unsuccessful. In late June, a joint army–navy expedition returned to make another campaign against Vicksburg. Union Navy leadership decided that the city could not be taken without more infantry, who were not forthcoming. An attempt to construct Williams's Canal across a meander of the river in June and July, bypassing Vicksburg, failed.

In late November, about 40,000 Union infantry commanded by Major General Ulysses S. Grant began moving south towards Vicksburg from a starting point in Tennessee. After a supply depot and part of his supply line were destroyed during the Holly Springs Raid and Forrest's West Tennessee Raid in December, Grant ordered a retreat. Meanwhile, another arm of the expedition under the command of Major General William T. Sherman left Memphis, Tennessee, on the same day as the Holly Springs Raid and traveled down the Mississippi River. After diverting up the Yazoo River, Sherman's troops began skirmishing with Confederate soldiers who were defending a line of hills above the Chickasaw Bayou. A Union attack on December 29 was defeated decisively at the Battle of Chickasaw Bayou, and Sherman's soldiers withdrew on January 1, 1863.

By late March, further attempts to bypass Vicksburg had failed. Grant then considered three plans: to withdraw to Memphis and retry the overland route through northern Mississippi; to move south along the west side of the Mississippi River, cross below Vicksburg, and then strike for the city; or to make an amphibious assault across the river directly against Vicksburg. An assault across the river risked heavy casualties, and a withdrawal to Memphis could be politically disastrous if the public perceived such a movement as a retreat. Grant then decided upon the downstream crossing. The advance along the west bank of the Mississippi began on March 29, spearheaded by Major General John A. McClernand's XIII Corps. The movement down the river was masked by decoy operations such as Steele's Greenville expedition, Streight's Raid, and Grierson's Raid. Confederate regional commander John C. Pemberton fell for the Union decoys (especially Grierson's Raid), and lost touch with the true tactical situation, believing Grant was withdrawing.

== Prelude ==
Grant's Operations against Vicksburg. Confederate (dashed lines) Union (solid lines)

On April 29, the Union Navy's Mississippi Squadron, commanded by David Dixon Porter, (Note: Porter's rank was formally commander, but he had been elevated to acting rear admiral in October 1862.) bombarded the Confederate defenses at Grand Gulf, Mississippi, but the resulting Battle of Grand Gulf failed to drive the Confederates away. With Grand Gulf still in enemy hands, Grant decided to cross further downriver. McClernand's corps, which formed the lead element of Grant's army, crossed the river at Bruinsburg, Mississippi, beginning on the morning of April 30. Brigadier General John S. Bowen, the Confederate commander at Grand Gulf, would be flanked out of the position there if Grant crossed Bayou Pierre. Bowen moved a portion of his force to Port Gibson to block the Union movements, but he did not have enough troops to destroy Grant's bridgehead and had to hold out for further reinforcements. The two armies collided on May 1, and the Battle of Port Gibson began. After a day of fighting, the Confederates were defeated; they abandoned Grand Gulf on May 3.

After Port Gibson, Grant moved his troops to the northeast. McClernand advanced on the Union left with his XIII corps, Sherman and his XV Corps advanced in the center, and Major General James B. McPherson's XVII Corps moved on the right. On the morning of May 12, McPherson's corps encountered Confederate troops near Raymond, Mississippi, bringing on the Battle of Raymond. The Union won the battle, but the fighting at Raymond led Grant to change his plans; instead of moving directly north, he swung over towards Jackson, Mississippi. This was intended to disperse a Confederate force gathering there, under the command of General Joseph E. Johnston, who decided to abandon Jackson in the face of the Union pressure. A delaying action was fought on May 14 as the Confederates bought time to evacuate the city. The Union took the city and destroyed military facilities within it.

After he had already withdrawn from Jackson, Johnston sent Pemberton orders to move east, stating that Johnston's army would move west and catch Grant's command between the two Confederate forces. However, Johnston then marched his army away from the area in which a combination with Pemberton could have been easily be made. Pemberton decided that Johnston's orders were not compatible with a previous directive that he had received from the Confederate President Jefferson Davis that Vicksburg and Port Hudson, Louisiana, should be held. While Pemberton favored making a stand behind the Big Black River, he was convinced by some of his subordinate officers to make an offensive strike where Grant's supply line was believed to be. When planning this offensive, Pemberton did not know that Grant had forgone a traditional line of communications during his movement inland. (Note: There has been academic debate regarding the nature and extent of Grant's supply line, including arguing that he did not have one. Grant did not have a traditional supply line in the sense of supplies moving continually back and forth to the various front line commands. Rather, he had reinforcements arriving at the front escort groups of wagons to the front line commands more sporadically. His soldiers also relied on food and supplies foraged from the surrounding countryside.) Beginning the offensive, the Confederates started a difficult march slowed by poor road conditions and a washed-out bridge, while Grant moved west in three columns towards Edwards Station. On the morning of May 16, elements of the Union and Confederate armies made contact, and Pemberton ordered his force to march back to Edwards. The ensuing Battle of Champion Hill was a decisive Confederate defeat. Major General William W. Loring's Confederate division was cut off during the retreat from the field and withdrew using a different route, separated from the rest of the army. Pemberton did not know the location of Loring's division.

== Battle ==
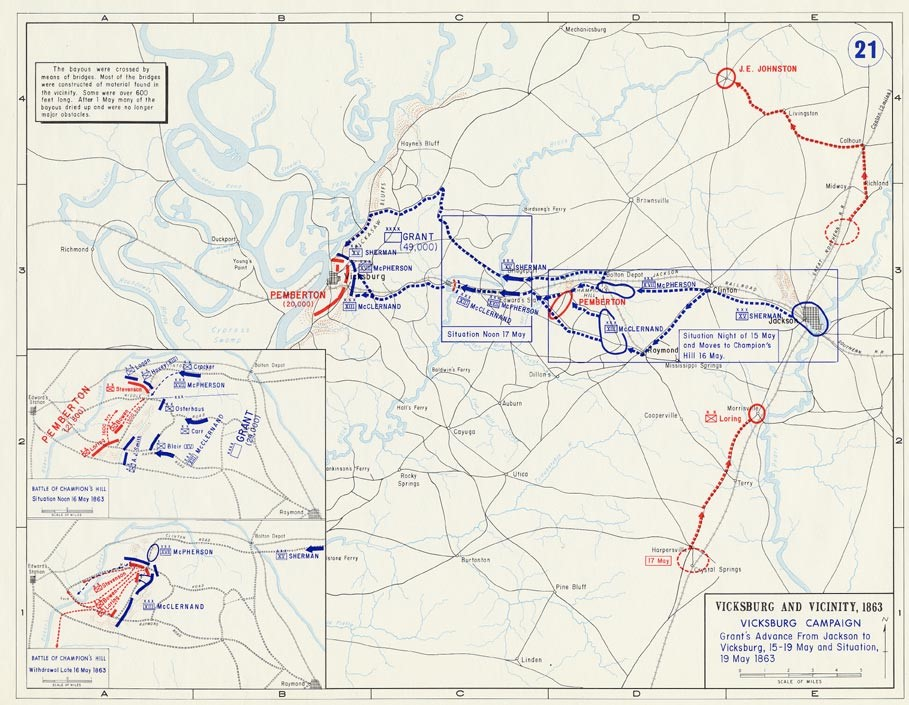
Map of the movements of the armies from May 15–19, 1863

In preparation for what was likely to transpire, Pemberton had a portion of his army hold the line east of the Big Black River to prevent Loring from being cut off from the main Confederate body at the river crossing. In early May, the Confederate defensive line was laid out by Samuel H. Lockett. The fortifications were made of cotton bales and dirt. To the south lay Gin Lake: the Confederate right flank was at the lake with the line running north to the Big Black River, which made a bend east of the bridge across it. Both the Jackson Road and the Southern Railroad of Mississippi ran through the center of the Confederate line and crossed the river. The tracks of the railroad ran on a raised roadbed. While the area west of the bridge contained 60-foot (18 m) high hills, the area east of the river was flat. A bayou ran about 0.75 miles (1.21 km) east of the railroad bridge, cutting its course in front of most of the Confederate line and emptying into the Big Black River at the north end. The Confederate line was just west of the bayou, and trees were felled at the bayou to form an abatis. The southern portion of the Confederate line contained several artillery positions and faced flat, open fields to the east, while the northern part of the line contained only one artillery position and its field of fire was obstructed by woods. At the Confederate far left, a smaller set of works had been built east of the bayou, in a position where it could enfilade a Union advance. This set of works could contain only one regiment. Behind the Confederate line but east of the river were a pair of blockhouses that had been built earlier in the year to protect the bridge against cavalry raids. A secondary bridge was created by turning a small steamboat named Dot crossways in the river where a ferry had existed; the boat's machinery was removed and planks were placed on the decks. This position was 11 miles (18 km) east of Vicksburg.

Manning the position was Pemberton's rear guard, which consisted of Brigadier General John C. Vaughn's brigade, Bowen's division, and the 4th Mississippi Infantry Regiment. Bowen commanded this 5,000-strong force, which he deemed insufficient to strongly defend the entire Confederate defensive works. The Confederates had 18 cannons. Vaughn's soldiers were inexperienced, mostly conscripts from the East Tennessee region, whose populace was heavily pro-Union. Although they were fresh, their loyalty to the Confederacy was uncertain. Bowen's division was the elite unit of Pemberton's army, but they were exhausted after hard fighting at Port Gibson and Champion Hill and had suffered nearly 1,000 casualties in the latter battle, out of about 4,500 troops engaged. Pemberton selected Bowen's division for the rear guard as Major General Carter L. Stevenson's division had already passed through the area and the rest of Pemberton's army was either at Vicksburg or with Loring. Colonel Francis M. Cockrell's Missouri brigade held the southern portion of the Confederate line and the area where the Jackson Road crossed it, as Bowen considered this unit to be his best and he expected the Union attack to fall there. Vaughn's soldiers and the 4th Mississippi were positioned in an area north of the railroad where the Union was least expected to attack, and Brigadier General Martin E. Green's brigade held the far left. If the Confederates were forced to retreat, they would have to cross open ground to the bridge and Dot, which would become bottlenecks in a retreat.

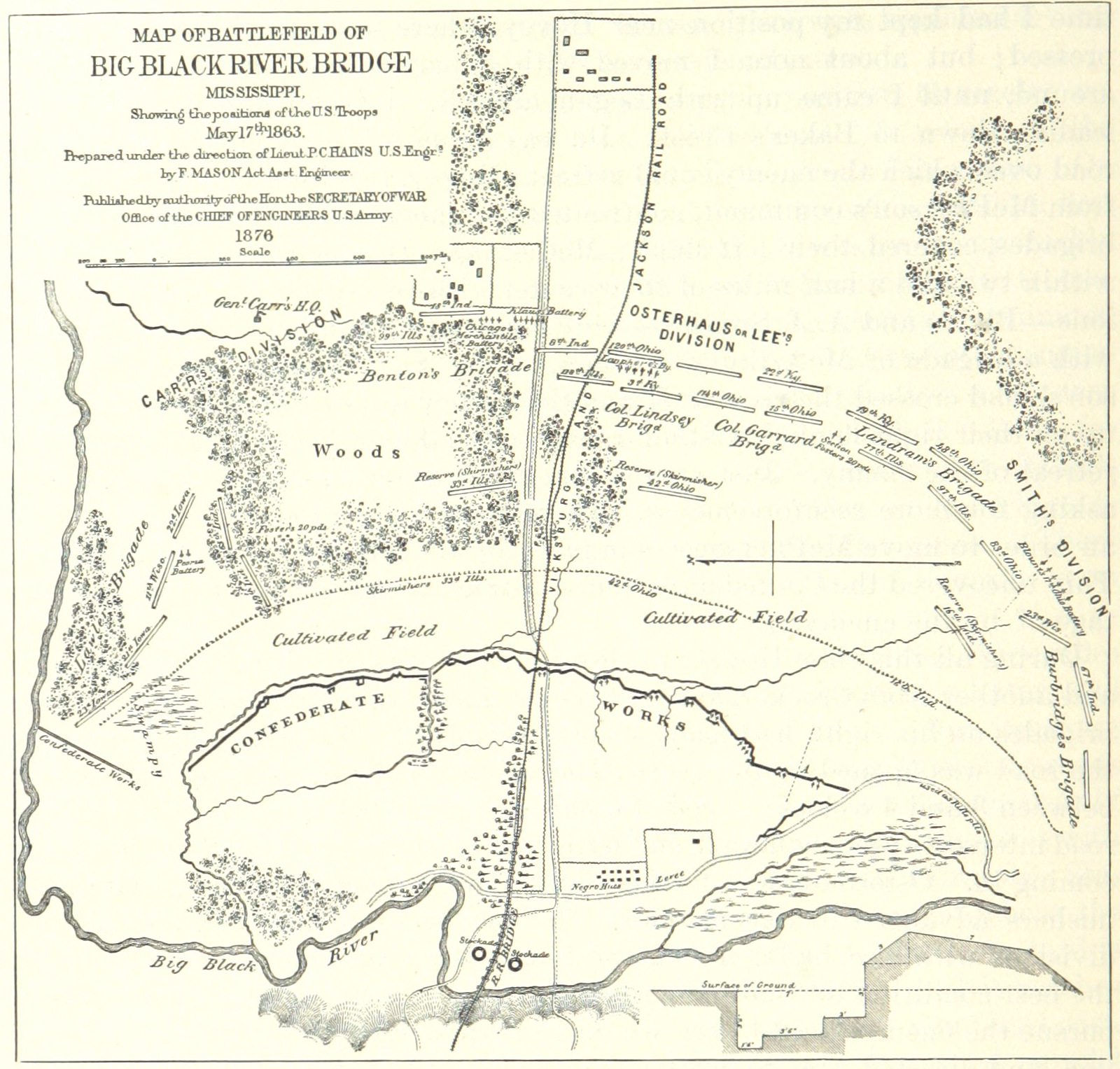
Map of the battle

Early on the morning of May 17, McClernand's troops advanced through Edwards and then encountered the Confederate line. His advance was led by the division of Brigadier General Eugene Carr. Carr's lead brigade was commanded by Brigadier General William P. Benton, with the 33rd Illinois Infantry Regiment in front as skirmishers. The Illinoisans encountered the Confederate lines, and they then took up a position in the woods facing the north end of the Confederate line. Carr was informed of the encounter and brought up more troops. Benton's troops took up a position in the fields east of the woods on the Union right, and Brigadier General Michael Kelly Lawler's brigade formed south of the road. One of Green's regiments, the 1st Missouri Cavalry Regiment (dismounted), had remained on the far side of the Big Black River, but Bowen now ordered it across the river and into the works on the east side of the bayou. This movement worried Carr, who shifted Lawler to Benton's right, while Brigadier General Peter J. Osterhaus's division deployed to the south. Brigadier General Theophilus Garrard's brigade was the left portion of Osterhaus's line, and that of Colonel Daniel W. Lindsey was to the right.

The Union artillery opened fire, and an artillery duel developed. While the Confederate soldiers took cover behind their defenses, the Union soldiers lay flat on the ground, as their position did not provide any cover. Lindsey advanced his brigade west along the railroad 300 yards (270 m), placing his troops ahead of the rest of the Union line. Osterhaus wanted to position Garrard's troops behind Lindsey's, but it was believed that Lawler needed assistance, so two of Garrard's regiments, the 49th Indiana Infantry and 69th Indiana Infantry, were sent to support the Union right. Osterhaus suffered a leg wound during the exchange when Confederate fire exploded an artillery limber; Osterhaus was replaced by Brigadier General Albert Lee. Grant was confident of victory, and at 8:00 am sent a message to Sherman stating that he believed that the Confederates would be forced to retreat in such a rapid fashion that they could not destroy the bridge. The Confederates, meanwhile, had such poor morale that Lockett believed the position could not be held; he requested and received permission to prepare the bridge and Dot for burning.

Confederate attention was drawn to the center, near the railroad, by the Union artillery fire. Lawler believed that the remains of a meander scar near the Big Black River would shelter his brigade, and had three regiments – the 11th Wisconsin Infantry, the 21st Iowa Infantry, and the 23rd Iowa Infantry – dash across open ground to reach the depression. Two cannons were positioned in a small clearing between the right of the woods and the Big Black River, and with the 22nd Iowa Infantry Regiment in support. This position allowed Lawler to enfilade the Confederate position east of the bayou, as well as part of the primary defensive works. This advance was accomplished without many casualties. While these movements were occurring, Brigadier General Stephen G. Burbridge's brigade of Brigadier General A. J. Smith's division arrived and was positioned on the Union far left.

The two regiments sent from Garrard's brigade took the position previously occupied by the 22nd Iowa, and they also moved into the meander scar. Colonel William Kinsman, the commander of the 23rd Iowa, proposed to Lawler that his regiment should attack the Confederates. Kinsman's reasoning was that the Confederates would only have time to fire one volley before the Union soldiers reached the defenses, and the Confederates might not put up a stiff fight after the Champion Hill defeat. Lawler ordered a charge by his whole brigade; with the 21st and 23rd Iowa in the front rank while the other two regiments charged behind. His soldiers were ordered not to fire before reaching the Confederate line. The attack quickly moved across the front of the 1st Missouri Cavalry (dismounted) and out of the regiment's field of fire, although not before Kinsman was killed and the commander of the 21st Iowa, Colonel Samuel Merrill, was wounded. (Note: Bearss states that Lawler's brigade suffered about 200 casualties at the hands of the 1st Missouri Cavalry (dismounted), while Ballard states that the Confederate regiment inflicted few losses on Lawler besides the two colonels. The historian Timothy B. Smith refers to "scores" of Union soldiers who fell during the charge.) The 49th and 69th Indiana joined the attack; while Lawler's soldiers advanced at an angle across Green's front and struck one of Vaughn's regiments, the 61st Tennessee Infantry Regiment. Green's troops fired a volley into Lawler's brigade that the historian Timothy B. Smith describes as "wild and ragged". Lawler's soldiers stopped to fire once they reached the abatis; the Tennesseans were routed and the defenders either ran away or surrendered. Bearss describes the attack, which took three minutes, as one of the shortest of the war.

The hole in the Confederate line reached to the railroad, and Green's troops withdrew as well, although some were captured. In the 1st Missouri Cavalry (dismounted), 90 soldiers and the unit's commander, Colonel Elijah Gates, were captured. Cockrell watched the Confederate left run away and ordered his troops to withdraw, as their position was no longer tenable. Cockrell's retreat became chaotic as well. Confederate artillery west of the river provided covering fire for the retreat. Benton's brigade attacked around the time Lawler broke through the line. Burbridge's and Albert Lee's forces charged the Confederate defenses, only to meet no resistance. Once almost all of the fleeing Confederates crossed the bridge, Lockett had the bridge and Dot set on fire. He then formed a new line west of the river by using the brigades of Brigadier Generals Stephen D. Lee and William E. Baldwin, who had arrived from Bovina, Mississippi, and part of Landis's Missouri Battery that had been positioned on the west bank before the battle. Two other Confederate steamboats, Charm and Paul Jones, which had been located downstream from the bridge were also burned.

Albert Lee's soldiers spent the afternoon after the battle in low-intensity fighting across the river against a Confederate force while Carr and Smith's troops patrolled the field. The Union reported the capture of 1,751 Confederates as well as 18 cannons. The Confederate artillery losses came about because the horse teams for the cannons had been erroneously moved across the river before the battle for unclear reasons. Green reported having suffered 485 casualties while two of Vaughn's regiments combined for 546 losses. Most of the casualties were prisoners or those missing in action. Few of the casualties occurred before the line fell to pieces. One of Vaughn's regiments, Cockrell's brigade, and the 4th Mississippi did not file casualty reports, but they were known to have suffered heavily in soldiers captured. Union casualties were 279 soldiers killed, wounded, or missing, of which 39 were killed, 237 wounded, and 3 missing. About 200 of the casualties were in Lawler's brigade. Grant's 12-year old son Fred was wounded in the leg while following the pursuit of the routed Confederates; Fred was present with his father for the entire campaign. Sergeant William Wesley Kendall of the 49th Indiana Infantry Regiment was awarded the Medal of Honor for leading a company in the main Union charge; he was among the first Union soldiers to enter the Confederate fortifications.

== Aftermath and preservation ==
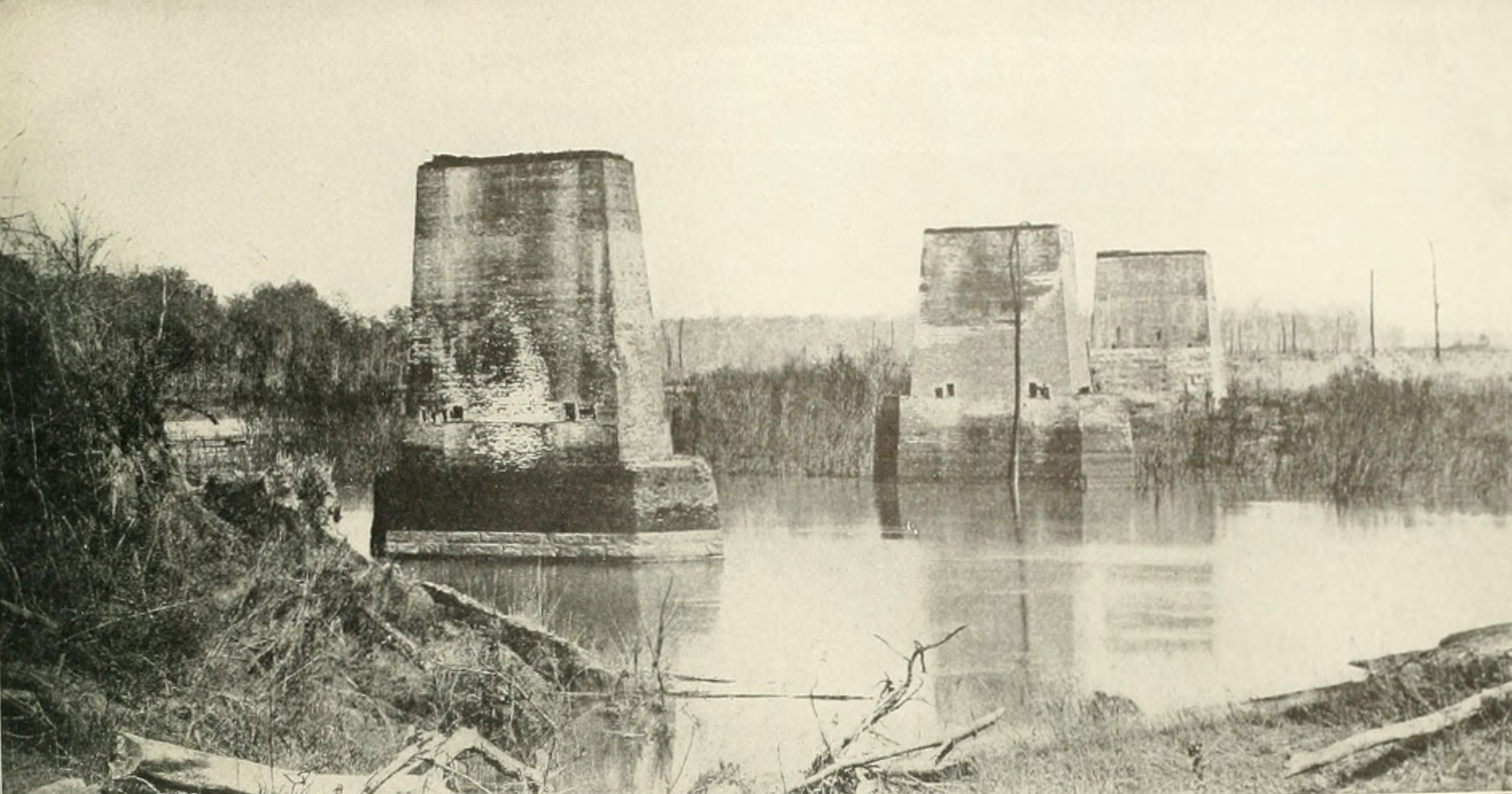
Ruins of the bridge after the battle

The Confederates withdrew into the Vicksburg fortifications. Pemberton ordered several outlying positions withdrawn into the main lines and the Vicksburg defenses were also physically improved. There was much outrage against Pemberton within the Confederate army due to the outcome of the movements and battles of the last several days. Loring had noticed light from fires in Union-occupied Edwards on the morning of May 17, and with the way blocked he marched his troops to Jackson, where they joined forces with Johnston on May 19. McClernand had a replacement bridge built over the Big Black River on the morning of May 18, while McPherson's and Sherman's corps crossed at other points. Sherman sent a cavalry regiment towards Snyder's Bluff, where the Confederate fortifications were found to have been abandoned, while Grant's army had regained a connection to the Union Navy elements on the Yazoo River. Sherman's main force came into contact with the Confederate defenders of Vicksburg, and McClernand and McPherson's forces arrived late that day. The Siege of Vicksburg began. Believing that the Confederates in Vicksburg could be easily defeated, Grant launched major attacks on May 19 and 22. Both attacks were repulsed bloodily, and Grant settled in for siege operations. The Confederates ran low on supplies, and Pemberton surrendered on July 4. The fall of Vicksburg was one of the key events of the war.

The site of the battle was listed on the National Register of Historic Places in 1971 as the Big Black River Battlefield. As of 2023, portions of the piers of the railroad bridge existing during the battle still remain at the crossing of the Big Black River. A trail runs along the river bank, and a historical marker is placed in the vicinity of the battlefield, although the battlefield itself is privately owned.

== Sources ==
- Ballard, Michael B. (2004). Vicksburg: The Campaign that Opened the Mississippi. Chapel Hill, North Carolina: University of North Carolina Press. ISBN 0-8078-2893-9.
- Bearss, Edwin C. (1991) [1986]. The Campaign for Vicksburg. Vol. II: Grant Strikes a Fatal Blow. Dayton, Ohio: Morningside Bookshop. ISBN 0-89029-313-9.
- Bearss, Edwin C. (2007) [2006]. Fields of Honor. Washington, D.C.: National Geographic. ISBN 978-1-4262-0093-9.
- Grabau, Warren (2000). Ninety-eight Days: A Geographer's View of the Vicksburg Campaign. Knoxville, Tennessee: University of Tennessee Press. ISBN 978-1-57233-068-9.
- Kennedy, Frances H. (1998). The Civil War Battlefield Guide (2nd ed.). Boston/New York: Houghton Mifflin. ISBN 978-0-395-74012-5.
- Miller, Donald L. (2019). Vicksburg: Grant's Campaign that Broke the Confederacy. New York, New York: Simon and Schuster. ISBN 978-1-4516-4139-4.
- Shea, William L.; Winschel, Terrence J. (2003). Vicksburg Is the Key: The Struggle for the Mississippi River. Lincoln, Nebraska: University of Nebraska Press. ISBN 978-0-8032-9344-1.
- Smith, Timothy B. (2006) [2004]. Champion Hill: Decisive Battle for Vicksburg. El Dorado Hills, California: Savas Beatie. ISBN 1-932714-19-7.
- Smith, Timothy B. (2013). ""A Victory Could Hardly Have Been More Complete": The Battle of Big Black River Bridge". In Woodworth, Steven E.; Grear, Charles D. (eds.). The Vicksburg Campaign: March 29 – May 18, 1863. Carbondale, Illinois: Southern Illinois University Press. pp. 173–193. ISBN 978-0-8093-3270-0.
- Smith, Timothy B. (2024). The Inland Campaign for Vicksburg: Five Battles in Seventeen Days, May 1–17, 1863. Lawrence, Kansas: University Press of Kansas. ISBN 978-0-7006-3655-6.
- Symonds, Craig L. (2008). Lincoln and His Admirals. Oxford: Oxford University Press. ISBN 978-0-19-975157-0.
- Winschel, Terrence J. (1998). "Chickasaw Bayou, Mississippi". In Kennedy, Frances H. (ed.). The Civil War Battlefield Guide (2nd ed.). Boston, Massachusetts/New York, New York: Houghton Mifflin. pp. 154–156. ISBN 978-0-395-74012-5.
- Woodworth, Steven E. (2005). Nothing But Victory: The Army of the Tennessee, 1861–1865. New York City: Alfred A. Knopf. ISBN 0-375-41218-2.
