= Michael Kelly Lawler =

United States general

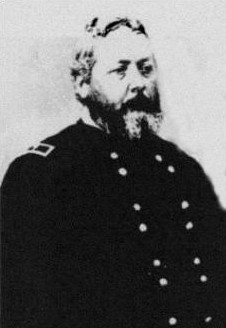
- Michael Kelly Lawler during the American Civil War
- Born: November 16, 1814; Monasterevin, Ireland
- Died: July 22, 1882 (aged 67); Shawneetown, Illinois
- Burial place: Hickory Hill Cemetery, Gallatin County, Illinois
- Military career
- Allegiance: United States of America
- Branch: United States Army; Union Army
- Service years: 1846–1848; 1861–1865
- Rank: Brevet Major General
- Unit: 18th Illinois Volunteer Infantry
- Commands: Lawler's Brigade, XIII Corps, Army of the Tennessee
- Conflicts: Black Hawk War; Mexican–American War; American Civil War; Battle of Fort Donelson; Vicksburg Campaign; Battle of Port Gibson; Battle of Champion Hill; Battle of Big Black River Bridge
- Other work: Farmer, Merchant

Michael Kelly Lawler (November 16, 1814 – July 26, 1882) was a volunteer militia soldier in the Black Hawk War 1831–1832, an officer in the United States Army in both the Mexican–American War and the American Civil War. In the latter conflict, as a brigadier general, he commanded a brigade of infantry in the western theater and served in several battles.

== Early life and career ==
Born in Monasterevin, County Kildare, Ireland, in November 1814, Lawler and his parents, John Lawler and Elizabeth Kelly, moved to the United States four years later and settled initially in Frederick County, Maryland. In 1819, they moved to rural Gallatin County, Illinois. On December 20, 1837, he married Elizabeth Crenshaw. He received an appointment as a captain in the Mexican War and commanded two companies in separate deployments to Mexico. He first led a company from Shawneetown, Illinois, that guarded the supply route from Vera Cruz to General Winfield Scott's Army. After the fall of Vera Cruz, his company was discharged. He made a visit to Washington after which he was asked by Governor Thomas Ford to organize a company of riflemen. He served in the campaign to take Matamoros, Tamaulipas.

He then returned to his farm in Illinois, where he was residing at the outbreak of the Civil War. He established a thriving mercantile business, dealing in hardware, dry goods, and shoes. He studied law, passed his bar exam, and used his legal license to help the claims of Mexican War veterans.

== Civil War service ==
In May 1861, he recruited the 18th Illinois Volunteer Infantry Regiment and was appointed as its first colonel. His time in command of the regiment in Kentucky and Tennessee was controversial and an "ordeal." He suffered a wound during the Battle of Fort Donelson. In November 1862, he was commissioned as a brigadier general and commanded a brigade in the Second Division of the XIII Corps. He fought with distinction in the Vicksburg Campaign in 1863. He led his men in the battles of Port Gibson, Champion's Hill, and Big Black River Bridge, and during the general assault of May 22, 1863 on Vicksburg MS, where troops under his command were the only Union forces to enter the Confederate works at the Railroad Redoubt where they planted the U.S. flag.

Following the surrender of Jackson, Mississippi, the XIII Corps was split up and divided among other operations in the Western Theater. For the rest of the war, General Lawler served as commander of the 1st Division, XIII Corps in Louisiana in the Department of the Gulf, taking command of the division during the disastrous Red River Campaign and leading it on an expedition in June 1864 to secure a crossing of the Atchafalaya River used by Confederate forces.

In the omnibus promotions at the end of the Civil War, Lawler received a promotion for distinguished service to major general in the Union army backdated from March 13, 1865.

== Post-bellum and later career ==
After mustering out of the army in 1866, Lawler returned home and resumed his legal practice and farming near Shawneetown, Illinois.

He died in the summer of 1882 and is buried in the Lawler Family Cemetery near Equality, Illinois, at the rear of the Old Slave House property.

A memorial to Michael K. Lawler stands in Equality, Illinois. He was also honored with a marble bust in Vicksburg National Military Park in Vicksburg, Mississippi.

Chicago named a street after Gen. Michael Lawler, The Civil War hero. Lawler Ave., location: 5034 West, running from 400 to 5500N and from 4300 to 6500 South
