= 49th Indiana Infantry Regiment =

49th Regiment Indiana Infantry
- Active: November 21, 1861 – September 13, 1865
- Country: United States
- Allegiance: Union
- Branch: Infantry
- Engagements: Yazoo Pass Expedition; Battle of Chickasaw Bayou; Battle of Arkansas Post; Battle of Port Gibson; Battle of Champion Hill; Battle of Big Black River Bridge; Siege of Vicksburg, May 19 & May 22 assaults Red River Campaign

The 49th Regiment Indiana Infantry was an infantry regiment that served in the Union Army during the American Civil War.

== Service ==
The 49th Indiana Infantry was organized at Jeffersonville, Indiana and mustered in for a three-year enlistment on November 21, 1861, under the command of Colonel John W. Ray.

The regiment was attached to 12th Brigade, Army of the Ohio, December 1861. 12th Brigade, 1st Division, Army of the Ohio, to March 1862. 24th Brigade, 7th Division, Army of the Ohio, to October 1862. 3rd Brigade, Cumberland Division, District of West Virginia, Department of the Ohio, to November 1862. 2nd Brigade, 9th Division, Right Wing, XIII Corps, Department of the Tennessee, to December 1862. 2nd Brigade, Sherman's Yazoo Expedition, to January 1863. 2nd Brigade, 9th Division, XIII Corps, Army of the Tennessee, to February 1863. 1st Brigade, 9th Division, XIII Corps, to July 1863. 3rd Brigade, 1st Division, XIII Corps, Department of the Tennessee, to August 1863, and Department of the Gulf to March 1864. 2nd Brigade, 1st Division, XIII Corps, to July 1864. 4th Brigade, 1st Division, District of Kentucky, to February 1865. Department of Kentucky to September 1865.

The 49th Indiana Infantry mustered out of service September 13, 1865, at Louisville, Kentucky.

== Detailed service ==
Moved to Bardstown, Kentucky, December 11–13, and duty there until January 12, 1862. March to Cumberland Ford January 12-February 15, 1862. Flat Lick Ford, Cumberland River, February 14. Skirmishes at Big Creek Gap and Jacksborough March 14 (detachment). Reconnaissance toward Cumberland Gap and skirmishes March 21–23. Duty at Cumberland Ford until June. Cumberland Gap Campaign March 28 to June 18. Occupation of Cumberland Gap June 18 to September 16. Tazewell July 22 (detachment). Evacuation of Cumberland Gap and retreat to the Ohio River September 17-October 3. Expedition to Charleston, Virginia, October 21-November 10. Moved to Memphis, Tennessee, November 10, and duty there until December 20. Sherman's Yazoo Expedition December 20, 1862 to January 3, 1863. Chickasaw Bayou December 26–28. Chickasaw Bluff December 29. Expedition to Arkansas Post, Arkansas, January 3–10, 1863. Assault and capture of Fort Hindman, Arkansas Post, January 10–11. Moved to Young's Point, Louisiana, January 15; then to Milliken's Bend March 8. Operations from Milliken's Bend to New Carthage March 31-April 17. James' Plantation, near New Carthage, April 6 and 8. Dunbar's Plantation, Bayou Vidal, April 15. Expedition from Perkins' Plantation to Hard Times Landing April 25–29. Phelps' and Clark's Bayous April 26. Choctaw Bayou on Lake Bruin April 28. Battle of Thompson's Hill, Port Gibson, May 1. Battle of Champion Hill May 16. Big Black River Bridge May 17. Siege of Vicksburg, Mississippi, May 18-July 4. Assaults on Vicksburg May 19 and 22. Advance on Jackson, Mississippi, July 4–10. Near Clinton July 8. Siege of Jackson July 10–17. Ordered to New Orleans, Louisiana, August 13. Duty at Carrollton, Brashear City, and Berwick until October. Western Louisiana "Teche" Campaign October 3-November 30. Moved to New Orleans, then to DeCrow's Point, Texas, December 10–14. Duty at Matagorda Island and Indianola until April 1864. Ordered to New Orleans April 19, then to Alexandria April 23. Red River Campaign April 26-May 22. Action at Graham's Plantation May 5. Retreat to Morganza May 13–20. Expedition to the Atchafalaya May 30-June 6. Duty at Morganza until July. Moved to New Orleans, then home on veteran furlough July and August. Ordered to Lexington, Kentucky, and garrison duty there until September 7, 1865. Moved to Louisville, Kentucky, September 7.

== Casualties ==
The regiment lost a total of 236 men during service; 1 officer and 40 enlisted men killed or mortally wounded, 3 officers and 192 enlisted men died of disease.

== Commanders ==
- Colonel John W. Ray
- Colonel James Keigwin

== Notable members ==
- 1st Sergeant William Wesley Kendall, Company A - Medal of Honor recipient for action at the battle of Big Black River Bridge, May 17, 1863 (he was later promoted to 1st lieutenant)

== See also ==
- List of Indiana Civil War regiments
- Indiana in the Civil War
