= John S. Bowen =

Confederate States Army general

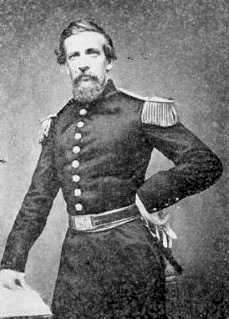
- Bowen in the uniform of a lieutenant colonel of the Missouri Volunteer Militia.
- Born: October 30, 1830; Bowen's Creek, Georgia, U.S.
- Died: July 13, 1863 (aged 32); Edwards, Mississippi
- Burial place: Confederate States Army Cemetery Vicksburg, U.S.
- Military career
- Allegiance: United States of America; State of Missouri; Confederate States
- Branch: United States Army; Missouri Militia; Confederate Army
- Service years: 1853–1856 (USA); 1857–1861 (Missouri); 1861–1863 (CSA)
- Rank: Second lieutenant (USA); Lieutenant colonel (Missouri Volunteer Militia); Major General (CSA)
- Conflicts: American Civil War; Battle of Shiloh; Battle of Grand Gulf; Battle of Port Gibson; Battle of Champion Hill; Battle of Big Black River Bridge; Siege of Vicksburg

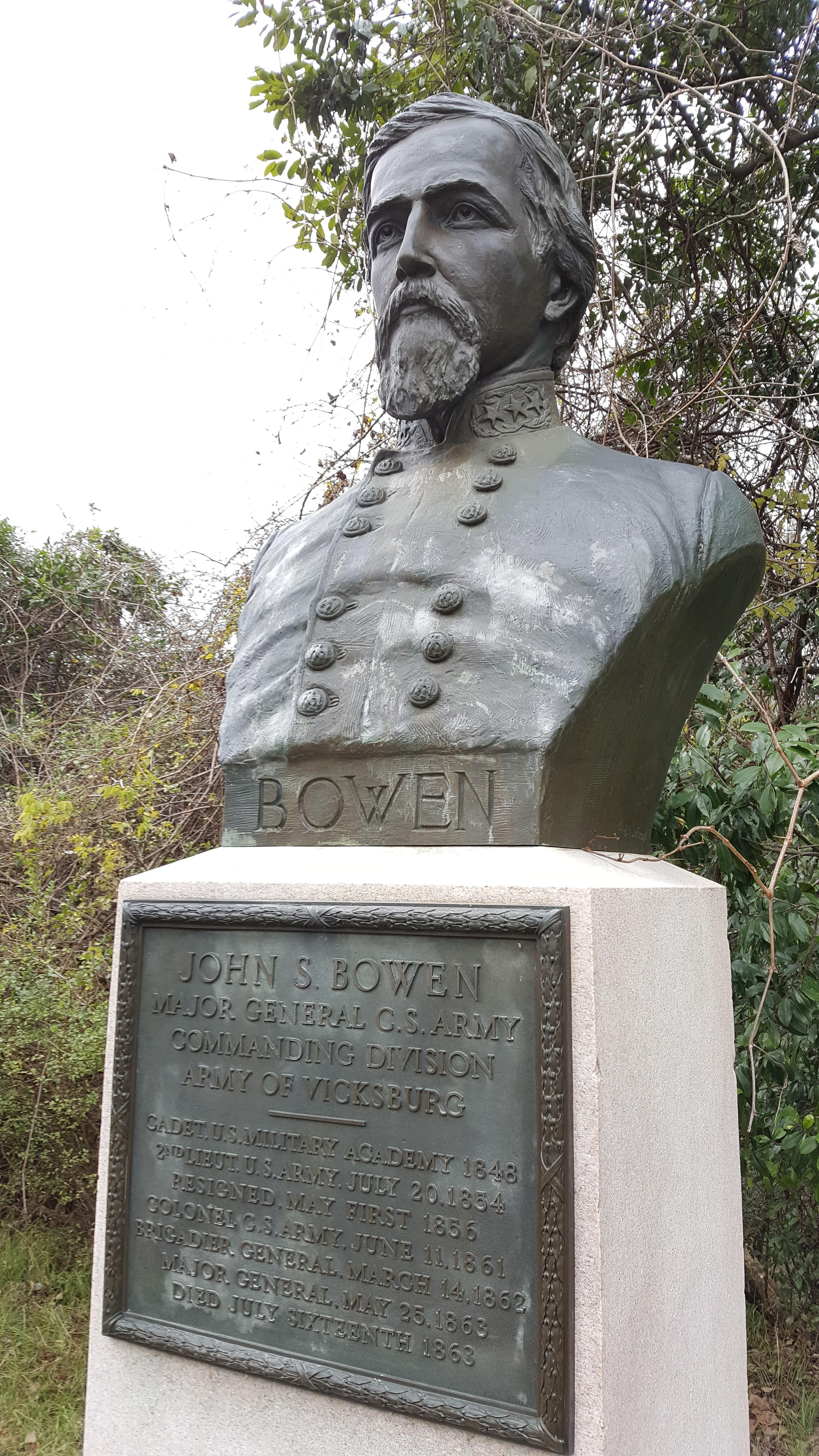
Bust of John S. Bowen by Anton Schaaf at Vicksburg National Military Park, dedicated 1916

John Stevens Bowen (October 30, 1830 – July 13, 1863) was an American career Army officer who later became a general in the Confederate Army and a commander in the Western Theater of the American Civil War. He fought at the battles of Shiloh, Corinth, and the Vicksburg Campaign. He is often said to have died just as his abilities were gaining attention.

== Early life and education ==
Bowen was born in Bowen's Creek, Georgia. He attended the University of Georgia in Athens (UGA) in the early 1840s where he was a member of the Phi Kappa Literary Society, but left before graduating. He later entered the United States Military Academy in 1848, but was suspended in March 1851, for a year. He graduated 13th of 52 cadets in the class of 1853. Among his classmates were future Confederate generals Henry Brevard Davidson, John Bell Hood, and John R. Chambliss, Jr.

He subsequently was commissioned a brevet second lieutenant in the U.S. Regiment of Mounted Rifles. He was first assigned to the army cavalry school at Carlisle, Pennsylvania until 1855, when he was transferred to the Jefferson Barracks in St. Louis, Missouri; while in St. Louis, he met and married Mary Kennerly. He eventually became acting adjutant of the U.S. 2nd Cavalry Regiment; then in early 1855, he was reassigned to Fort McIntosh, Texas. While there, he decided to resign from the army due to loneliness and moved to Georgia, becoming an architect. He designed and built his family's home on Michigan Avenue in St. Louis. Bowen was an acquaintance of Ulysses S. Grant before the war as Grant used to deliver firewood in Bowen's neighborhood. Bowen became a lieutenant colonel in the Georgia militia, but then moved to Missouri in 1857. There he became active in the Missouri Volunteer Militia (MVM). In 1861 he was appointed as lieutenant colonel commanding the MVM's Southwest Battalion, patrolling Missouri's western border against raids by bands of Kansas Jayhawkers.

== Career ==
=== American Civil War ===
In early May 1861, Bowen was ordered to St. Louis, where he took command of the new 2nd Regiment MVM, largely composed of members of the pro-secessionist Minutemen paramilitary organization. While serving as the colonel of the MVM's 2nd Regiment and chief of staff to Brigadier General Daniel M. Frost on May 10, 1861, Bowen was captured at Camp Jackson by Union Army Brigadier General Nathaniel Lyon. As he waited to be exchanged, he was commissioned a colonel in the Confederate States Army on June 11, 1861. After arriving in Memphis, Tennessee he set about recruiting for and organizing the 1st Missouri Infantry. (Note: Bowen's actions in entering CSA service and building and training a CSA regiment were almost certainly a violation of his oath of parole as his activities materially assisted the CSA war effort. After Bowen's capture at Vicksburg, Missouri officers in Federal service protested that Bowen was a parole-breaker, but General Grant allowed Bowen, mortally ill at the time, to be paroled again.) He was reportedly officially exchanged on November 1 and became a brigade commander, serving at Columbus, Kentucky, under Major General Leonidas Polk.

Bowen was promoted to brigadier general on March 14, 1862, and his brigade was assigned to Major General John C. Breckinridge's Reserve Corps of the Army of Mississippi. He distinguished himself in command of his brigade at the Battle of Shiloh, where he was severely wounded by an artillery shell. After his recovery he was given a brigade command in Mansfield Lovell's division of the Army of West Tennessee and took part in the Second Battle of Corinth. On the first day, Bowen's brigade helped overrun the initial Union positions but Lovell refused Bowen's repeated requests to make further attacks. The following day, Bowen advanced his brigade to within sight the Union fortifications but failed to overrun the Union lines due to the artillery fire and to Lovell's orders not to advance any further. During the Confederate retreat from Corinth, his brigade served as part of the rear guard and held off part of the Union army along the Tuscumbia River for an entire day. Once the army reached Ripley, Mississippi, Bowen brought charges against army commander Earl Van Dorn for failing to make a proper reconnaissance of the Union positions before the battle, "marching the troops in a hastily and disorderly manner", failing to attack early on the second day, and neglecting the wounded. The court-martial cleared Van Dorn of all charges.

Van Dorn was relieved of command in December and John C. Pemberton was put in his place commanding the Vicksburg, Mississippi garrison. Bowen was assigned to fortify the post of Grand Gulf with a brigade of infantry. Over the next several weeks, he constructed naval batteries along the river. After becoming convinced that Grant would land near Grand Gulf, he repeatedly requested Pemberton for additional supplies and men but each request was refused. At the Battle of Port Gibson, Bowen, despite being severely outnumbered, managed to delay Ulysses S. Grant's Army of the Tennessee for most of a day and he personally led two counterattacks. For his stand, he was promoted to major general on May 25, 1863, although his nomination was never approved by the Confederate Congress. Despite pleas for reinforcements, Pemberton and General Joseph E. Johnston failed to react quickly and Grant was able to resume his march through Mississippi. After uniting with the rest of Pemberton's army, Bowen was given a division. He next fought at the Battle of Champion Hill, where a counterattack by his division almost split Grant's army in half. When the rest of the army failed to support his attack, Bowen was forced to retreat. After battle Pemberton retreated to Vicksburg and he ordered Bowen to cover the retreat. He suffered defeat at the Battle of Big Black River Bridge on the Big Black River. Accompanying Bowen to Mississippi was his wife, Mary Kennerly Bowen of St. Louis. She refused to be separated from her husband. When Bowen left St. Louis to enter the war, Mary was by his side, leaving their two young children, Menard Kennerly (age 7) and Anna (age 2) at the family home to be cared for by Mary's mother. He took part in the final defense of Vicksburg, helping in the defeat of Union assaults, but grew ill with dysentery during the siege. Early in the siege, Bowen tried to negotiate surrender with Grant, a friend from the antebellum days, but was turned away; he did help ease the negotiations that led to the July 4 surrender. After being paroled, he succumbed to dysentery and died near Edwards, Mississippi.

He was at first buried near where he died in Mississippi but his body was later transferred to the Confederate States Army Cemetery in Vicksburg. Following his death, he was praised by his contemporaries as being one of the best generals of the Western Theater and referred to by one biographer as being the real "Stonewall of the West". Other contemporaries also believed that Bowen, "was not second to any Major General then in the Confederate Service". An attempt after to war to erect a monument to Bowen failed to raise the necessary funds. His bust stands in the Vicksburg National Military Park near Stockade Redan on Graveyard Road with his brigade.

==== Dates of rank ====
- Captain (Missouri State Guard), March 1, 1861
- Lieutenant colonel, April 15, 1861
- Colonel, June 11, 1861
- Brigadier general, March 14, 1862
- Major general, May 25, 1863

== See also ==
- List of American Civil War generals (Confederate)

== Notes ==
Footnotes

Citations
