= List of costliest American Civil War land battles =

This is a list of the costliest land battles of the American Civil War, measured by casualties (killed, wounded, captured, and missing) on both sides. (Note: All strengths and casualties are cited in the named articles. The Siege of Vicksburg (37,532 total casualties), the Battle of Appomattox Court House (28,469), the Siege of Port Hudson (17,500), the Battle of Fort Donelson (16,537), the Battle of Harpers Ferry (12,922), the Battle of Island Number Ten (7,108), and the Battle of Munfordville (4,862) have been omitted from this list because the casualty figures include very high percentages of soldiers surrendered.)

== Highest casualty battles ==
Battle	Campaign	Date	Nearest town	United States	Confederate States of America	Total	Union	Confederacy	United States	Confederate States of America	Total	United States	Confederate States of America	Total
Battle	Campaign	Date	Nearest town	Strength			Commander		Casualties			Casualties as % of strength		
Gettysburg	Gettysburg campaign	July 1–3, 1863	Gettysburg, Pennsylvania	93,921	71,699	165,620	George G. Meade	Robert E. Lee	23,049	28,063	51,112	24.54%	39.14%	30.86%
Chickamauga	Chickamauga campaign	September 19–20, 1863	Fort Oglethorpe, Georgia	60,000	65,000	125,000	William Rosecrans	Braxton Bragg	16,173	18,450	34,624	26.95%	28.38%	27.70%
Spotsylvania Court House	Overland Campaign	May 8–21, 1864	Spotsylvania Courthouse, Virginia	100,000	52,000	152,000	Ulysses S. Grant	Robert E. Lee	18,399	12,687	31,086	18.40%	24.40%	20.45%
Chancellorsville	Chancellorsville campaign	May 1–4, 1863	Chancellorsville, Virginia	133,868	60,298	194,166	Joseph Hooker	Robert E. Lee	17,197	13,303	30,500	12.85%	22.06%	15.71%
The Wilderness	Overland Campaign	May 5–7, 1864	Locust Grove, Virginia	101,895	61,025	162,920	Ulysses S. Grant	Robert E. Lee	17,666	11,033	28,699	17.34%	18.08%	17.62%
Stones River (Murfreesboro)	Stones River campaign	December 31, 1862 – January 2, 1863	Murfreesboro, Tennessee	41,400	35,000	76,400	William Rosecrans	Braxton Bragg	12,906	11,739	24,645	31.17%	33.54%	32.26%
Shiloh (Pittsburg Landing)	Federal penetration up the Cumberland and Tennessee Rivers	April 6–7, 1862	Shiloh, Tennessee	66,812	44,699	111,511	Ulysses S. Grant	Albert Sidney Johnston	13,047	10,699	23,746	19.53%	23.94%	21.29%
Antietam (Sharpsburg)	Maryland campaign	September 17, 1862	Sharpsburg, Maryland	75,500	38,000	113,500	George B. McClellan	Robert E. Lee	12,401	10,316	22,717	16.43%	27.15%	20.01%
2nd Bull Run (2nd Manassas)	Northern Virginia campaign	August 29–30, 1862	Manassas, Virginia	62,000	50,000	112,000	John Pope	Robert E. Lee	10,000	8,300	18,300	16.13%	16.60%	16.34%
Fredericksburg	Fredericksburg campaign	December 11–15, 1862	Fredericksburg, Virginia	114,000	72,500	186,500	Ambrose Burnside	Robert E. Lee	12,653	5,377	18,030	11.10%	7.42%	9.67%
Cold Harbor	Overland Campaign	May 31 – June 12, 1864	Mechanicsville, Virginia	108,000	59,000	167,000	Ulysses S. Grant	Robert E. Lee	12,737	4,595	17,332	11.79%	7.79%	10.38%
2nd Petersburg	Richmond–Petersburg campaign	June 15–18, 1864	Petersburg, Virginia	62,000	38,000	100,000	Ulysses S. Grant	Robert E. Lee	11,386	4,000	15,386	18.36%	10.53%	15.39%
Gaines's Mill	Peninsula campaign	June 27, 1862	Mechanicsville, Virginia	34,214	57,018	91,232	George B. McClellan	Robert E. Lee	6,837	7,993	14,830	19.98%	14.02%	16.26%
Missionary Ridge	Chattanooga campaign	November 25, 1863	Chattanooga, Tennessee	56,359	44,010	100,369	Ulysses S. Grant	Braxton Bragg	5,824	6,667	12,491	10.33%	15.15%	12.45%
Atlanta	Atlanta campaign	July 22, 1864	Atlanta, Georgia	34,863	40,438	75,301	William T. Sherman	John Bell Hood	3,641	8,499	12,140	10.44%	21.02%	16.12%
Seven Pines (Fair Oaks)	Peninsula campaign	May 31 – June 1, 1862	Mechanicsville, Virginia	34,000	39,000	73,000	George B. McClellan	Joseph E. Johnston	5,031	6,134	11,165	14.80%	15.73%	15.29%
Nashville	Franklin–Nashville campaign	December 15–16, 1864	Nashville, Tennessee	55,000	30,000	85,000	George H. Thomas	John Bell Hood	3,061	6,000	9,061	5.57%	20.00%	10.66%
Opequon (3rd Winchester)	Sheridan's Valley campaign	September 19, 1864	Winchester, Virginia	40,000	15,514	55,514	Philip Sheridan	Jubal Early	5,020	4,015	9,035	12.55%	25.88%	16.28%
Cedar Creek	Sheridan's Valley campaign	October 19, 1864	Middletown, Virginia	31,610	21,102	52,712	Philip Sheridan	Jubal Early	5,764	2,910	8,674	18.23%	13.79%	16.46%
Franklin	Franklin–Nashville campaign	November 30, 1864	Franklin, Tennessee	27,000	27,000	54,000	John M. Schofield	John Bell Hood	2,326	6,252	8,578	8.61%	23.16%	15.89%
Malvern Hill	Peninsula campaign	July 1, 1862	Varina, Virginia	54,000	55,000	109,000	George B. McClellan	Robert E. Lee	2,100	5,650	7,750	3.89%	10.27%	7.11%
3rd Petersburg	Richmond-Petersburg campaign	April 2, 1865	Petersburg, Virginia	76,113	58,400	134,513	Ulysses S. Grant	Robert E. Lee	3,500	4,250	7,750	4.60%	7.28%	5.76%
Perryville	Kentucky campaign	October 8, 1862	Perryville, Kentucky	22,000	16,000	38,000	Don Carlos Buell	Braxton Bragg	4,276	3,401	7,677	19.44%	21.26%	20.20%
Glendale	Peninsula campaign	June 30, 1862	Varina, Virginia	40,000	45,000	85,000	George B. McClellan	Robert E. Lee	3,797	3,673	7,470	9.49%	8.16%	8.79%
2nd Corinth	Iuka and Corinth Operations	October 3–4, 1862	Corinth, Mississippi	23,000	22,000	45,000	William S. Rosecrans	Earl Van Dorn	2,520	4,233	6,753	10.96%	19.24%	15.01%
Peachtree Creek	Atlanta campaign	July 20, 1864	Atlanta, Georgia	21,655	20,250	41,905	George H. Thomas	John Bell Hood	1,710	4,796	6,506	7.90%	23.68%	15.53%
Champion Hill	Vicksburg campaign	May 16, 1863	Edwards, Mississippi	32,000	22,000	54,000	Ulysses S. Grant	John C. Pemberton	2,457	3,840	6,297	7.68%	17.45%	11.66%
The Crater	Richmond-Petersburg campaign	July 30, 1864	Petersburg, Virginia	8,500	6,100	14,600	Ulysses S. Grant	Robert E. Lee	3,798	1,491	5,289	44.68%	24.44%	36.23%
Fort Stedman	Richmond-Petersburg campaign	March 25, 1865	Petersburg, Virginia	14,898	10,000	24,898	John G. Parke	John B. Gordon	1,044	4,000	5,044	7.01%	40.00%	20.26%
South Mountain	Maryland campaign	September 14, 1862	Boonsboro, Maryland	28,000	18,000	46,000	George B. McClellan	Robert E. Lee	2,325	2,685	5,010	8.30%	14.92%	10.89%
1st Bull Run (1st Manassas)	Manassas campaign	July 21, 1861	Manassas, Virginia	35,000	34,000	69,000	Irvin McDowell	P. G. T. Beauregard	2,896	1,982	4,878	8.27%	5.83%	7.07%

== See also ==
- List of American Civil War battles
- Timeline of events leading to the American Civil War
- Bibliography of the American Civil War
- Bibliography of Ulysses S. Grant
