= Samuel Henry Lockett =

Virginian army officer and university professor (1837–1891)

Samuel H. Lockett
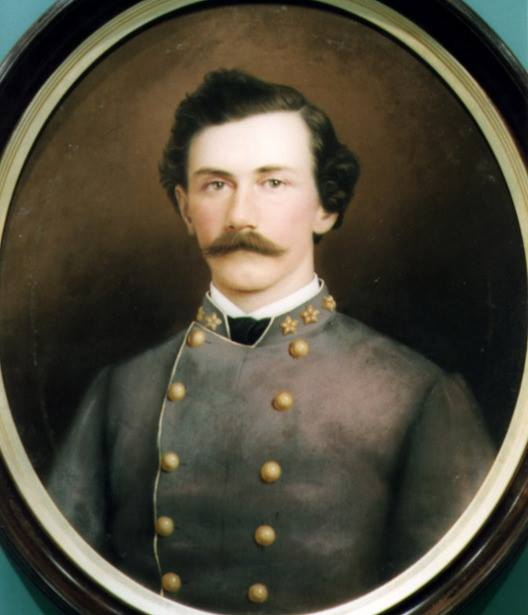
- Born: July 7, 1837; Mecklenburg County, Virginia, US
- Died: October 12, 1891 (aged 54); Bogotá, Colombia
- Military career
- Allegiance: United States; Confederate States; Khedivate of Egypt
- Branch: United States Army; Confederate States Army; Egyptian Army
- Rank: Bvt. Second Lieutenant (USA); Colonel (CSA); Colonel (Egyptian Army)
- Battles: American Civil War

Samuel Henry Lockett (July 7, 1837 – October 12, 1891) was a Virginian engineering officer in the armies of the United States, Confederate States, and Egypt. He was also a professor at Louisiana State University and the University of Tennessee at Knoxville, as well as an amateur artist.

== Life ==
Samuel Henry Lockett was born on July 7, 1837, in Mecklenburg County Virginia.

=== Military career ===
He was a Cadet at the Military Academy, at West Point, New York, from July 1, 1854, to July 1, 1859, when he was graduated and promoted in the Army to Brevet Second Lieutenant, Corps of Engineers, on July 1, 1859.

He served, at the Military Academy, from 1859 to 1861, as assistant instructor in the use of small arms, from November 19, 1858, to September 4, 1860—and as assistant professor of Spanish, from September 2, 1859, to September 4, 1860; and as assistant engineer in the construction of Forts Pulaski and Jackson, Savannah River, Georgia, between 1860 and 1861.

He resigned his commission in the U.S. Army on February 1, 1861. He joined the forces of the Confederacy and fought in the Civil War of 1861 to 1865 against the United States.

==== Vicksburg ====
The engineering effort during the Vicksburg campaign came under the general authority of chief engineer Major Samuel H. Lockett, who arrived at Vicksburg in June 1862. At that time, Vicksburg's only fortifications consisted of a few batteries along the river. Union naval bombardments on 27–28 July 1862 persuaded the Confederate command to fortify the city on both the landward and riverfronts. Lockett spent the month of August surveying the rough terrain and planning on how best to utilize it for defensive purposes. On 1 September 1862, the actual construction began, using hired or impressed slave labor. Lockett's fortified line extended nine miles, from the river above Vicksburg to the river below. Thirteen river batteries studded the bluffs overlooking the Mississippi. Snyder's (Haynes') Bluff to the north and Warrenton to the south were also fortified. In addition, the Confederates also constructed a set of floating barriers called "rafts" across the Yazoo River to block incursions by Union gunboats.

When John C. Pemberton assumed command of the department on 1 November 1862, Lockett's responsibilities increased. He exercised authority over the entire area from Holly Springs to Port Hudson and from Vicksburg to Jackson. As part of his duties, Lockett surveyed defensive positions around Jackson and Edwards Station. In May 1863, after Grant had crossed the river, Lockett laid out defensive bridgeheads at several crossing sites along the Big Black River.

As the campaign unfolded, Lockett continued to support the Confederate army, often on his own initiative. It was Lockett who found and repaired the washed-out bridge over Baker's Creek that gave Pemberton a withdrawal route after the Battle of Champion Hill on 16 May. Lockett later prepared the railroad bridge over the Big Black for demolition and fired it on 17 May just before the Federals reached it after their destruction of the Confederate bridgehead. Following that disastrous engagement, Lockett rushed back to Vicksburg to supervise the repair of fortifications damaged by the winter rains. Once the siege began, Lockett was busy supervising the repair of fortifications damaged by Union artillery. When the Federals began mining efforts, Lockett responded with at least fifteen countermines, three of which he exploded.

Lockett operated with even fewer engineer assets than the meager number available to Grant. Although Lockett and his three-man staff equaled the number of engineers assigned to Grant's staff, and although he did have four other trained engineers as assistants, his troop assets included only one company of sappers and miners that numbered less than three dozen men. Most of the entrenching work had been done by a relatively small number of hired or impressed slave laborers. Apparently, Confederate infantrymen were less willing than their Union counterparts to dig and maintain earthworks. When Lockett reached Vicksburg on 18 May, he had only twenty-six sappers and miners, eight detailed mechanics, four overseers, and seventy-two slaves (twenty of whom were sick) to quickly repair nine miles of fortified lines. Lockett noted having only 500 shovels available.

Although the Confederate army at Vicksburg was obviously blessed with an engineer staff officer of talent and initiative, not all of Lockett's countrymen appreciated his efforts. General Joseph E. Johnston, when he toured the works around Vicksburg in December 1862, felt that "[the usual error of Confederate engineering had been committed there. An immense, entrenched camp, requiring an army to hold it, had been made instead of a fort requiring only a small garrison." This defect, however, was not Lockett's fault. He received little command guidance; therefore, he planned his defenses to suit the best engineering aspects of the terrain.

After the war, Lockett served as a Colonel of Engineers in the Egyptian Army, from July 17, 1875, to August 31, 1877.

=== Civil career ===
He was Principal Assistant Engineer in the construction of the pedestal of the Bartholdi Statue of Liberty, New York harbor, from June 1883 to October 1884. He was involved in the construction of water and gas works in various cities in the United States to 1888, and was engaged in engineering and railroad work in South America (Chile and Colombia), from 1888 to 1891.

He died on October 12, 1891, at Bogotá, Colombia, aged 54.

== Likenesses ==
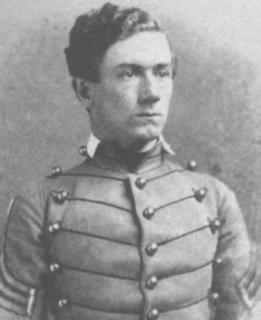
Samuel Henry Lockett

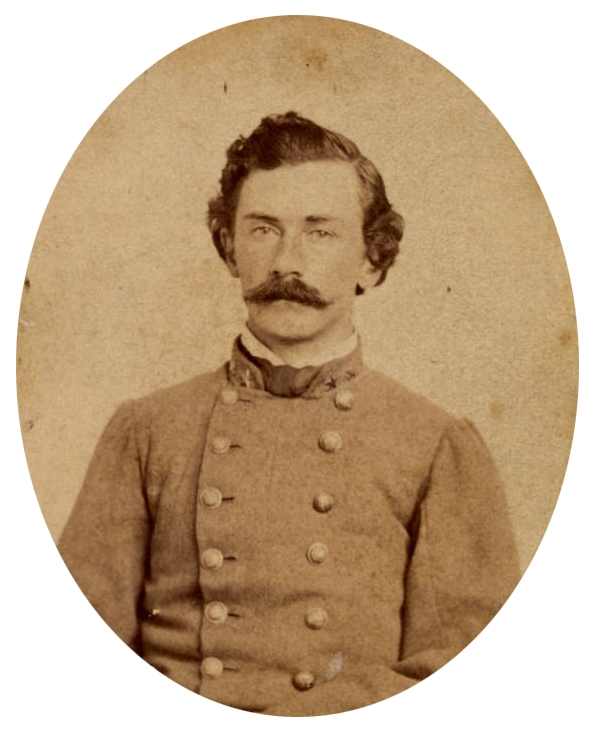
Lieutenant Colonel Samuel Henry Lockett, CSA

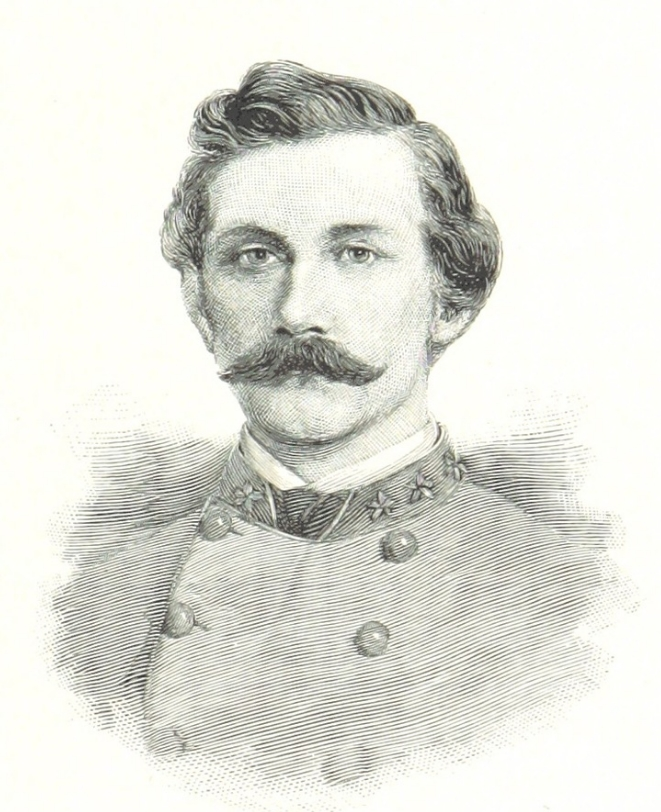
Colonel Samuel Henry Lockett, CSA

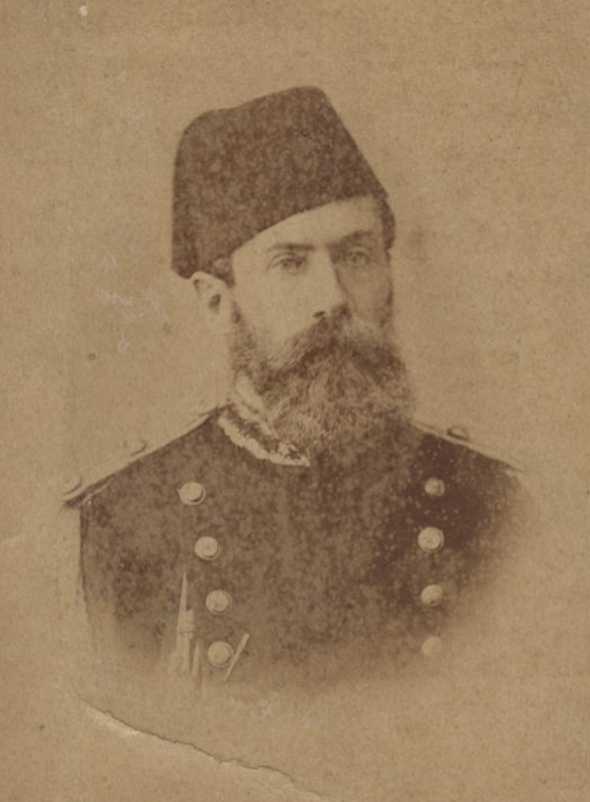
Colonel Samuel H. Lockett, Egyptian Army

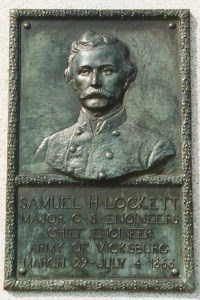
Bronze relief portrait of Major Samuel Lockett, erected March 1, 1910

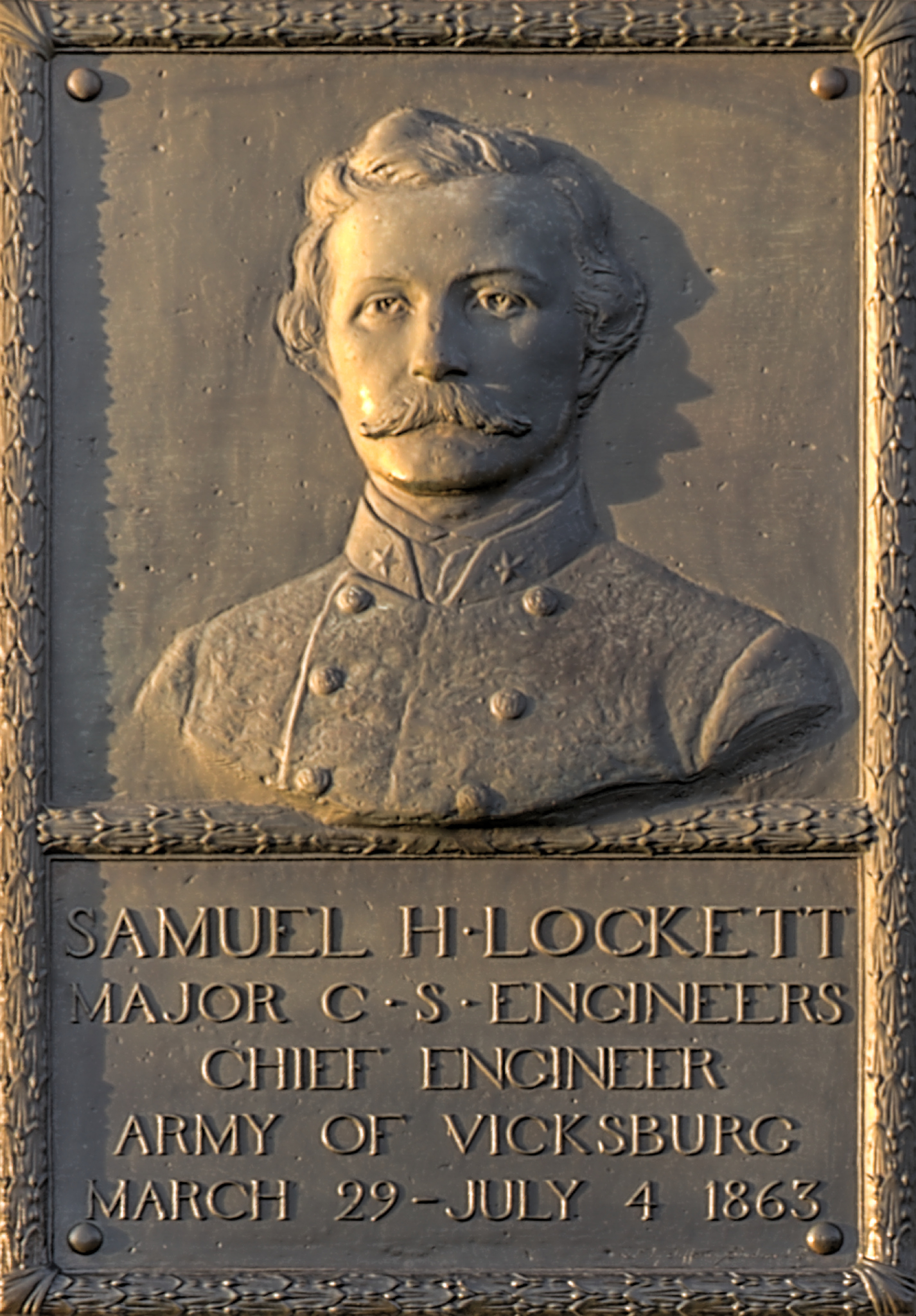
Bronze relief portrait of Maj. Samuel Lockett at Vicksburg National Military Park

== Paintings ==
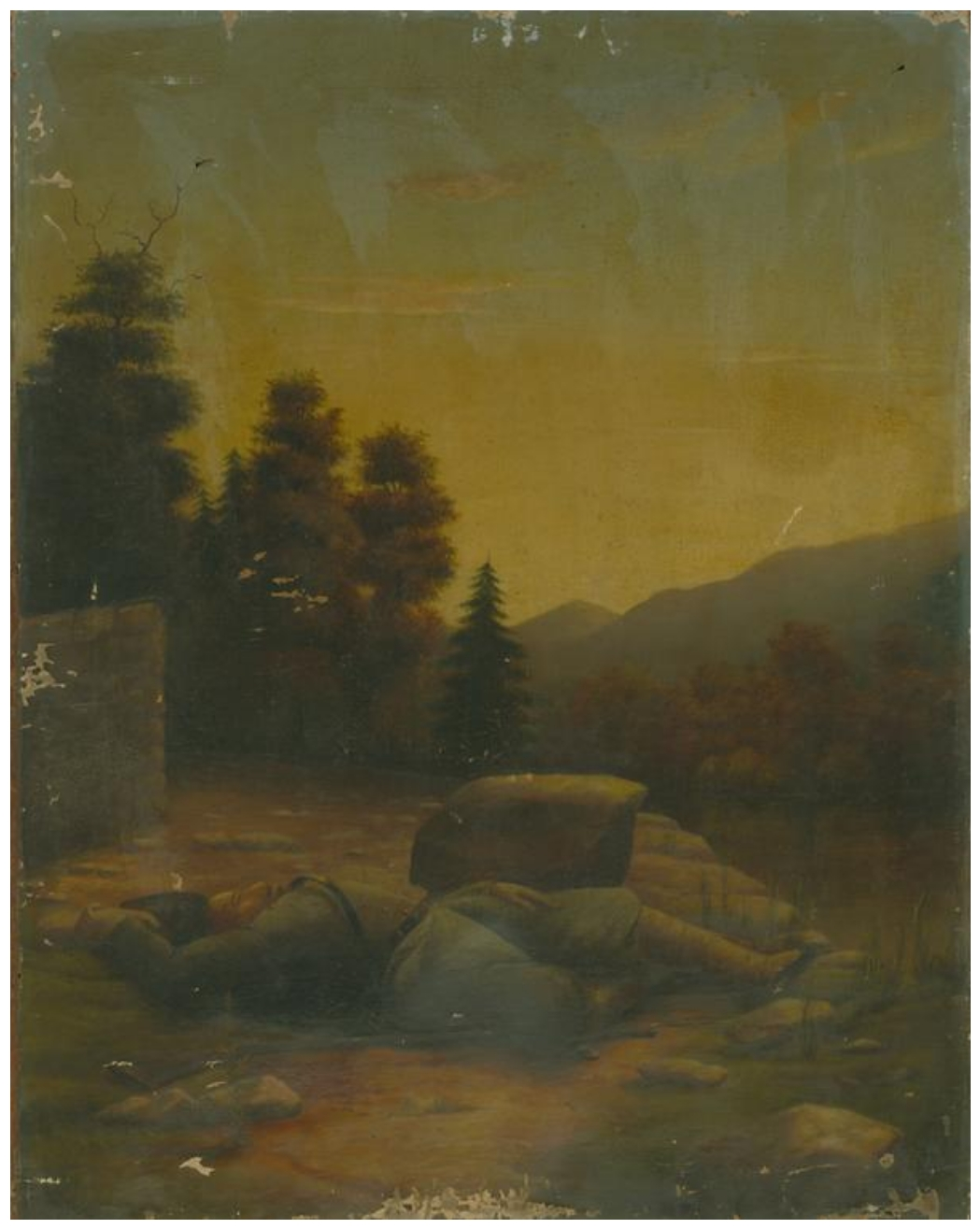
Confederate soldier lying dead on the ground with his right arm over his head and a rifle with a bayonet resting beside his body, 1863

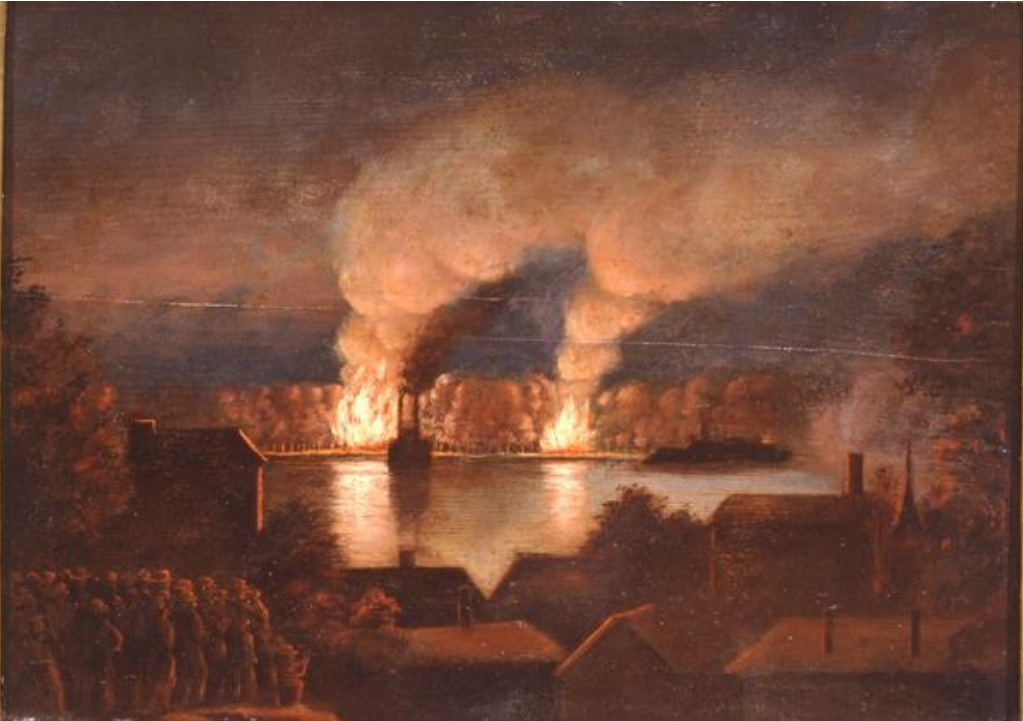
Night Passage of Union Boats at Vicksburg on the Mississippi, 1863

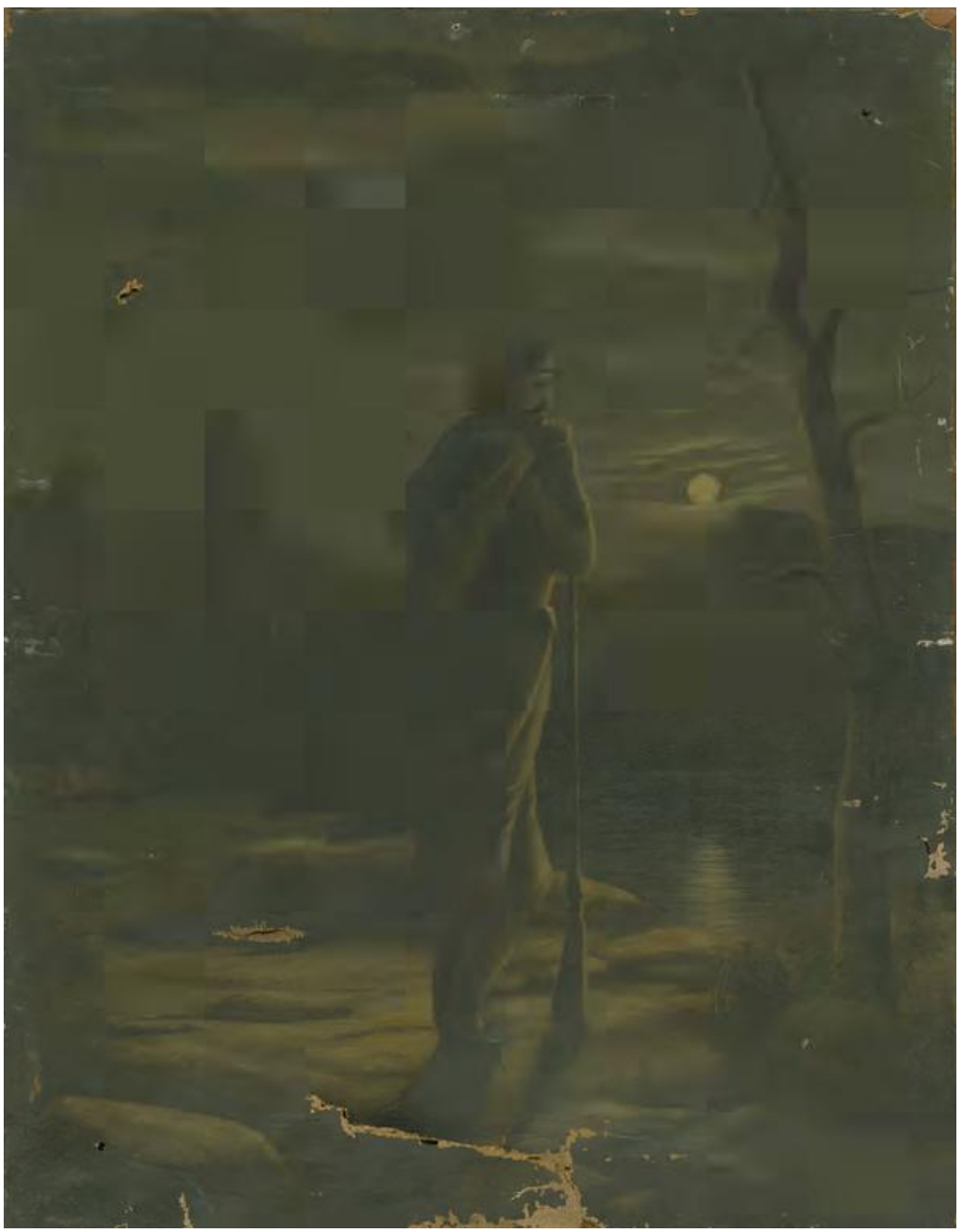
Confederate soldier leaning on the barrel of a gun, gazing over a moonlit lake, 1863

== Sources ==
- Cullum, George W. (1879). Biographical Register of the Officers and Graduates of the U.S. Military Academy, at West Point, N.Y. 2nd ed. Vol. 2. New York, NY: James Miller. p. 481.
- Cullum, George W. (1901). Holden, Edward S. (ed.). Biographical Register of the Officers and Graduates of the U.S. Military Academy, at West Point, N.Y. Supplement, Vol. 4. Cambridge, MA: The Riverside Press. p. 113.
- Gabel, Christopher R., Staff ride handbook for the Vicksburg Campaign, December 1862-July 1863. Fort Leavenworth, Kan.: Combat Studies Institute Press, 2001. OCLC 47296103.
- "Samuel Henry Lockett Papers, 1820–1972 (Collection Number: 00432)". University of North Carolina (UNC). Retrieved April 4, 2023.
