= 18th Illinois Infantry Regiment =

18th Regiment Illinois Volunteer Infantry
- Illinois state flag
- Active: May 28, 1861, to December 31, 1865
- Country: United States
- Allegiance: Union
- Branch: Infantry
- Engagements: Fort Henry; Fort Donelson; Battle of Shiloh; Siege of Vicksburg

Approved Pension Application File for Henry Fernando Hodges, Minor Child of Sebastian S Hodges, Company C, 18th Illinois Infantry Regiment

The 18th Regiment Illinois Volunteer Infantry was an infantry regiment that served in the Union Army during the American Civil War.

== Service ==
Organized at Aurora, Ill., and mustered into State service May 19, and into U. S. service May 28, 1861. Moved to Bird's Point, Mo., June 24, and duty there till August 26. Moved to Mound City August 26, and duty there till October 5. Moved to Cairo, Ill., October 5, and duty there till February, 1862. Attached to District of Cairo, to October, 1861. 1st Brigade, District of Cairo, to February, 1862. 1st Brigade, 1st Division, District of Cairo, February, 1862. 2nd Brigade, 1st Division, District of West Tenn., March, 1862. 1st Brigade, 1st Division, 1st District, West Tenn., and Army of the Tennessee, to July, 1862. 1st Brigade, 1st Division, District of Jackson, Tenn., to September, 1862. 2nd Brigade, 1st Division, District of Jackson, to November, 1862. District of Jackson, 13th Army Corps (Old), Dept. of the Tennessee, to December, 1862. 1st Brigade, District of Jackson, 16th Army Corps, to March, 1868. 2nd Brigade, 3rd Division, 16th Army Corps, to May, 1863. 2nd Brigade, Kimball's Provisional Division, 16th Army Corps, to July, 1863. 2nd Brigade, Kimball's Provisional Division, District of Eastern Ark., to August, 1863. 1st Brigade, 2nd Division, Arkansas Expedition, to November, 1863. 3rd Brigade, 2nd Division, Arkansas Expedition, to January, 1864. 3rd Brigade, 2nd Division, 7th Army Corps, Dept. of Arkansas, to April, 1864. Post Pine Bluff, Ark., 7th Army Corps, to May, 1864. 1st Brigade, 2nd Division, 7th Army Corps, to January, 1865. Pontoneers, 7th Army Corps, to May, 1865. 1st Brigade, 1st Division, 7th Army Corps, to August, 1865. Dept. of Arkansas, to December, 1865.

== Detailed History ==
This regiment originally rendezvoused at Anna, Union County, May 16, 1861, for the 9th Congressional District, under the "Ten Regiment Bill." On May 19 it was mustered into the state service for 30 days, by Ulysses S. Grant, then state mustering officer, and was on the 28th of the same month mustered into the U. S. service for three years. On June 24 it was moved to Bird's Point, Mo., where it remained, drilling, doing guard duty, working on fortifications, removing railroad buildings and track to keep the same from falling into the river, making new roads, etc., until Aug. 5, when it was moved into the swamp 8 miles west on the line of the Chicago & Fulton Railroad to guard it and protect workmen making repairs. On November 3 it formed part of a force which was sent to Bloomfield, Mo., to rout Jeff. Thompson and his band, which was accomplished. On February 6, 1862, it was in the advance in Gen. Oglesby's brigade at the capture of Fort Henry and was one of the first to enter the fort, but too late to meet the Confederates, who had flown. At Fort Donelson it occupied the right of Oglesby's brigade, on the right of the line of battle, and during the second day's fight lost 200 men in killed and wounded. 50 dying upon the field and 10 soon afterward. The regiment during the battle bravely and persistently maintained the position to which it was assigned in the early morning, and not until its ammunition was spent was the order to retire given. Its place that eventful morning was one commanding the road from the fort by which the Confederates essayed to escape, which daring attempt, however, was most signally frustrated by Oglesby's dauntless brigade. The regiment became early engaged in the battle of Shiloh, where the fight was fast became early engaged in the battle of Shiloh, where the fight was fast and furious. At the commencement of the battle the regiment had for duty 435 officers and men. The loss on the 6th was 10 killed, 63 wounded and 2 missing, but none were injured on the second day. The 3 color bearers who carried the flag in the first day's conflict were all killed while supporting the banner. The regiment was with the Army of the Tennessee during the advance upon Corinth, serving in a brigade commanded by Col. Lawler, in McClernand's division. On November 28, 1862, one-half the period for which the regiment was mustered into service having expired, a statement was made showing that the original strength of officers and men, with the addition of new recruits, aggregated 1,166, and the regiment had lost through all causes 456, leaving a total aggregate on the rolls of 710. On December 20 the regiment, with other forces, was marched out towards Lexington and Trenton to intercept the Confederates in a raid then being made against Union troops guarding the railroads, etc., and on Dec. 31 Cos. E and H were engaged in a fight with the Confederates under Forrest near Lexington, driving the enemy with considerable loss. On April 1, 1863, the regiment (250 mounted men) was moved toward Bolivar, Whiteville and beyond on the hunt of guerrillas and other Confederates said to be infesting the neighborhood, and a brush was had with a party posted in the road, the enemy being driven towards Danceyville, the regiment capturing some prisoners and horses. On April 11 it was ordered to Summerville, Tenn., where it investigated the place and surrounding country, routing guerrillas and securing a few prisoners. On June 4 the aggregate of the regiment, rank and file, was 369 on hand for duty, not including the teamsters, men in hospital and those absent on other service, but on July 27 the aggregate strength of those present and absent was 553, many of them being sick in hospital. On August 31 the regiment was mustered and found to be so much reduced by sickness that less than 200 remained for duty, but on Sept. 11 those who were able advanced with the forces toward Little Rock, Ark., driving the enemy on both sides of the river and taking possession of the intrenchments and the city the same day. Soon after May 28, 1864, when the term of service of those originally mustered in expired, they were mustered out and the veterans and recruits were retained in the service until Dec. 16, 1865.

== Total strength and casualties ==
The regiment suffered 6 officers and 99 enlisted men who were killed in action or who died of their wounds and 7 officers and 282 enlisted men who died of disease, for a total of 394 fatalities.

== Commanders ==
- Colonel Michael K. Lawler - promoted to brigadier general on April 14, 1863.
- Colonel Daniel H. Brush - resigned August 21, 1863.
- Lieutenant Colonel Samuel B Marks - resigned 1864

== See also ==
- List of Illinois Civil War Units
- Illinois in the American Civil War
