= Meander scar =

Geological feature

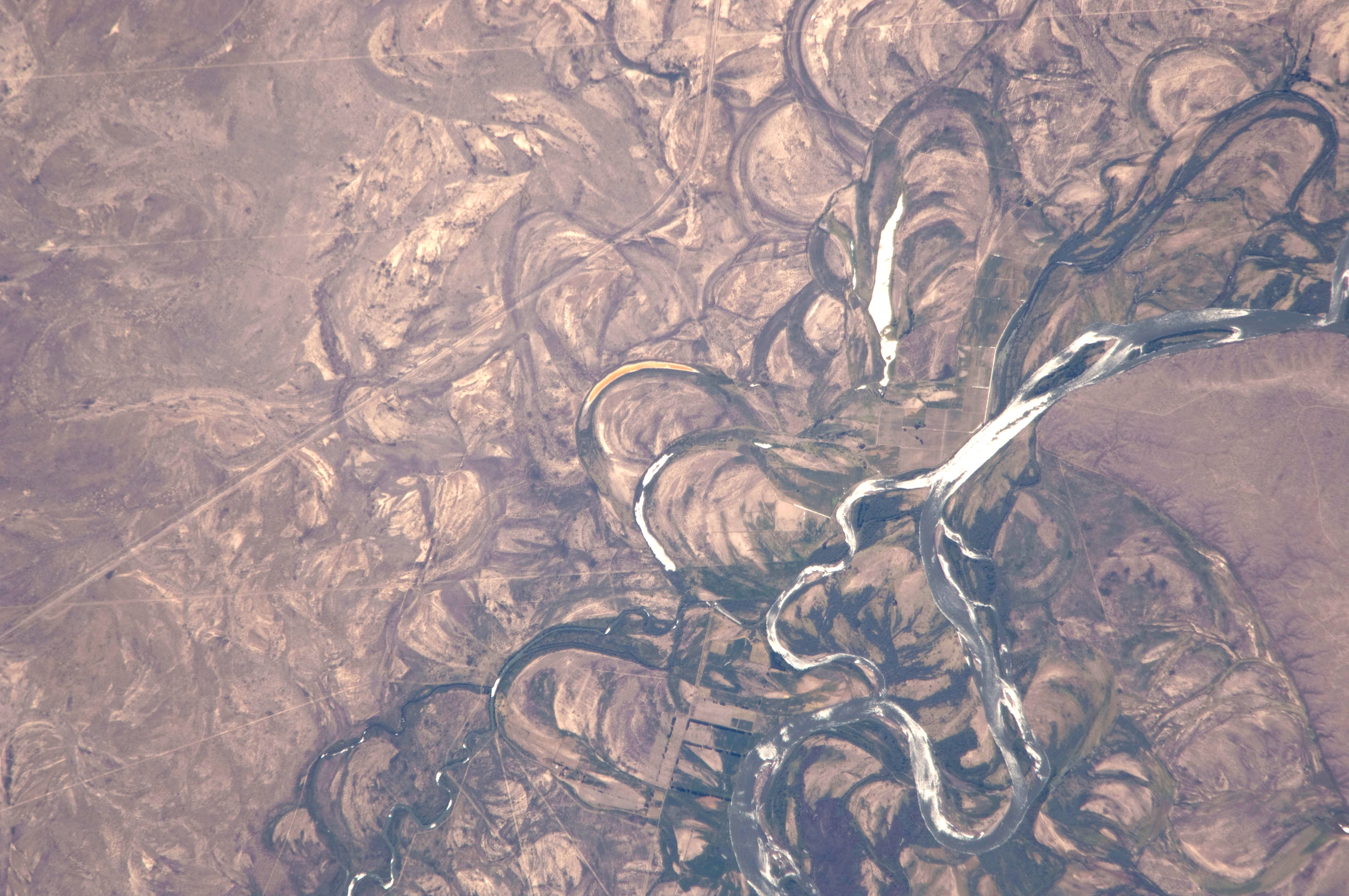
Meander scars, oxbow lakes and abandoned meanders in the broad flood plain of the Rio Negro, Argentina. 2010 astronaut photo from ISS.

A meander scar, occasionally meander scarp, is a geological feature formed by the remnants of a meandering water channel. They are characterized by "a crescentic cut in a bluff or valley wall, produced by...a meandering stream." They are often formed during the creation of oxbow lakes.

The term itself may refer alternatively to the actual cuts into the bank of a bluff, or to the general feature of a drying or dried meander. Both uses, however, describe features of the same process.

Meander scars are caused by the varying velocities of current within the river channel. Due to higher velocity current on the outer banks of the river through the bend, more erosion occurs causing the characteristic steep outer slopes. In certain habitats, if the scar has sufficient water, or as an oxbow lake fills with sediment, these areas may become marshes or wetlands.
