= Battle of Champion Hill =

Battle in the American Civil War

- Part of the American Civil War
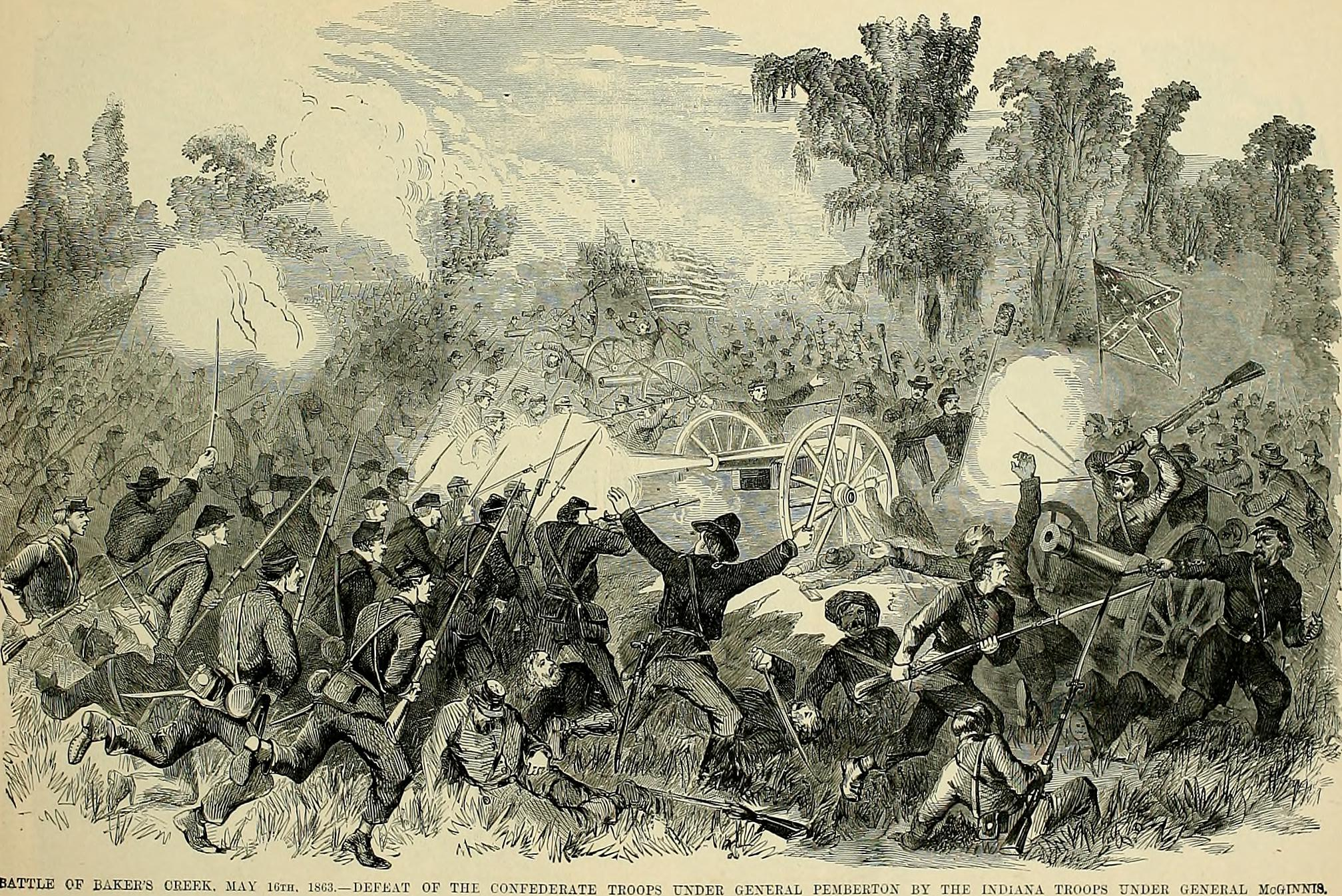
| Date | May 16, 1863 |
| Location | Hinds County, Mississippi |
| Result | Union victory |

Belligerents
| United States (Union) | CSA (Confederacy) |

Commanders and leaders
| (United States) Ulysses S. Grant | (Confederate States of America) John C. Pemberton |

Units involved
| Army of the Tennessee | Department of Mississippi and East Louisiana |

Strength
| 32,000 | 22,000 |

Casualties and losses
| 2,457 total (410 killed, 1,844 wounded, 187 missing) | 3,840 total (381 killed, 1,018 wounded, 2,441 missing/captured) |

The Battle of Champion Hill, also known as the Battle of Champion's Hill and the Battle of Baker's Creek, of May 16, 1863, was the pivotal battle in the Vicksburg campaign of the American Civil War (1861–1865). Union Army commander Major General Ulysses S. Grant and the Army of the Tennessee pursued the retreating Confederate States Army under Lieutenant General John C. Pemberton and defeated it twenty miles to the east of Vicksburg, Mississippi, leading inevitably to the Siege of Vicksburg and surrender.

Sidney S. Champion, born in Guilford County, North Carolina, in 1824, came to Mississippi and settled on a large tract of land located between Bolton and Edwards. Captain Champion was a seasoned Confederate soldier long before the outbreak of the Battle of Champion Hill. The night of May 15 found Captain Champion within range of the battle site and serving as a vital member of General Pemberton's staff.

== Background ==
Following the Union occupation of Jackson, Mississippi, on May 14, both Confederate and Union forces made plans for future operations. General Joseph E. Johnston, commanding all Confederate forces in Mississippi, retreated with most of his army up the Canton Road. However, he ordered Lieutenant General John C. Pemberton, commanding three divisions totaling about 23,000 men, to leave Edwards Station and attack the Union troops at Clinton. Pemberton and his generals felt that Johnston's plan was likely to result in disaster and decided instead to attack the Union supply trains moving from Grand Gulf to Raymond. On May 16, however, Pemberton received another message from Johnston repeating his former orders. Pemberton had already started after the supply trains and was on the Raymond-Edwards Road, with his rear at a crossroads one-third mile south of the crest of Champion Hill. When he obediently ordered a countermarch, his rear, including his supply wagons, had become the vanguard of his attack.

== Opposing forces ==
Army commanders at Champion Hill
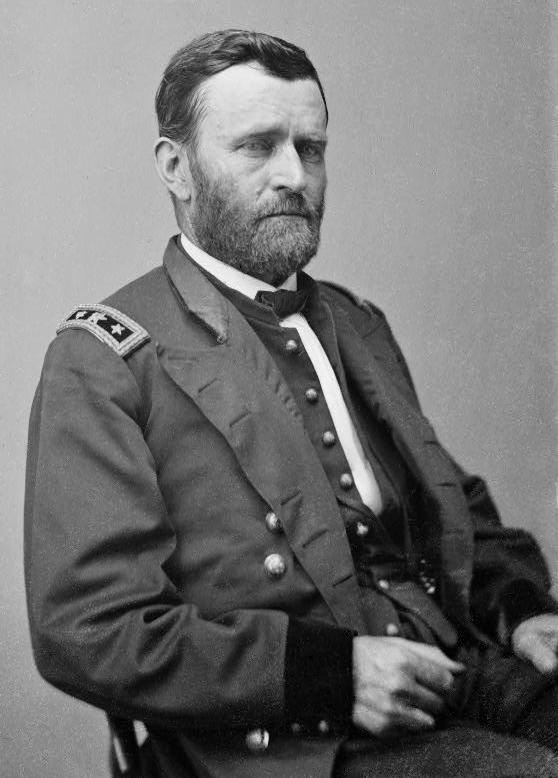
Maj. Gen.
Ulysses S. Grant, Army of the Tennessee

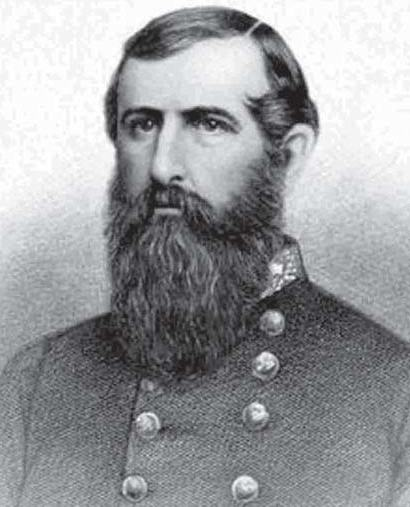
Lt. Gen. John C. Pemberton, Department of Mississippi and East Louisiana

== Battle ==
At around 7:00 am on May 16, Union forces engaged the Confederates and the Battle of Champion Hill began. Pemberton's force formed into a three-mile (5 km)-long defensive line that ran southwest to northeast along a crest of a ridge overlooking Jackson Creek. Grant wrote in his Personal Memoirs, "... where Pemberton had chosen his position to receive us, whether taken by accident or design, was well selected. It is one of the highest points in that section, and commanded all the ground in the range."

Pemberton was unaware that one of the three Union columns was moving along the Jackson Road against his unprotected left flank on Champion Hill. Pemberton posted Brigadier General Stephen D. Lee's Alabama brigade on Champion Hill where they could watch for a Union column reportedly moving on the crossroads. Lee soon spotted the Union troops and they in turn saw him. If the enemy force was not stopped, it would cut the Confederates off from their Vicksburg base. Pemberton was warned of the Union movement and sent troops to defend his left flank. Union forces at the Champion House moved into action and their artillery began firing.

When Grant arrived at Champion Hill at about 10:00 a.m., he ordered an attack to begin. John A. McClernand's corps weakly attacked on the left and James B. McPherson's aggressively on the right. William T. Sherman's corps was well behind the others, departing from Jackson. By 11:30 a.m., the Union forces had reached the Confederate's main line. At 1:00 p.m., they took the crest, the troops from Carter L. Stevenson's division retiring in disorder. McPherson's corps swept forward, capturing the crossroads and closing the Jackson Road escape route. The division of John S. Bowen counterattacked in support of Stevenson, pushing the Union troops back beyond the Champion Hill crest before their surge was halted. However, they were too few to hold the position. Pemberton directed William W. Loring to send forces from the southern area of the line, where they were only lightly engaged with McClernand's ineffective attack, to reinforce the hill. However, Loring refused to budge, citing a strong Union presence to his front.

Grant now counterattacked, committing his forces that had just arrived from Clinton by way of Bolton. Pemberton's men could not resist this assault, and he ordered them to use the one escape route still open, the Raymond Road crossing of Bakers Creek. By now, Loring had decided to obey Pemberton's order and was marching toward the fighting by a circuitous route that kept them out of action. Brigadier General Lloyd Tilghman's brigade formed the rearguard and held at all costs, including the death of Tilghman, killed by artillery fire. Late in the afternoon, Grant's troops seized the Bakers Creek Bridge, and by midnight they had occupied Edwards. The Confederates fell back to a defensive position at the Big Black River in front of Vicksburg. The Battle of Big Black River Bridge the next day would be the final chance for Pemberton to escape.

Grant's operations against Vicksburg

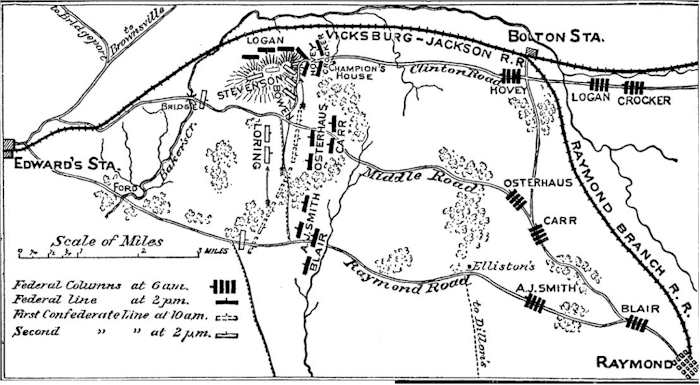
Map from Campaigns of the Civil War: The Mississippi, by Francis Vinton Greene, 1882

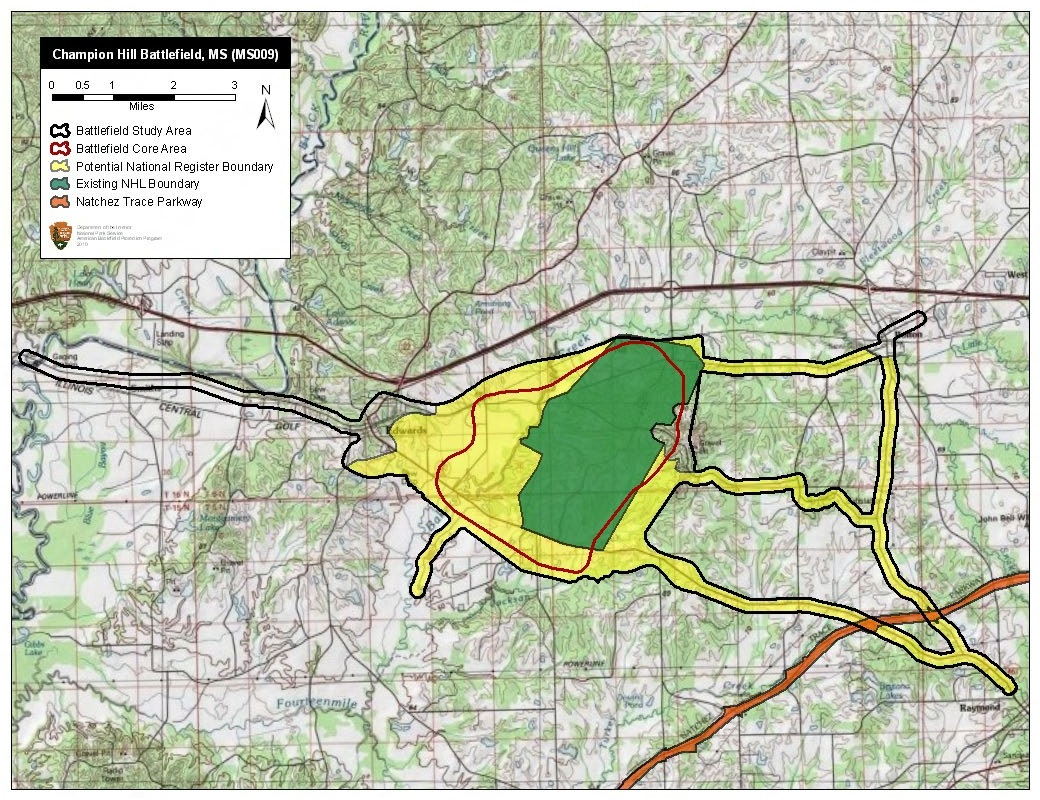
Map of Champion Hill Battlefield core and study areas by the American Battlefield Protection Program

== Aftermath ==
Champion Hill was a bloody and decisive Union victory. In his Personal Memoirs, Grant observed, "While a battle is raging, one can see his enemy mowed down by the thousand, or the ten thousand, with great composure; but after the battle these scenes are distressing, and one is naturally disposed to alleviate the sufferings of an enemy as a friend."

Grant criticized the lack of fighting spirit of McClernand, a rival for Union Army leadership, because he had not killed or captured Pemberton's entire force. McClernand's casualties were low on the Union left flank (south); McPherson's on the right constituted the bulk of the Union losses, about 2,500. The Confederates suffered about 3,800 casualties. According to diarist William Eddington, so many Confederate horses had been killed, Union soldiers could not easily approach the abandoned batteries; after the Battle of Big Black River Bridge, Union horses were sent back to recover them. The Confederates' effective loss included most of Loring's division, which had marched off on its own to join Joseph E. Johnston in Jackson.

== Battlefield preservation ==
- Champion Hill Battlefield
- U.S. National Register of Historic Places
- U.S. National Historic Landmark District
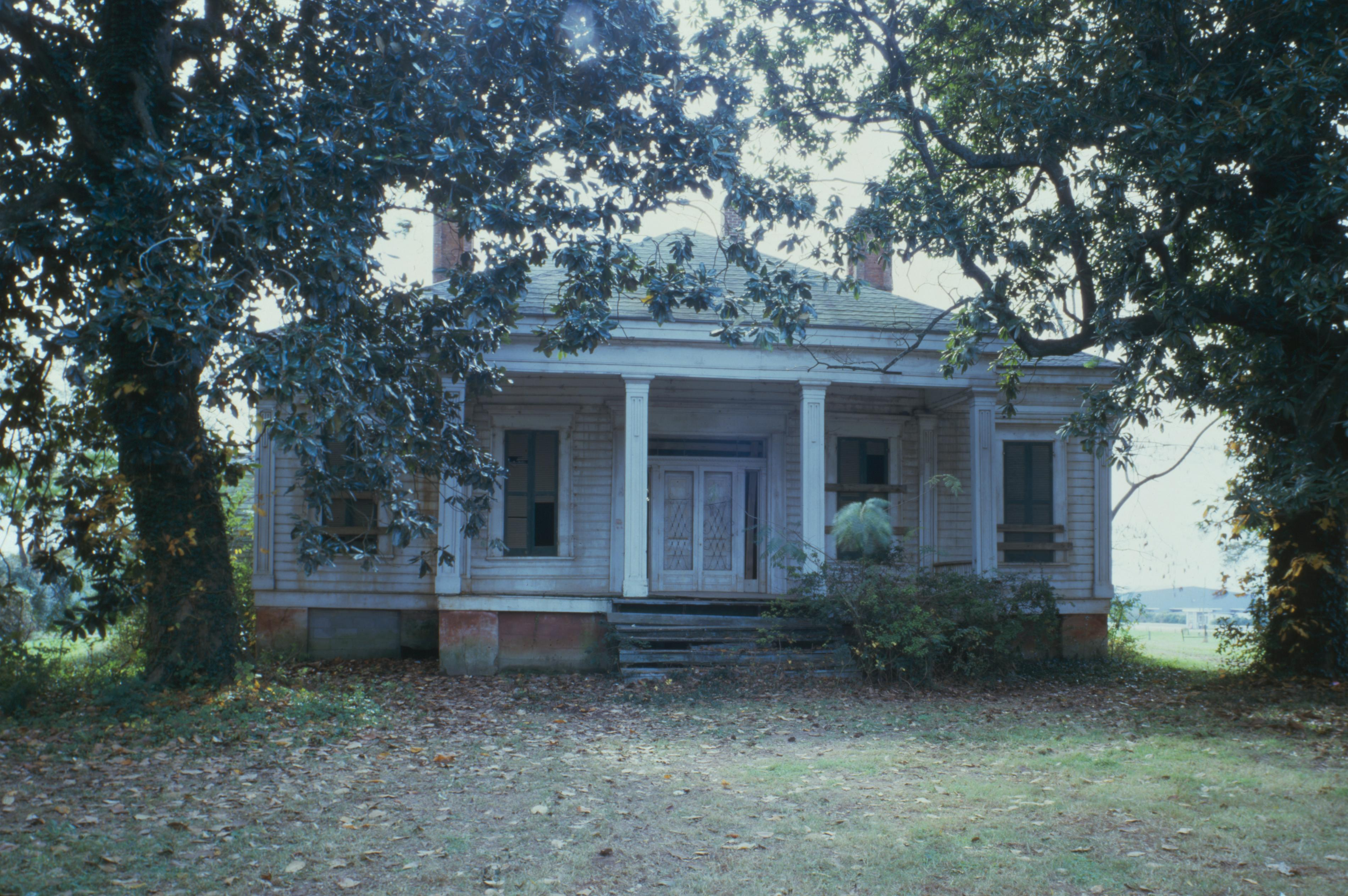
- The Coker House, a part of the battlefield

- Location within Mississippi Location within the United States
- Nearest city: Bolton, Mississippi
- Coordinates: 32°20′00″N 90°31′40″W
- Area: 4,000 acres (1,600 ha)
- NRHP reference No.: 71000450

Significant dates
- Added to NRHP: October 7, 1971
- Designated NHLD: May 5, 1977

An area of 4,000 acres (1,600 ha) was listed as the Champion Hill Battlefield on the National Register of Historic Places in 1971. The listing covered 4,000 acres (1,600 ha) including three contributing buildings, one contributing site, and one contributing object. It was further designated a National Historic Landmark District in 1977. It is located about 3 miles southwest of Bolton, Mississippi.

Large sections of the battlefield remain well preserved, including original roads, as evidenced by a view of the field from approximately the site of the Davis sketch. The map reference refers to the small stone historical marker at the corner of Billy Fields Road and DJ Johnson road, very central in the field.

As of October 2012, residential development had encroached on limited parts of the field, near the center, along DJ Johnson Road. Thousands of acres of the core battlefield are privately owned, listed as II.1. Class A (opportunity for comprehensive preservation, good integrity, low threat) by the Civil War Sites Advisory Commission. Discontinuous portions of the battlefield, totaling over 800 acres (3.2 km^{2}), are owned by the State of Mississippi. These properties are being held for possible future inclusion in Vicksburg National Military Park. The American Battlefield Trust and its partners have been able to protect more than 1,222 acres (4.95 km^{2}) of the battlefield through conservation easements and land purchases from 2003 through mid-2023. In October 2007, Sid Champion, together with three family members who co-own the land, worked with the trust to craft a unique easement to protect 147 acres (0.59 km^{2}) of the family farm comprising a key part of the field. The 795 acres preserved by the trust and its partners at Champion Hill through mid-2018 includes a 319-acre tract acquired for $1.28 million and announced in May 2017.

The Coker House stands adjacent to a south portion of the Champion Hill Battlefield. It was used as a hospital by Union forces and upon departing, the Yankees extensively looted both the house and the plantation stores. Bullet holes in the front door and jamb and cannonball holes on the west side of the Coker House remained as evidence of the battle. In 1985, the historic property was donated to the Jackson Civil War Roundtable, which later deeded it to the Mississippi Department of Archives and History. As of 2005 the house was in ruins, but it has since been rebuilt using the original materials as much as possible, as it had deteriorated too far to be restored. Historical markers at the house detail the battle and the history of the house.

Hiawatha (Yeiser House) is one of only a few structures from the battlefield that has survived. In 2006, it was moved 11 miles east to Raymond, Mississippi, and restored by Peggy and Bobby DeLaughter. The house was used as a hospital during the battle and is where Confederate general Lloyd Tilghman was brought after being fatally wounded.

== Gallery ==
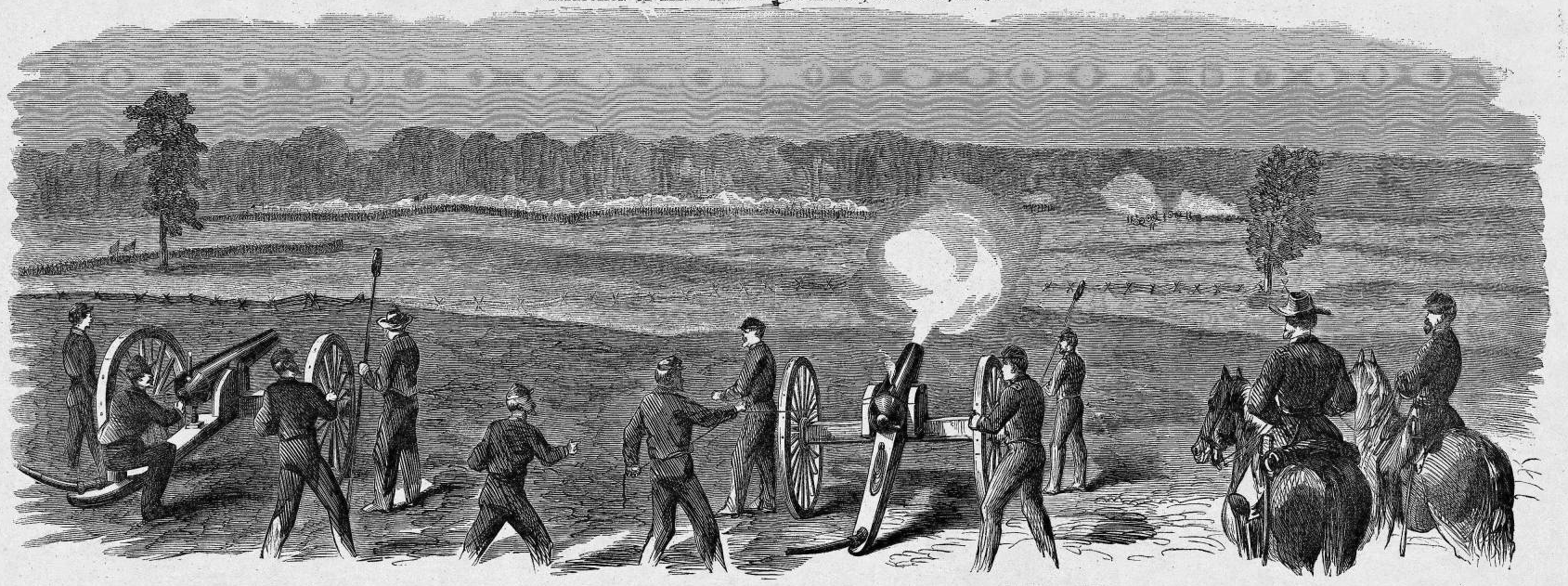
Battle of Champion Hill, Harper's Weekly, Volume: 1863, Issue: 06/20. Sketched by Theodore R. Davis.

Field in October 2012 from approximately the site of the Davis sketch

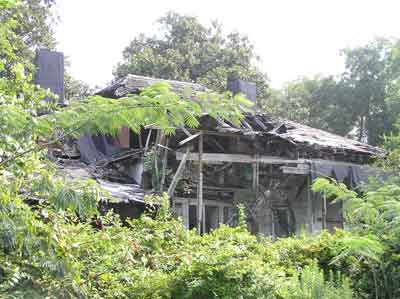
Ruins of the Coker House in 2005

Rebuilt Coker House in October 2012

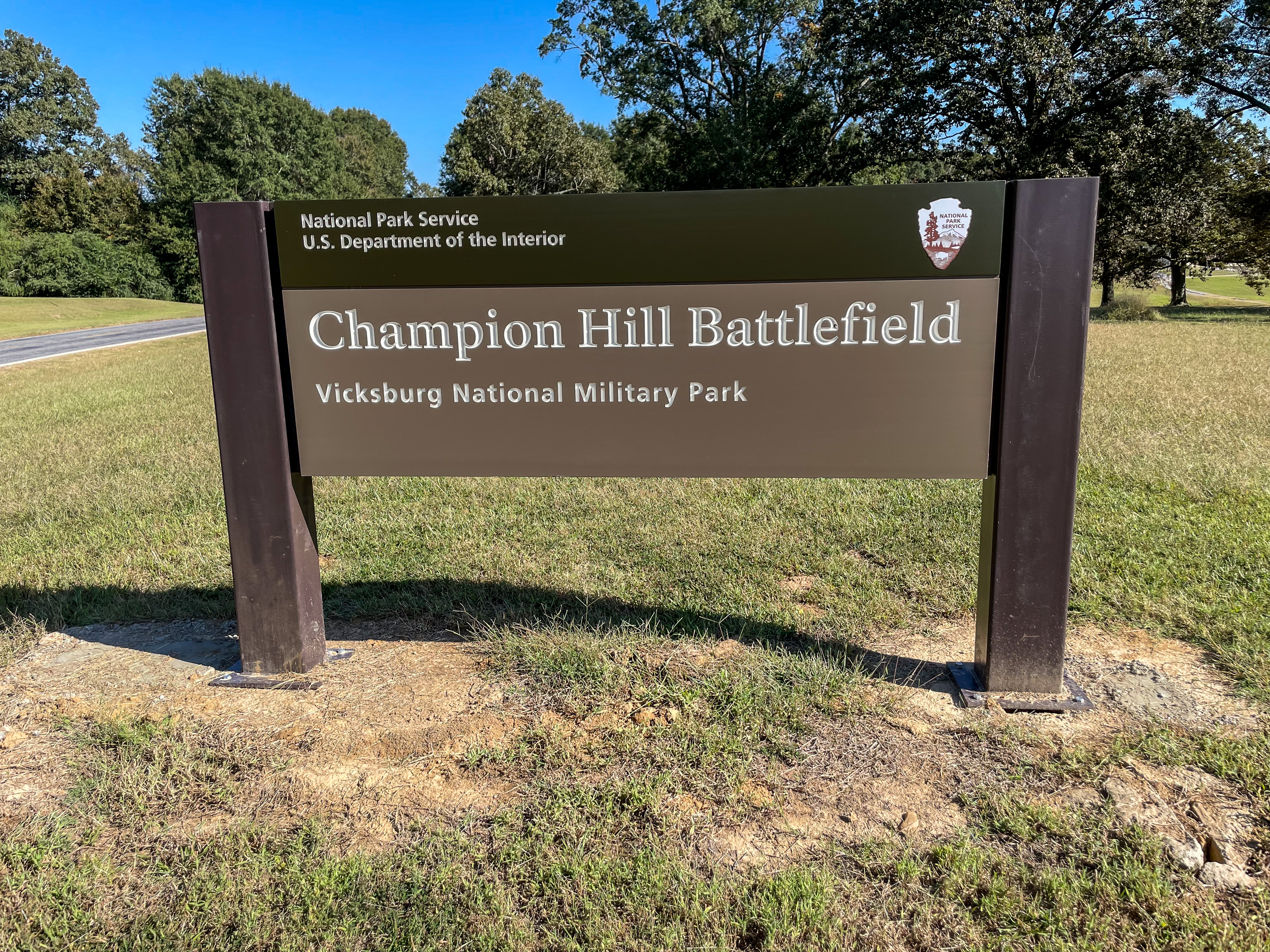
National Park Service sign erected in 2022

== See also ==
- List of costliest American Civil War land battles
- Troop engagements of the American Civil War, 1863
