= 26th Ohio Independent Light Artillery Battery =

26th Ohio Battery
- Active: December 22, 1863, to September 2, 1865
- Country: United States
- Allegiance: Union
- Branch: Artillery
- Engagements: Battle of Port Gibson; Battle of Raymond; Battle of Jackson; Battle of Champion Hill; Siege of Vicksburg, May 19 & May 22 assaults

26th Ohio Battery was an artillery battery that served in the Union Army during the American Civil War.

== Service ==
The 26th Ohio Battery was originally organized as Company F, 32nd Ohio Infantry at Camp Dennison near Cincinnati, Ohio, in August 1861. The battery was detached on July 20, 1862, under the command of Captain Theobold D. Yost. However, due to being captured at Harpers Ferry, paroled, exchanged, and then reassigned as infantry, then assigned again as artillery to other units, the battery was not permanently detached from the 32nd Ohio Infantry until December 22, 1864. During the Vicksburg Campaign, the battery was known as Yost's Independent Ohio Battery.

The 26th Ohio Battery mustered out of service on September 2, 1865, at Tod Barracks in Columbus, Ohio.

== Detailed service ==
Stationed at Winchester until September 11. Retreat to Harpers Ferry September 11–12. Defense of Harpers Ferry September 12–15. Battery surrendered September 15. Paroled and sent to Annapolis, Md., then to Chicago, Ill., and to Camp Taylor, Cleveland, Ohio. Exchanged January 12, 1863. Again attached to 32nd Ohio Infantry and moved to Memphis, Tenn., January 20–25, 1863. Moved to Lake Providence, La., February 20, and to Milliken's Bend, La., April 17. Movement on Bruinsburg, Mississippi and turning Grand Gulf April 25–30. Battle of Port Gibson, Miss., May 1. Raymond May 12. Jackson May 14. Champion Hill May 16. Capture a battery of six guns and assigned to duty as artillery until August 3, 1863. Siege of Vicksburg, Miss., May 18-July 4. Assaults on Vicksburg May 19 and 22. Attached to Battery D, 1st Illinois Light Artillery and to 3rd Ohio Battery August 3 to December 22, 1863, and garrison duty at Vicksburg, Miss. Served with Artillery, 3rd Division, XVII Corps. Expedition to Monroe, La., August 20-September 2, 1863. Expedition to Canton and Brownsville October 14–20. Permanently detached from 32nd Ohio Infantry as 26th Ohio Battery December 22, 1863. On veteran furlough January 1 to February 3, 1864. Meridian Campaign February 3-March 2. Duty at Vicksburg until November 1864, attached to Maltby's Brigade, District of Vicksburg. Expedition to Rodney and Fayette September 29-October 3. Expedition to Woodville October 4–11. Woodville October 5–6. Moved to Natchez, Miss., and garrison duty there until April 1865. Ordered to Texas April 1865, and duty on the Rio Grande, Texas, until August. Ordered home for muster out.

== Casualties ==
The battery lost a total of 22 enlisted men during service, all due to disease.

== Commanders ==
- Captain Theobold D. Yost

== See also ==
- List of Ohio Civil War units
- Ohio in the Civil War
