= 32nd Ohio Infantry Regiment =

- Active: July 1861 to July 20, 1865
- Country: United States
- Allegiance: Union
- Branch: Union Army
- Type: Infantry
- Engagements: Battle of Cheat Mountain; Battle of Greenbrier River; Battle of McDowell; Battle of Cross Keys; Battle of Harpers Ferry; Battle of Port Gibson; Battle of Raymond; Battle of Jackson; Battle of Champion Hill; Siege of Vicksburg (May 19 & May 22 assaults); Atlanta campaign; Battle of Kennesaw Mountain; Battle of Atlanta; Siege of Atlanta; Battle of Jonesborough; Battle of Lovejoy's Station; Sherman's March to the Sea; Carolinas campaign; Battle of Bentonville

The 32nd Ohio Infantry Regiment was an infantry regiment in the Union Army during the American Civil War.

== Service ==
The 32nd Ohio Infantry Regiment was organized at Mansfield, Ohio August 20-September 7, 1861, and mustered in for three years service under the command of Colonel Thomas H. Ford. Company F was permanently detached December 22, 1863, and was thereafter known as the 26th Ohio Battery. A replacement Company F was mustered in April 1864.

The regiment was attached to Kimball's Brigade, Cheat Mountain, District West Virginia, to November 1861. Milroy's Brigade, Reynolds' Command, Cheat Mountain, District West Virginia, to March 1862. Milroy's Brigade, Department of the Mountains, to June 1862. Piatt's 2nd Brigade, 1st Division, I Corps, Pope's Army of Virginia, to July 1862. Piatt's Brigade, White's Division, Winchester, Virginia, to September 1862. Miles' Command, Harper's Ferry, Virginia, September 1862. 3rd Brigade, 3rd Division, XVII Corps, Army of the Tennessee, January to December 1863. 2nd Brigade, 3rd Division, XVII Corps, to July 1864. 1st Brigade, 4th Division, XVII Corps, to April 1865. 2nd Brigade, 4th Division, XVII Corps, to July 1865.

The 32nd Ohio Infantry mustered out of service at Louisville, Kentucky, on July 20, 1865.

== Detailed service ==
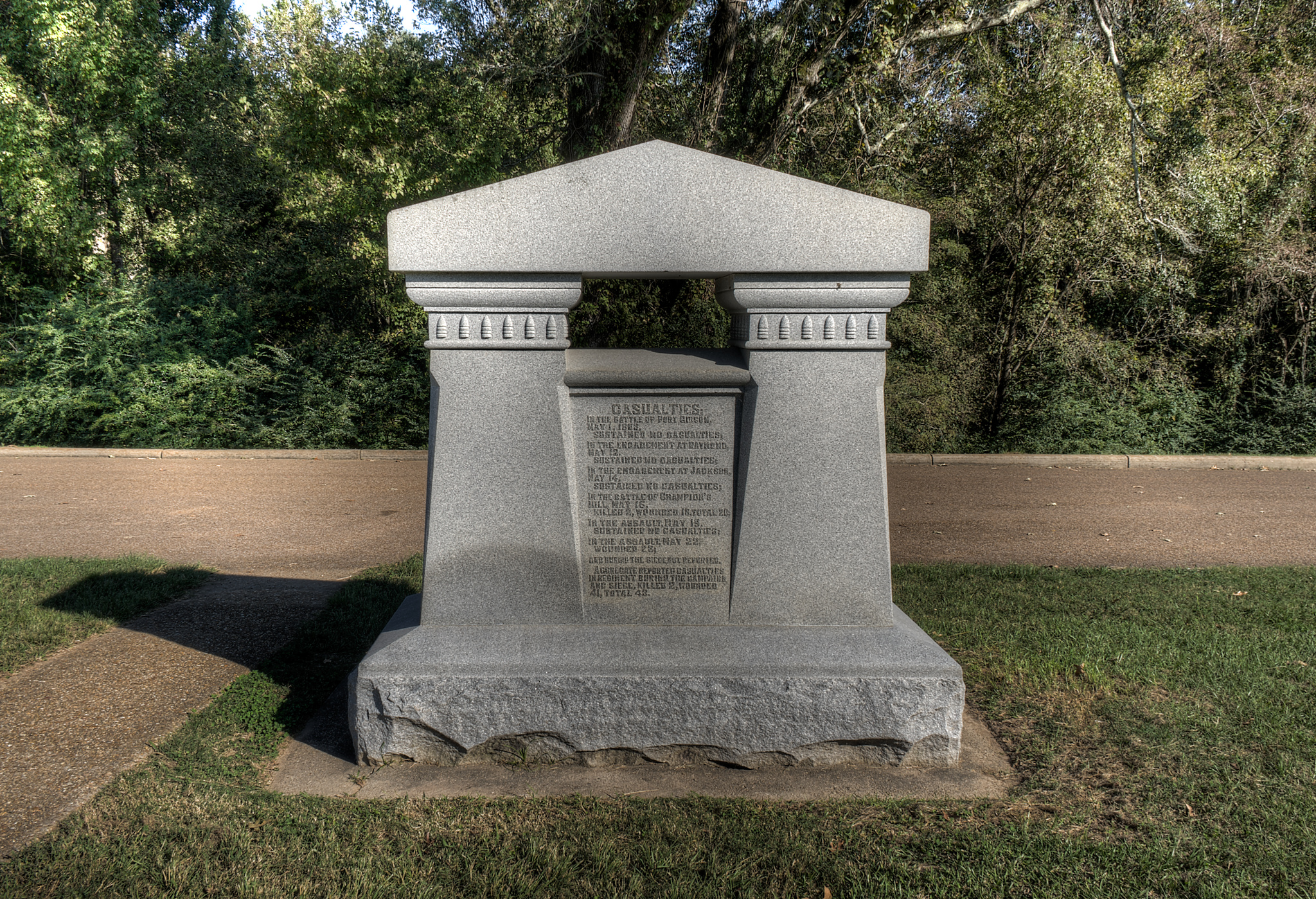
Memorial at Vicksburg National Military Park

Left Ohio for Grafton, Va., September 15, then moved to Cheat Mountain Summit. Action at Greenbrier River, Va., October 3–4, 1861. Duty at Greenbrier until December. Action at Camp Allegheny December 13. Duty at Beverly December 1861 to April 1862. Expedition on the Seneca April 1–12. Action at Monterey April 12. At Staunton until May 7. Battle of McDowell May 8. Battle of Cross Keys June 8. Duty at Strasburg and Winchester until September. Evacuation of Winchester September 2. Defense of Harpers Ferry, September 12–15. Maryland Heights September 12–13. Regiment captured September 15. Paroled September 16 and sent to Annapolis, Md., then to Chicago, Ill., and to Cleveland, Ohio. Exchanged January 12, 1863. Moved to Memphis, Tenn., January 20–25, 1863, then to Lake Providence, La., February 20, and to Milliken's Bend, La., April 17. Movement on Bruinsburg, Mississippi and turning Grand Gulf April 25–30. Battle of Port Gibson May 1. Raymond May 12. Jackson May 14. Champion Hill May 16. Siege of Vicksburg, Miss., May 18-July 4. Assaults on Vicksburg May 19 and 22. Surrender of Vicksburg July 4, and garrison duty there until February 1864. Expedition to Monroe, La., August 20-September 2, 1863. Expedition to Canton October 14–20. Bogue Chitto Creek October 17. Meridian Campaign February 3-March 2. Baker's Creek February 5. Moved to Clifton, Tenn., thence march to Ackworth, Ga., April 21-June 8. Atlanta Campaign, June 8-September 8. Operations about Marietta and against Kennesaw Mountain June 10-July 2. Assault on Kennesaw June 27. Nickajack Creek July 2–5. Howell's Ferry July 5. Chattahoochie River July 6–17. Leggett's or Bald Hill July 20–21. Battle of Atlanta July 22. Siege of Atlanta July 22-August 25. Flank movement on Jonesborough August 25–30. Battle of Jonesborough August 31-September 1. Lovejoy's Station September 2–6. Operations against Hood in northern Georgia and northern Alabama September 29-November 3. Shadow Church and Westbrook's near Fairburn October 2. March to the sea November 15-December 10. Louisville November 30. Siege of Savannah December 10–21. Campaign of the Carolinas January to April 1865. Salkehatchie Swamp, S.C., February 2–5. River's Bridge, Salkehatchie River, February 3. South Edisto River February 9. Orangeburg February 11–12. Columbia February 15–17. Fayetteville, N.C., March 11. Battle of Bentonville March 20–21. Occupation of Goldsboro March 24. Advance on Raleigh April 10–14. Occupation of Raleigh April 14. Bennett's House April 26. Surrender of Johnston and his army. March to Washington, D.C., via Richmond, Va., April 29-May 20. Grand Review of the Armies May 24. Moved to Louisville, Ky., June 8.

== Casualties ==
The regiment lost a total of 240 men during service; 5 officers and 99 enlisted men killed or mortally wounded, 2 officers and 143 enlisted men died of disease.

== Commanders ==
- Colonel Thomas H. Ford - Charged with neglect at Battle of Harpers Ferry. After trial, dismissed November 8, 1862, by order of War Department.
- Colonel Benjamin Franklin Potts - promoted to brigadier general, January 16, 1865
- Colonel Jefferson J. Hibbets - mustered out with regiment July 20, 1865
- Lieutenant Colonel Ebenezer H. Swinney - commanded at the battle of McDowell and Cross Keys (discharged November 21, 1862)

== See also ==
- List of Ohio Civil War units
- Ohio in the Civil War
