= 7th Missouri Infantry Regiment =

7th Missouri Infantry Regiment ("Irish Seventh")
- Active: June 1861 to December 17, 1864
- Country: United States
- Allegiance: Union
- Branch: Infantry
- Engagements: Battle of Port Gibson; Battle of Raymond; Battle of Champion Hill; Battle of Big Black River Bridge; Siege of Vicksburg, May 19 & May 22 assaults Battle of Bogue Chitto Creek

The 7th Missouri Infantry Regiment, commonly known as the "Irish Seventh", was an infantry regiment that served in the Union Army during the American Civil War. In 1864 a battalion of veteran volunteers of the "Irish Seventh was consolidated with a sister Irish regiment, the 30th Missouri Volunteer Infantry (the "Shamrock Regiment") and operated as a "demi-brigade" known popularly as the "Missouri Irish Brigade"

== Service ==
The 7th Missouri Infantry Regiment was organized at St. Louis, Missouri, in June 1861 and mustered in for three years service. It was often referred to as the "Irish Seventh" given the large number of Irish immigrants who were enlisted in its ranks.

The regiment was a special project supported by the Federal commanders in Missouri, Brigadier General William S. Harney and Brigadier General Nathaniel Lyon. Most of the volunteers in Missouri's early regiments were German immigrants, and Lyon supported the creation of a regiment recruited from St. Louis' Irish-American population to demonstrate that the Union cause in Missouri had support beyond the German-American community. Many St. Louis Irish (the second largest immigrant community in the city) were ambivalent about the new Republican Party and Federal military action against seceding states. In addition, Irish Americans were strong participants in the pre-war Missouri Volunteer Militia, and many resented the May 10, 1861 Federal arrest of the Militia for suspected secession activity. The 7th Missouri was intended to attract ethnic-Irish support by focusing on the Irish community's "ownership" of the regiment, and make a public political statement by demonstrating that there were Irish Unionists in Missouri.

Like other ethnically Irish regiments during the Civil War, the "Irish Seventh" carried a distinctive green regimental color. An article in the July 12, 1862 Boston Pilot described the flag, stating that on one side the flag featured the: "Irish harp, guarded by a savage-looking wolf dog, surrounded by a wreath of shamrocks, surmounted by an American eagle, and supported on either side by flags and other implements of war. A golden halo shoots out and over the whole. On the other side is a 'sunburst' in all its glory, with the Irish war cry as a motto - 'Faj an Bealac![sic]"

The regiment was attached to Boonville, Missouri, to September 1861. Fremont's Army of the West to February 1862. Lexington, Missouri, Department of the Missouri, to July 1862. Unattached, Pittsburg Landing, Tennessee, Army of the Tennessee, to September 1862. 4th Brigade, 1st Division, District of JacksonJackson, Tennessee, to November 1862. 4th Brigade, 3rd Division, Left Wing, XIII Corps, Department of the Tennessee, to December 1862. 3rd Brigade, 3rd Division, XVII Corps, to April 1864. Maltby's Brigade, District of Vicksburg, Mississippi, to June 1864. 1st Brigade, District of Memphis, Tennessee, XVI Corps, to August 1864. 1st Brigade, 2nd Division, XIX Corps, Department of the Gulf, to December 1864.

The 7th Missouri Volunteer Infantry ceased to exist on December 17, 1864, when it was consolidated with the 30th Missouri Infantry.

== Detailed service ==
Moved to Booneville, Mo., July 1–4, 1861, then to Rolla August 30 and to Syracuse, Mo., October 5–10. Fremont's Campaign against Springfield, Missouri October 21-November 2. Moved to Sedalia, Missouri November 10–14, then to Otterville, Missouri December and duty there until February 1862. Expedition to Blue Springs January 20-February 3, 1862 (Companies B, F, and H detached from regiment November 21, 1861, and ordered to Kansas City. Rejoined regiment at Lexington, Mo., February 1862.) Moved to Lexington, Mo., February 3–10, 1862, and duty there until May 9. Reconnaissance from Greenville, Missouri February 23–24 (Company H). Skirmish at Mingo Creek, near St. Francisville, February 24 (Company H). Moved to Pittsburg Landing, Tenn., May 9–14, and guard and fatigue duty there until August 15. Moved to Jackson, Tenn., August 15–29, and duty there until October. Medon Station, Mississippi Central Railroad, August 31. Chewalla and Big Hill October 5. Medon Station October 10. Moved to Corinth with McPherson and to Jackson October 14. To Lagrange November 2. Grant's Central Mississippi Campaign November 2, 1862, to January 10, 1863. At Memphis, Tenn., January 17-February 21. Moved to Lake Providence, Louisiana, February 21, and duty there until April. Moved to Milliken's Bend, Louisiana., April 12. Passage of Vicksburg batteries April 22 (detachment). Movement on Bruinsburg, Mississippi and turning Grand Gulf April 25–39. Battle of Port Gibson May 1. Bayou Pierrie May 2. Battles of Raymond May 12. Champion Hill May 16. Big Black River Bridge May 17. Siege of Vicksburg, Miss., May 18-July 4. Assaults on Vicksburg May 19 and 22. Surrender of Vicksburg July 4. Provost duty there until June 1864. Stevenson's Expedition from Vicksburg to Monroe, Louisiana, August 20-September 2, 1863. Expedition toward Canton October 14–22. Bogue Chitto Creek October 17. Expedition from Vicksburg to Sunnyside Landing, Ark., January 10–16, 1864. Meridian Campaign February 3-March 2. Clinton February 5. Veterans on furlough March to May. Non-veterans mustered out June 14, 1864. Veterans at Memphis, Tenn., and Vicksburg, Miss., until July 29. Moved to Morganza, La., July 29 and duty there until September 3. Moved to mouth of White River, Ark., September 3–8 and duty there until October 18. Movement to Memphis and return October 18–30. Moved to Duvall's Bluff, Ark., November 9, then to Memphis, Tenn., November 28.

== Casualties ==
The regiment lost a total of 186 men during service; 4 officers and 52 enlisted men killed or mortally wounded, 2 officers and 128 enlisted men died of disease.

== Commanders ==
- Colonel John Dunlap Stevenson
- Major Edwin Wakefield - commanded at the battle of Raymond
- Captain Robert Buchanan - commanded at the battle of Champion Hill and during the siege of Vicksburg
- Captain William B. Collins - commanded during the siege of Vicksburg

== See also ==
- Missouri Civil War Union units
- Missouri in the Civil War
