= John Dunlap Stevenson =

American politician (1821–1897)

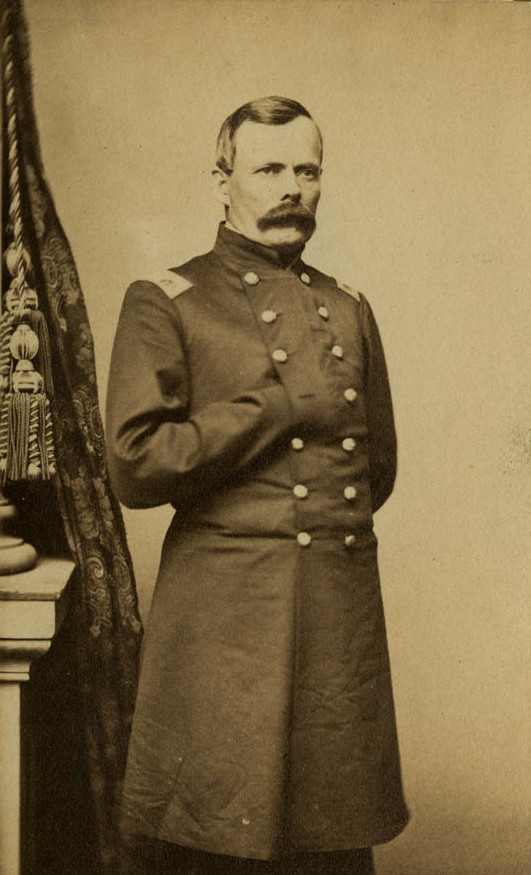
- Stevenson as colonel.
- Born: June 8, 1821; Staunton, Virginia
- Died: January 22, 1897 (aged 75); St. Louis, Missouri
- Burial place: Bellefontaine Cemetery, St. Louis, Missouri
- Military career
- Allegiance: United States of America; Union
- Branch: United States Army; Union Army
- Service years: 1846–1847, 1861–1870
- Rank: Brigadier General; Brevet Major General
- Commands: 7th Missouri Infantry Regiment; 3rd Brigade, 3rd Division, XVII Corps; 30th U.S. Infantry Regiment
- Conflicts: Mexican–American War; American Civil War: Battle of Port Gibson; Battle of Raymond; Battle of Champion Hill; Siege of Vicksburg
- Other work: Law

John Dunlap Stevenson (June 8, 1821 – January 22, 1897) was an American attorney, politician, and soldier in the U.S. Army in two wars. He was a brigadier general of volunteers during the American Civil War. In 1866 he was nominated and confirmed for appointment as brevet major general of volunteers.

== Biography ==
Stevenson was born at Staunton, Virginia on June 8, 1821. After attending the College of South Carolina, he began practicing law in Franklin County, Missouri, in 1842. He served as a company commander in the 1st Missouri Mounted Volunteers, starting June 27, 1846, during Brigadier General Stephen Kearny's invasion of the New Mexico Territory in the Mexican–American War. Stevenson was mustered out of the volunteers on June 24, 1847. Stevenson later became a member of the Missouri state legislature. Even though he had been born in Virginia and had graduated from college in South Carolina, he became a strong supporter of the Union cause.

Stevenson entered the service in the Union Army as colonel of the 7th Missouri Volunteer Infantry Regiment. He soon had temporary command of brigades in the Army of the Tennessee.

On March 13, 1863, President of the United States Abraham Lincoln appointed Stevenson brigadier general of volunteers in the Union Army, to rank from November 29, 1862. Lincoln nominated Stevenson for the appointment on March 4, 1863, and the United States Senate confirmed the appointment on March 11, 1863. Because of a change in the rank date, which was initially to be on December 24, 1862, Lincoln submitted the nomination again on December 12, 1864, and the U.S. Senate confirmed the appointment on March 14, 1865. Stevenson resigned from the army as a brigadier general on April 22, 1864, but was recommissioned to rank from November 29, 1862, on August 7, 1864. He served in the Department of West Virginia thereafter.

Stevenson commanded the 3rd Brigade, 3rd Division, XVII Corps, referred to as the "Irish Brigade" during the Vicksburg Campaign. He is most famous for making a charge at the Battle of Champion Hill which broke the Confederate left flank. On March 26, 1867, President Andrew Johnson nominated Stevenson for appointment as a brevet brigadier general in the Regular Army (United States), to rank from March 2, 1867, and the United States Senate confirmed the appointment on April 5, 1867, for his service at Champion Hill. Stevenson participated in the subsequent siege and mine explosion at Vicksburg. He later commanded the District of Corinth.

Stevenson was mustered out of the volunteers on January 15, 1866. On February 24, 1866, President Andrew Johnson nominated Stevenson for appointment to the grade of brevet major general of volunteers, to rank from March 13, 1865, and the United States Senate confirmed the appointment on May 4, 1866.

Stevenson was commissioned a colonel in the Regular Army (United States) and appointed to command the 30th U.S. Infantry Regiment, July 28, 1866. He was unassigned March 15, 1869. He was assigned to the 25th U.S. Infantry, December 15, 1870 and discharged from the regular army December 31, 1870. He returned to the practice law after his discharge from the army.

John D. Stevenson died in St. Louis, Missouri on January 22, 1897, and was buried at Bellefontaine Cemetery, St. Louis.

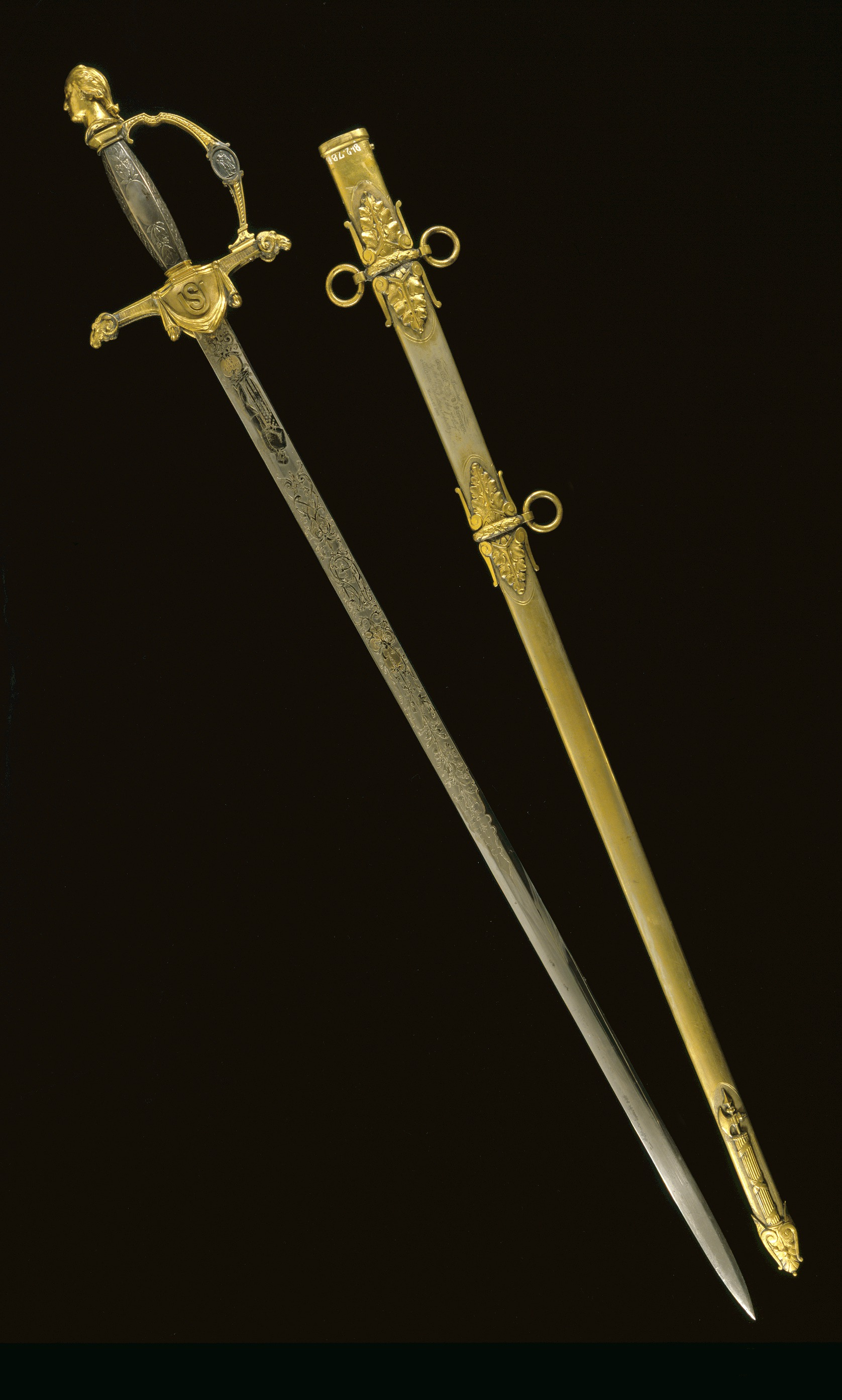
Sword presented to Stevenson by his old regiment in 1863.

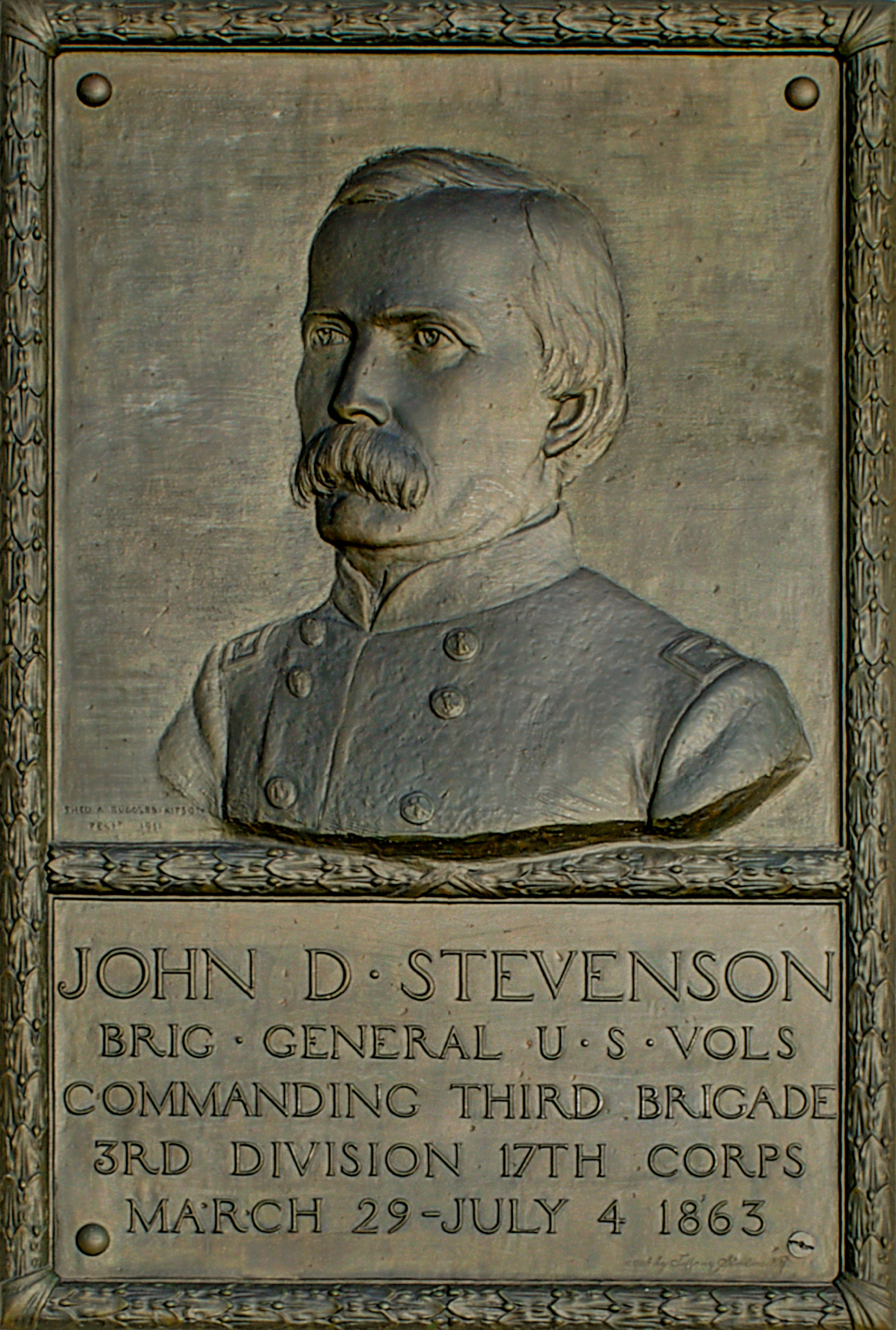
Bronze relief portrait of Stevenson by T.A.R. Kitson at Vicksburg National Military Park

== See also ==
- List of American Civil War generals (Union)
