= John Gregg (Texas politician) =

American politician (1828–1864)

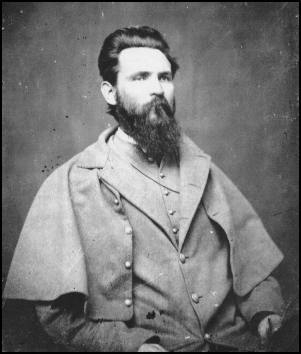
- Gregg in uniform, c. 1862

Deputy from Texas to the Provisional Congress of the Confederate States
- In office February 4, 1861 – February 17, 1862
- Preceded by: New constituency
- Succeeded by: Constituency abolished

Personal details
- Born: September 28, 1828 Lawrence County, Alabama, U.S.
- Died: October 7, 1864 (aged 36) Henrico County, Virginia, U.S.
- Resting place: Odd Fellows Cemetery, Aberdeen, Mississippi, U.S.

Military service
- Allegiance: Confederate States
- Branch/service: Confederate States Army
- Years of service: 1861–1864
- Rank: Brigadier general
- Commands: Texas Brigade
- Battles/wars: American Civil War; Battle of Fort Donelson; Battle of Raymond; Battle of Jackson; Battle of Chickamauga (WIA); Battle of the Wilderness; Battle of Spotsylvania; Battle of Cold Harbor; Siege of Petersburg †

John Gregg (September 28, 1828 – October 7, 1864) was an American politician who served as a deputy from Texas to the Provisional Congress of the Confederate States from 1861 to 1862. He served as a brigade commander officer of the Confederate States Army and was killed in action during the Siege of Petersburg.

== Early life and career ==
John Gregg was born in Lawrence County, Alabama, to Nathan Gregg and Sarah Pearsall Camp. He graduated from LaGrange College (now the University of North Alabama) in 1847, where he was subsequently employed as a professor of mathematics. He later studied law in Tuscumbia, Alabama.

Gregg relocated to Freestone County, Texas, in 1852, and settled in the town of Fairfield, Texas. In May 1854, John was initiated into the Masons at Fairfield Masonic Lodge 103 A.F. & A.M. He was elected as a district judge and served in that position from 1855 until 1860. In 1858, Gregg married Mary Francis "Mollie" Garth from Alabama, daughter of Jesse Winston Garth, a Unionist who was willing to give up his hundreds of slaves if it meant saving the Union. John and Mary appear in the 1860 US census in Fairfield, Freestone County, Texas. Gregg was one of the founders of the Freestone County Pioneer, the first newspaper in Freestone County. He used his paper and political clout to call for a secession convention following the election of Abraham Lincoln as President in 1860.

Gregg served as a delegate to the Texas Secession Convention in Austin, in January 1861. The delegation issued the Ordinance of Secession on February 1, 1861. Gregg was one of six members of the convention who were elected to represent Texas in the Provisional Confederate Congress in Montgomery, Alabama, and later in Richmond, Virginia.

== American Civil War ==
Gregg served in the Provisional Congress of the Confederate States on February 15, 1861, from which he resigned in August 1861 to enter the Confederate Army. He returned to Texas and formed the 7th Texas Infantry, becoming its colonel in September. Gregg and the 7th saw their first action at the Battle of Fort Donelson from February 12 to 16, 1862, where they were captured along with most of the garrison. His men were sent to a prisoner-of-war camp called Camp Douglas located near Chicago. He was sent to Fort Warren in Boston, Massachusetts for confinement.

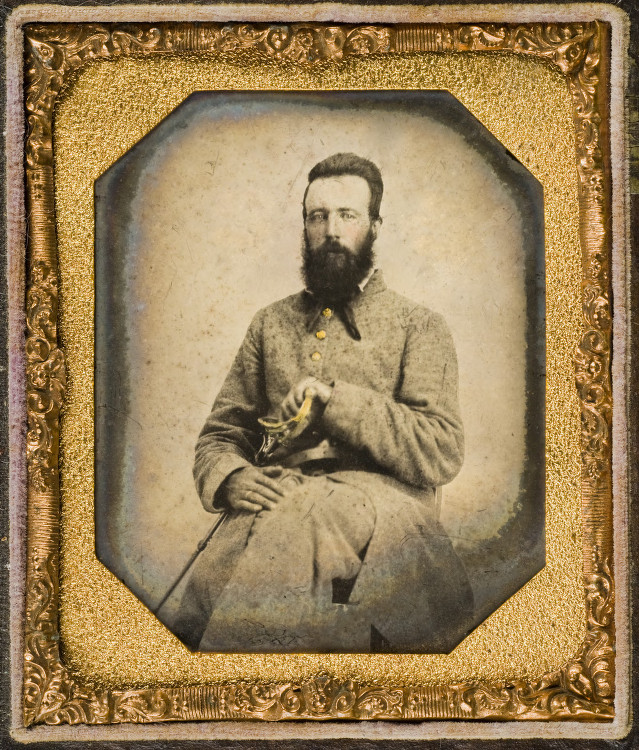
John Gregg, c. 1862

Gregg was exchanged on August 15, 1862, and was promoted to brigadier general on August 29. He was sent to Mississippi for service in the Western Theater of the American Civil War, and was assigned to 10th Brigade, 1st Division of the Army of Mississippi, from October 24, 1862, to March 1863. Gregg's 10th Brigade was then assigned to the 3rd District of the Department of Mississippi and Eastern Louisiana from March to May 1863.

His command, now styled Gregg's Brigade, was attached to William H. T. Walker's division in the Department of the West on May 10, 1863. Gregg's first major action in Mississippi came at the Battle of Raymond, on May 12, 1863, where his 3000-man brigade fought a tough 6-hour battle against the XVII Corps, 10,000 strong, under the command of Union Maj. Gen. James B. McPherson. Gregg was forced to retreat to Jackson, Mississippi after the battle, where he was involved in the Battle of Jackson on May 14, 1863.

Gregg's Brigade formed part of the Reserve Corps of the Army of Tennessee briefly that September. During the Battle of Chickamauga, he was assigned to Bushrod Johnson's division, Third Corps in the Army of Tennessee on September 19. Gregg was severely wounded on September 20, when he was hit in the neck. After recovering from his wounds, Gregg was given command of the famous Hood's Texas Brigade in Robert E. Lee's Army of Northern Virginia.

Gregg and his brigade participated in the Eastern Campaigns of the spring of 1864, seeing action at the Battle of the Wilderness, the Battle of Spotsylvania Court House, the Battle of Cold Harbor, and the Siege of Petersburg. During the fighting in the Wilderness, Gregg was wounded on May 6, 1864, and then went with Lee's army to Petersburg until 1864.

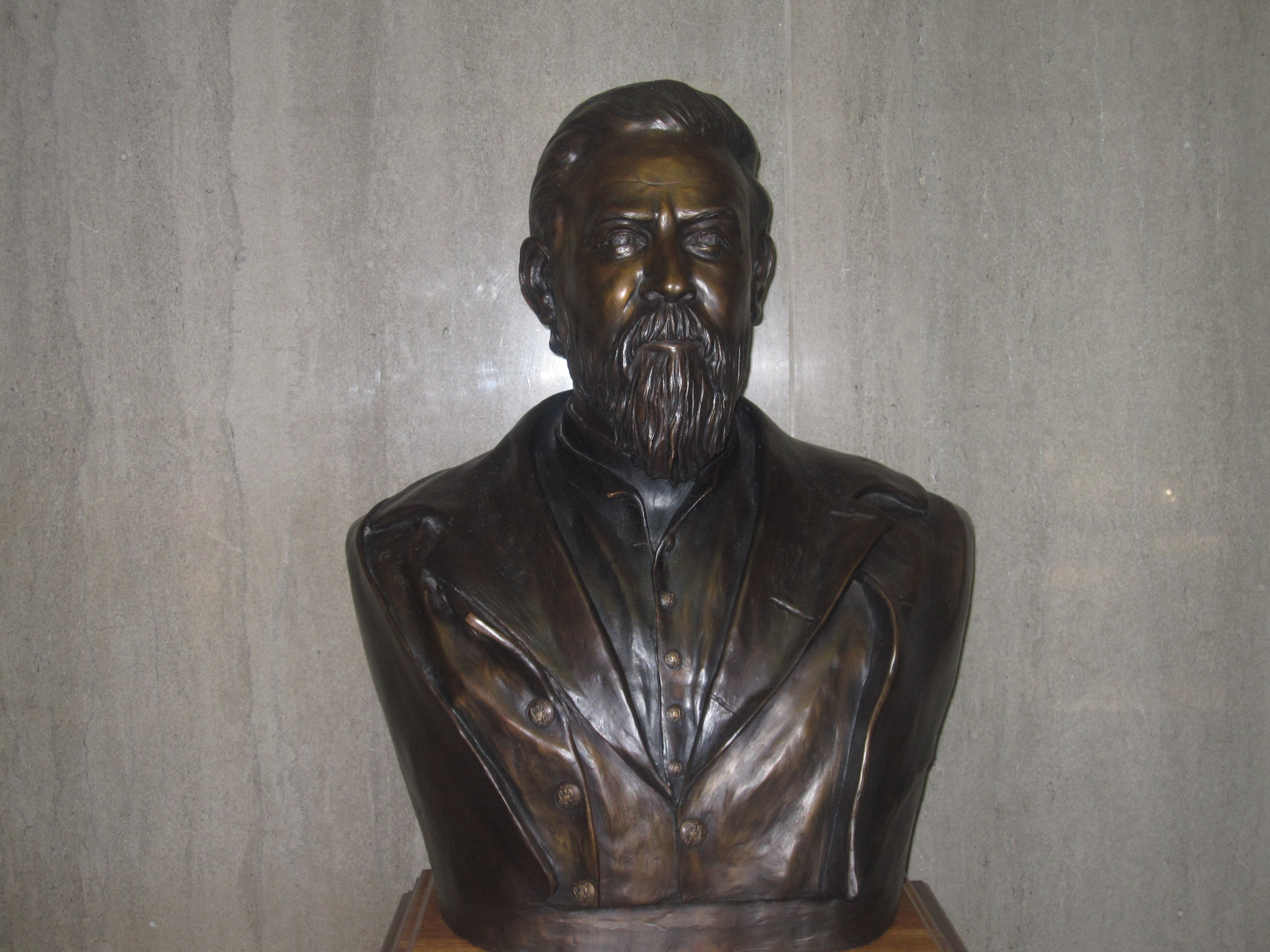
Bust of John Gregg, Gregg County Courthouse, Longview, Texas

== Death ==
On October 7, 1864, Gregg was struck in the neck for a second time and killed along the New Market Road, near Richmond, Virginia. He was shot while leading a counterattack at the Battle of Darbytown and New Market Roads. Gregg was interred at the Odd Fellows Cemetery in Aberdeen, Mississippi; his widow, Mary Garth Gregg, traveled through the lines to retrieve his body.

== Legacy ==
Gregg County, Texas (established 1873), is named after him.

== See also ==
- List of American Civil War generals (Confederate)

Political offices
New constituency	Deputy from Texas to the Provisional Congress of the Confederate States; 1861-1862	Constituency abolished
