= Battery D, 1st Illinois Light Artillery Regiment =

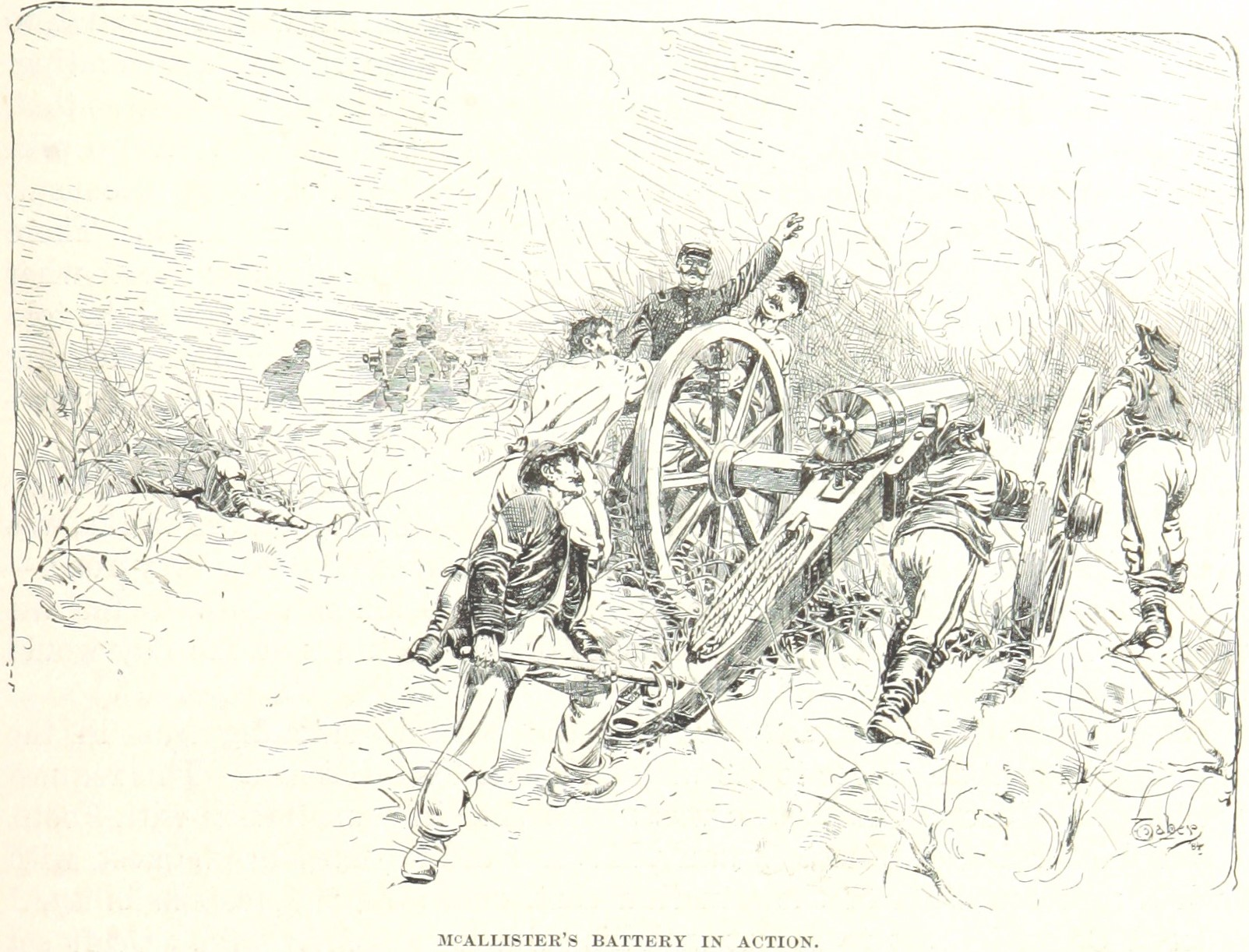
- Battery D in action at the Battle of Fort Donelson
- Active: 30 July 1861 – 28 July 1865
- Country: United States
- Allegiance: (United States) Union; Illinois
- Branch: Union Army
- Type: Field Artillery
- Size: Artillery Battery
- Equipment: M1841 24-pounder howitzer (Apr 1862)
- Engagements: American Civil War; Battle of Fort Donelson (1862); Battle of Shiloh (1862); Battle of Port Gibson (1863); Battle of Raymond (1863); Battle of Jackson (1863); Battle of Champion Hill (1863); Siege of Vicksburg (1863); Meridian campaign (1864); Atlanta campaign (1864); Battle of Atlanta (1864); Battle of Nashville (1864)

Commanders
- Notable commanders: Edward McAllister

Battery D, 1st Illinois Light Artillery Regiment was an artillery battery from the state of Illinois that served in the Union Army during the American Civil War. The battery was authorized in July 1861 at Cairo, Illinois. The unit fought at Fort Donelson and Shiloh in 1862, Port Gibson, Raymond, Jackson, Champion Hill, and Vicksburg in 1863, and Meridian, Atlanta, and Nashville in 1864. The battery was mustered out of Federal service in July 1865.

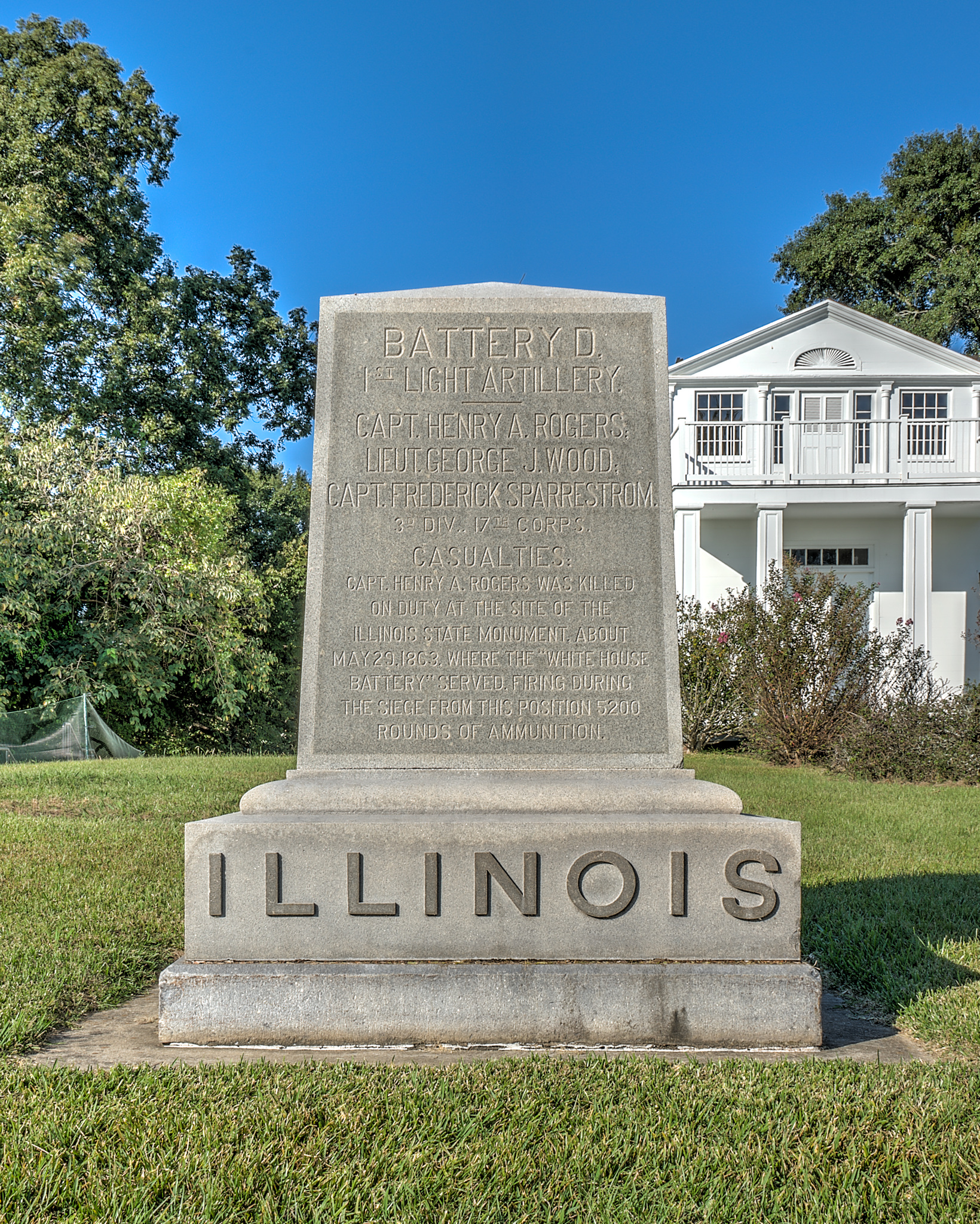
Memorial at Vicksburg National Military Park

== History ==
=== Organization ===
Organized at Cairo, Ill., and mustered on July 30, 1861. Ordered to Fort Holt, Ky., September 18, and duty there until February, 1862. Attached to 2nd Brigade, 1st Division, District of Cairo, February, 1862. 3rd Brigade, 1st Division, District of West Tennessee, and 1st Division, Army Tennessee, to July, 1862. 1st Division, District of Jackson, Tenn., to November, 1862. District of Jackson, 13th Army Corps (Old), Dept. of the Tennessee, November, 1862. Artillery, 3rd Division, Right Wing 13th Army Corps, to December, 1862. Artillery, 3rd Division, 17th Army Corps, Army of the Tennessee, to November, 1864. Artillery Reserve, Nashville, Tenn., to December, 1864. Garrison Artillery, Clarksville, Tenn. 5th Sub-District, District Middle Tennessee, to July, 1865.

=== Service ===
Operations against Fort Henry, Tenn., February 2–6, 1862. At Fort Henry February 6–12. Investment and capture of Fort Donelson, Tenn., February 12–16. Moved to Savannanh, Tenn., March 5–13, thence to Pittsburg Landing, Tenn., March 23–25. Battle at Shiloh, Tenn., April 6–7. Advance on and siege of Corinth, Miss., April 29 – May 30. March to Purdy and Jackson, Tenn., June 5–8, and duty in District of Jackson until November. Grant's Central Mississippi Campaign November 2, 1862, to January 10, 1863. At Memphis, Tenn., until February 20. Moved to Lake Providence, La., February 20–24, thence to Berry's Landing March 16, and to Milliken's Bend April 19. Advance on Bruinsburg and turning Grand Gulf April 25–30. Battle of Port Gibson May 1. Reserve, Raymond May 12. Jackson May 14. Battle of Champion's Hill May 16. Siege of Vicksburg, Miss., May 18 – July 4. Assaults on Vicksburg May 19 and 22. Occupation of Vicksburg July 4 to November 6. Stevenson's Expedition to Monroe, La., August 20 – September 2. Expedition to Canton October 14–20. Bogue Chitto Creek October 17. Duty at Big Black until February, 1864. Meridian Campaign February 3 – March 3. Moved to Cairo, Ill., April 28, thence to Clifton, Tenn., April 30 – May 5, March to Huntsville, Ala., May 5–23, thence to Ackworth, Ga., via Decatur and Warrenton, Ala., and Rome and Kingston, Ga., May 28 – June 8. Atlanta (Ga.) Campaign June S-September 8. Operations about Marietta and against Kenesaw Mountain June 10 – July 2. Assault on Kenesaw June 27. Nickajack Creek July 2–5. Chattahoochie River July 6–17. Leggett's or Bald Hill July 20–21. Battle of Atlanta July 22. Siege of Atlanta July 22 – August 25. Flank movement on Jonesboro August 25–30. Battle of Jonesboro August 31 – September 1. Lovejoy Station September 2–6. Operations against Hood in North Georgia and North Alabama September 29 – November 3. Ordered to Nashville, Tenn., and duty there until December. Battles of Nashville December 15–16. Ordered to Clarksville, Tenn., and duty there until July, 1865. Mustered out July 28, 1865.

== Commanders ==
- Captain Edward McAllister – Resigned 1862.
- Captain Henry A. Rogers – KIA Vicksburg May 29, 1863
- Captain Edgar H. Cooper – promoted to major.
- Lieutenant James A. Borland
- Lieutenant Matthew W. Borland
- Lieutenant George J. Wood Mustered on September 28, 1962, by order of George William Hill. Mustered out by Special Order 269 June 18, 1863 [original letter on file at Illinois State Archives Springfield, Illinois in Adjutant General's Records Collection for 1st Illinois Light Artillery Col. D]
- Lieutenant Charles L. Pratt

== See also ==
- List of Illinois Civil War Units
- Illinois in the American Civil War
