= Battle of Raymond =

1863 battle of the American Civil War

- Part of the American Civil War
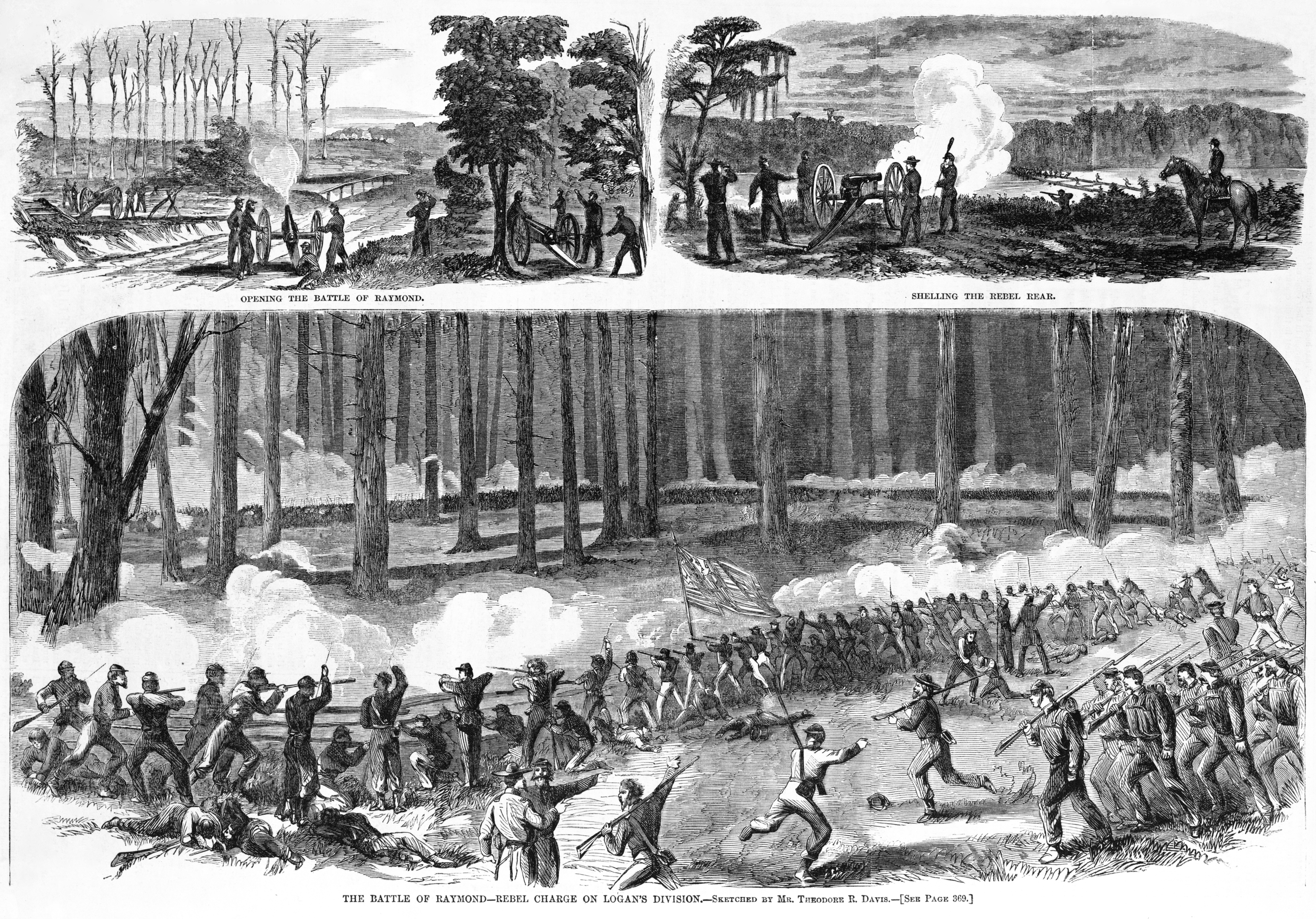
- Three sketches of the battle by Theodore R. Davis
Date	May 12, 1863
Location	Near Raymond, Mississippi 32°14′21″N 90°26′55″W
Result	Union victory

Belligerents
United States (Union)	Confederate States

Commanders and leaders
(United States) James B. McPherson	(Confederate States of America) John Gregg

Units involved
XVII Corps	Gregg's brigade

Strength
10,000 to 12,000	3,000 to 4,000

Casualties and losses
442 or 446	514 or 515
- Location in Mississippi

The Battle of Raymond was fought on May 12, 1863, near Raymond, Mississippi, during the Vicksburg campaign of the American Civil War. Initial Union attempts to capture the strategically important Mississippi River city of Vicksburg failed. Beginning in late April 1863, Union Major General Ulysses S. Grant led another try. After crossing the river into Mississippi and winning the Battle of Port Gibson, Grant began moving east, intending to turn back west and attack Vicksburg. A portion of Grant's army consisting of Major General James B. McPherson's 10,000 to 12,000-man XVII Corps moved northeast towards Raymond. The Confederate commander of Vicksburg, Lieutenant General John C. Pemberton, ordered Brigadier General John Gregg and his 3,000 to 4,000-strong brigade from Jackson to Raymond.

Gregg's brigade contacted the leading elements of McPherson's corps on May 12. Neither commander was aware of the strength of his opponent, and Gregg acted aggressively, thinking McPherson's force was small enough that his men could easily defeat it. McPherson, in turn, overestimated Confederate strength and responded cautiously. The early portions of the battle pitted two brigades of Major General John A. Logan's division against the Confederate force, and the battle was matched relatively evenly. Eventually, McPherson brought up Brigadier General John D. Stevenson's brigade and Brigadier General Marcellus M. Crocker's division. The weight of superior Union numbers eventually began to crack the Confederate line, and Gregg decided to disengage. McPherson's men did not immediately pursue.

The battle at Raymond changed Grant's plans for the Vicksburg campaign, leading him to first focus on neutralizing the Confederate forces at Jackson before turning against Vicksburg. After successfully capturing Jackson, Grant's men pivoted west, drove Pemberton's force into the defenses of Vicksburg, and forced a Confederate surrender on July 4, ending the Siege of Vicksburg. The site of the Battle of Raymond was added to the National Register of Historic Places in 1972, and public interpretation of a portion of the site is provided by the Friends of Raymond. Historians Ed Bearss, Michael Ballard, and Timothy B. Smith have criticized McPherson's handling of the battle.

== Background ==
Early in the Civil War, Union military leadership developed the Anaconda Plan, which was a strategy to defeat the Confederate States of America (a significant component of which was controlling the Mississippi River.) Much of the Mississippi Valley fell under Union control in early 1862 after the capture of New Orleans, Louisiana, and several land victories. The strategically important city of Vicksburg, Mississippi was still in Confederate hands, serving both as a strong defensive position by commanding the river and as the linchpin between the two halves of the Confederacy. Union Navy elements were sent upriver from New Orleans in May to try to take the city, a move that was ultimately unsuccessful. In late June, a joint army-navy expedition returned to make another campaign against Vicksburg. Union Navy leadership decided that the city could not be taken without more infantrymen, who were not forthcoming. An attempt to dig a canal across a meander of the river, bypassing Vicksburg, failed.

In late November, about 40,000 Union infantry commanded by Major General Ulysses S. Grant began moving south towards Vicksburg from a starting point in Tennessee. Grant ordered a retreat after a supply depot and part of his supply line were destroyed during the Holly Springs Raid and Forrest's West Tennessee Raid. Meanwhile, another arm of the expedition under the command of Major General William T. Sherman left Memphis, Tennessee on the same day as the Holly Springs Raid and traveled down the Mississippi River. After diverting up the Yazoo River, Sherman's men began skirmishing with Confederate soldiers defending a line of hills above the Chickasaw Bayou. A Union attack on December 29 was defeated decisively at the Battle of Chickasaw Bayou, and Sherman's men withdrew on January 1, 1863.

== Prelude ==
Grant's Operations against Vicksburg

=== Beginning of Grant's campaign ===
In early 1863, Grant planned further operations against Vicksburg. Some of these plans included revisiting the 1862 canal site attempt, a new plan to cut a canal into the Mississippi River near Lake Providence, Louisiana, and navigating through bayous to bypass Vicksburg. Expeditions sent through the Yazoo River and Steele's Bayou failed to find a viable alternate route. By March 29, these alternatives were abandoned by Grant, leaving him with the choices of attacking Vicksburg from directly across the river, pulling back to Memphis and then attacking overland from the north, or marching south on the Louisiana side of the river and then crossing it below the city. Attacking the enemy from across the river, Grant could have risked heavy casualties, but pulling his men back to Memphis could have been interpreted as a retreat and politically disastrous. This led Grant to choose the southward movement. On April 29, Union Navy ships bombarded Confederate river batteries at Grand Gulf in preparation for a crossing, but they did not silence the position. Grant crossed his men the next day even farther south, at Bruinsburg, Mississippi.

Grant drove inland with 24,000 men, defeating an 8,000-man Confederate blocking force at Port Gibson on May 1; the batteries at Grand Gulf were abandoned the next day. Grant could either move north towards Vicksburg or head east and later turn to the west and attack Vicksburg from this direction. He chose the latter option as it provided a better chance of capturing Vicksburg's Confederate garrison and its commander, Lieutenant General John C. Pemberton. Grant put his plan in motion by having Sherman's XV Corps cross the Mississippi River at the now-abandoned Grand Gulf position and then drive towards Auburn. To Sherman's left, Major General John A. McClernand's XIII Corps covered the crossing of the Big Black River, and on the Union right was Major General John B. McPherson's XVII Corps. McPherson, who lacked experience in leading a sizable body of men in independent command, was directed to advance to Raymond via Utica. McPherson's advance was resisted by little other than militia. Union cavalrymen raided the New Orleans, Jackson and Great Northern Railroad, damaging almost 1.5 miles (2.4 km) of the line. On May 11, Grant ordered McPherson to take his command to Raymond and resupply there while maintaining the impression that he was targeting Jackson.

=== Gregg's approach to Raymond ===
Pemberton responded to the Union movements by moving his forces north along the course of the Big Black River, shadowing the Union movements but never crossing the river. Meanwhile, reinforcements were brought up from elsewhere in the Confederacy and concentrated at Jackson. General Joseph E. Johnston was ordered on May 10 to travel to Jackson to command the growing force, which would eventually amount to about 6,000 men. One of these units was the brigade of Brigadier General John Gregg, which had been sent to Jackson from Port Hudson, Louisiana. In his only aggressive action at the time, Pemberton sent Gregg a telegram ordering him to take his brigade to Raymond with hopes of intercepting a Union unit rumored to be at Utica. Both Gregg and Pemberton believed the Union force was only a single brigade, which would have numbered about 1,500 men. In reality, the Union force at Utica was McPherson's corps, which numbered about 10,000 to 12,000 men. Expecting the main Union assault to come at the Big Black River, Pemberton believed that any movements towards Jackson via Raymond were simply feints. He gave Gregg orders to fall back to Jackson if Union troops pushed through Raymond but to attack the rear of Grant's line if the Union army pivoted towards the Big Black.

Gregg and his men reached Raymond on May 11, expecting to find Colonel Wirt Adams's Confederate cavalry in the town; Adams's men were to conduct reconnaissance. Instead, the only Confederate force in Raymond was a small command of forty cavalrymen – mainly young locals – and a separate five-man detachment. Gregg sent the cavalry unit down the road towards Utica while keeping the five men for courier service, and sent a message to Adams telling him to bring his force to Raymond. The unexpected lack of cavalry at Raymond may have been due to Adams misunderstanding a poorly written order from Pemberton. Adams later sent a unit of fifty cavalrymen to aid Gregg; they arrived that night. On the morning of May 12, the scouting force reported approaching Union soldiers, and Gregg, still anticipating only a single Union brigade, prepared for battle with a force numbering around 3,000 to 4,000 men. The scouts had been unable to provide an accurate count of Union strength. Believing he could easily defeat the approaching enemy force, Gregg responded aggressively.

He ordered Colonel Hiram Granbury to take the 7th Texas Infantry Regiment and the 1st Tennessee Infantry Battalion to a rise near the junction of the roads to Utica and Port Gibson. The Texans were to attract Union attention and draw them into a cul-de-sac-shaped portion of Fourteenmile Creek. Colonel Calvin H. Walker and the 3rd Tennessee Infantry Regiment were sent to the reverse slope of some high ground northeast of the bridge over Fourteenmile Creek. The 50th Tennessee Infantry Regiment and the 10th and 30th Tennessee Infantry Regiment (Consolidated) moved down the Gallatin Road to the left. Gregg planned to contest his line with Walker's and Granbury's men and then have the Tennesseeans down the Gallatin Road conduct a flanking attack against the Union right. Hiram Bledsoe's Missouri Battery and its three cannons were positioned with the 1st Tennessee Battalion. The battery had orders to fire on any Union attempts to cross the bridge over the creek on Utica Road. The 41st Tennessee Infantry Regiment was held in reserve about 0.5 miles (800 m) behind the 3d Tennessee, near the Raymond cemetery. The line was stretched thin to cover the three roads and contained gaps between units. Heavy undergrowth along the position restricted Gregg's ability to clearly observe the Union forces when they came, preventing an accurate assessment of McPherson's strength.

== Battle ==
=== Opening shots ===
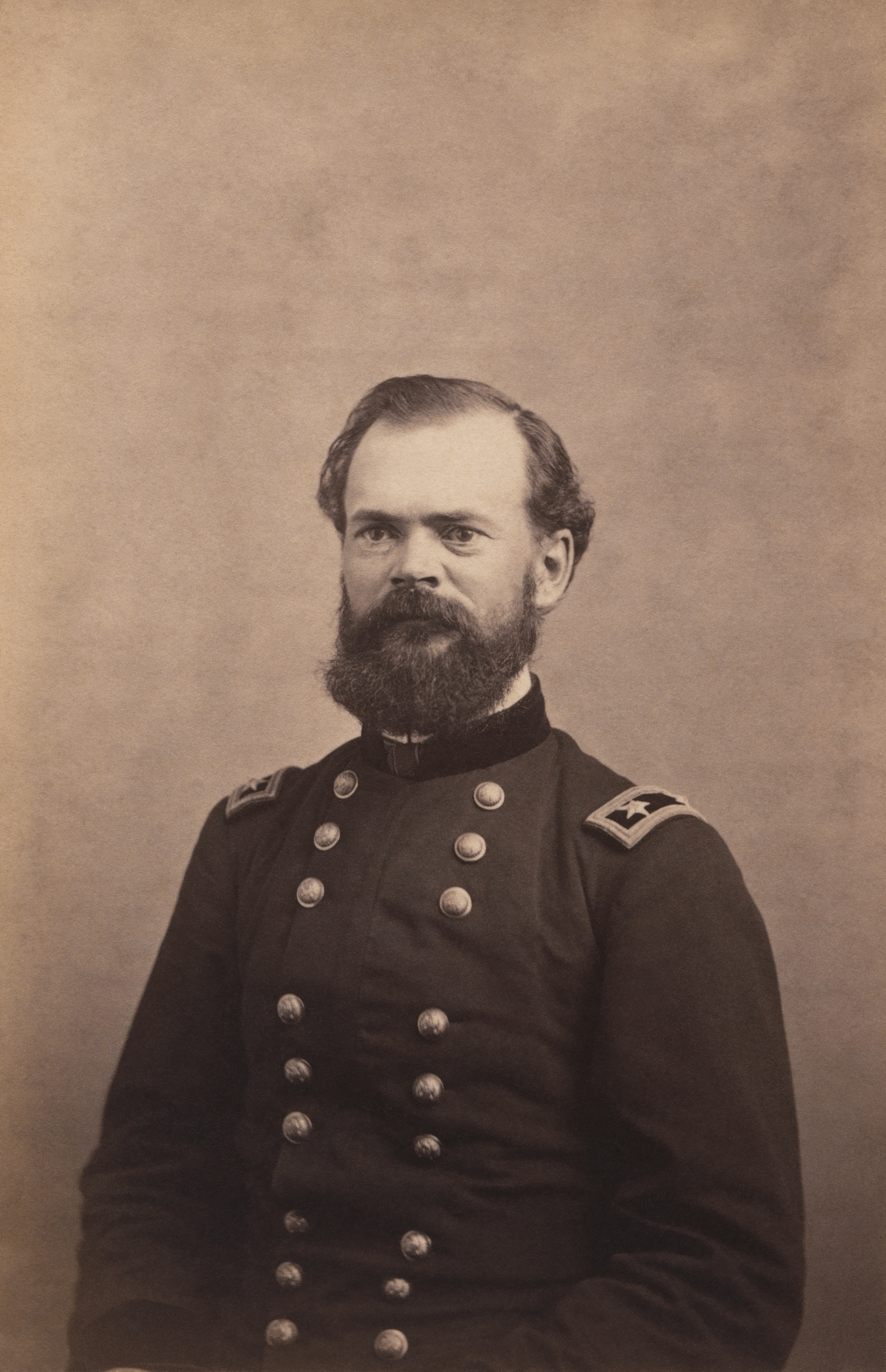
General James B. McPherson

The fighting opened on the morning of May 12, when the leading Union troops, a cavalry force, ran into skirmishers sent out by Granbury. The Union troops were surprised to meet resistance, and skirmishing began at a range of about 100 yards (90 m). Gregg was informed by a scout that the Union force numbered only about 2,500 to 3,000 men; knowing that scouts frequently overestimated enemy strengths, this report confirmed Gregg's belief that he was facing at most a brigade. Bledsoe's cannons opened fire at the advancing Union troops, and Union artillery began firing as well. Which side opened the battle is not known. Smoke from the firing clouded the air and reduced the effectiveness of both sides' artillery. Around 09:00, McPherson realized that the Confederates in front of his force represented more than just skirmishers, and he began deploying for battle. McPherson used cavalry to cover his flanks and brought Brigadier General Elias Dennis's brigade of four regiments to the front. The six cannons of the 8th Michigan Light Artillery Battery were brought up to duel Bledsoe's Battery. Dennis's men forced the Confederates back and sent a skirmish line across the creek. The 3rd Ohio Battery also arrived on the scene, strengthening the Union line, which now had a twelve to three advantage in cannons. Union Brigadier General John E. Smith's five-regiment brigade of Logan's 6,500-man division arrived and attacked the Confederate line. Of Smith's regiments, only the 23rd Indiana Infantry Regiment was successfully able to cross the creek; the others became bogged down in the heavy undergrowth near the creek.

With the Union troops concentrated on a single road, Gregg decided to pull his troops closer together and attack. His plan was for the 7th Texas and the 3rd Tennessee to attack en echelon. The 50th Tennessee and 10th and 30th Tennessee (Consolidated) were to move off of the Gallatin Road and strike the Union line in the flank, which Gregg expected to be exposed. Between the two regiments, Gregg's flanking force was composed of roughly 1,200 men. Gregg also hoped the two flanking units could capture McPherson's artillery, as he was concerned that the Union's artillery advantage would eventually silence Bledsoe's guns. Gregg's Texans hit the 20th Ohio Infantry Regiment and the 68th Ohio Infantry Regiment hard. The former regiment held, but the latter broke for the rear. The Union line began to buckle, but it was rallied by the division commander Major General John A. Logan. McPherson, in his inexperience, overestimated the strength of the Confederate force he was facing. The 3rd Tennessee counterattacked the Indianans, who were driven back across the creek and reformed beside the 20th Ohio and the 20th Illinois Infantry Regiment. The attacking Tennesseans shifted to the southeast and advanced towards the 45th Illinois Infantry Regiment. Gregg brought the 41st Tennessee up from the reserve, but he did not have the Union line scouted and was thus uninformed of its true strength. Heavy smoke and dust limited Gregg's ability to see the battle, and events began to escape his control.

=== Chaotic escalation ===
A third Union brigade, under the command of Brigadier General John D. Stevenson, had held back in the rear due to dust clouds kicked up by Smith's brigade. As the battle grew in intensity, Stevenson began moving his men to a position behind the 8th Michigan Battery but was initially held back until Confederate intentions became clearer. The brigade was then ordered by McPherson to support Dennis and Smith after the Confederate attack hit. Stevenson's four regiments were split up, two being sent to support Smith and Dennis, and the others moving to shore up the Union right flank. The latter movement meant that Gregg's two flanking regiments would not strike an exposed Union position. When some of the men of the 50th Tennessee opened fire on the Union line, the element of surprise was lost. The unit's commander tried to inform Gregg that the Union force was much larger than expected, but the messenger could not find him. The 50th Tennessee fell back to a defensive position without informing other Confederate units. The commander of the 10th and 30th Tennessee (Consolidated) had orders not to engage until after the 50th Tennessee had entered the fighting. Gregg's flank attack had stalled, one unit hanging out of the fighting and the other waiting for the former to enter the battle.

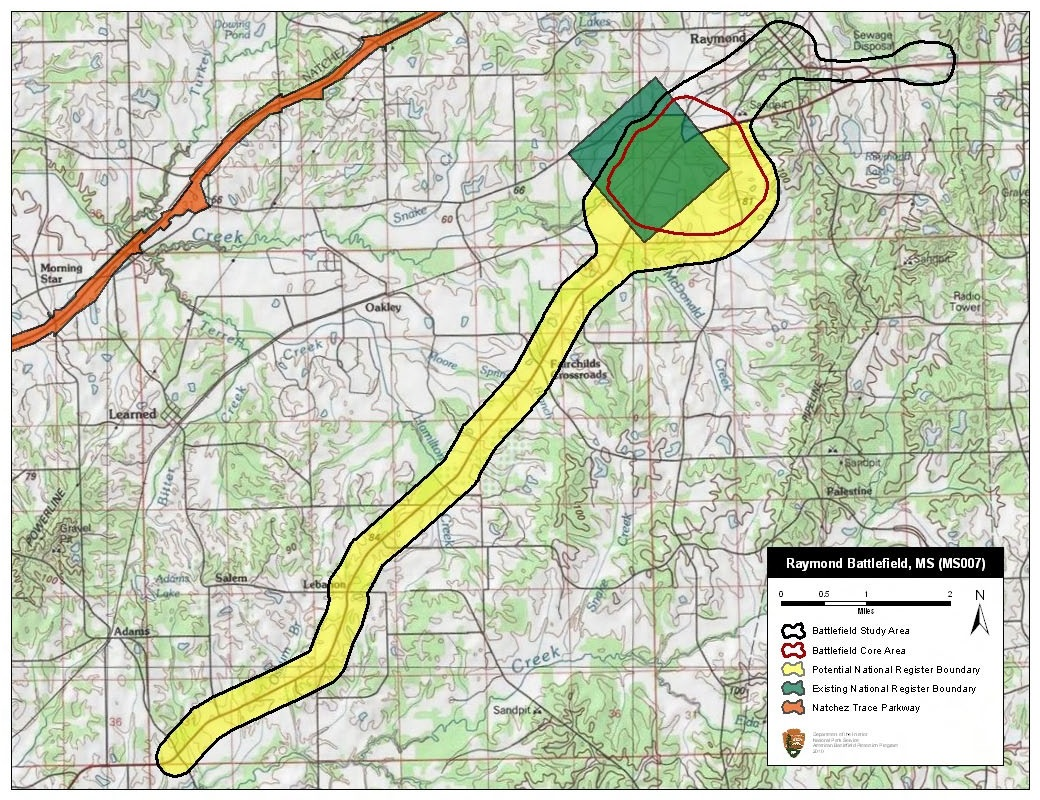
Map of Raymond Battlefield core and study areas by the American Battlefield Protection Program

On the other end of the Confederate line, an attack by the 20th Illinois drove back the 7th Texas. At this point in the fighting, the lines had realigned so that the Union troops held the 125 yards (114 m) of the creek east of the bridge and fired north. On the other side of a curve in the creek, the Confederates held 100 yards (91 m) and fired south. Meanwhile, the 3rd Tennessee continued to advance, expecting that its left flank would be covered by the 50th Tennessee. With the latter unit not in position, the 3rd Tennessee's flank was exposed to fire from the 31st Illinois Infantry Regiment. Union troops counterattacked the 3rd Tennessee with four regiments and drove it back after a 45-minute fight, only to be staved off by the 41st Tennessee. The 20th Ohio also attacked the 7th Texas. The Confederate unit retreated and split in two, some falling back to the 1st Tennessee Battalion and the rest to the 10th and 30th Tennessee (Consolidated). More Union artillery arrived on the field when four 24-pounder howitzers from Battery D, 1st Illinois Light Artillery deployed.

The battle was growing chaotic due to thick undergrowth and clouds of smoke, and units on both sides fought more and more individuals with less direction from high-ranking officers. At 13:30, a brigade from Union Brigadier General Marcellus M. Crocker's division, commanded by Colonel John B. Sanborn, arrived on the field and moved to support Logan's left flank. Two regiments from Crocker's division were also sent to aid Smith and Stevenson, as the 7th Texas was withdrawing. A Union regimental commander determined that the two new regiments were not needed, and the reinforcements took up a reserve position. The 50th Tennessee and the 10th and 30th Tennessee (Consolidated) prepared to advance together, but they paused to await further orders. The expected orders did not arrive, and the latter unit moved to the right, breaking contact between the two units. The men of the 50th Tennessee heard the sound of heavy fighting to their right, and they began to take fire from this direction. The unit then fell back to the position it had occupied in the morning. The 10th and 30th Tennessee (Consolidated), having either been ordered by Gregg towards the center of the line to shore up the exposed flank of the 3rd Tennessee, or been driven by Union troops towards that position, moved to a point in the line near where the 3rd Tennessee was fighting Smith's men. The new deployment left a gap between the 10th and 30th Tennessee (Consolidated) and the 41st Tennessee.

=== Union breakthrough ===
McPherson was able to bring up 22 cannons onto the field, and some of his men forced their way across the creek, making contact with the 50th Tennessee. The Union artillery began to fire on the exposed 10th and 30th Tennessee (Consolidated). Knowing a retreat would break the Confederate line and that his men would suffer casualties if they remained steady, the unit's commander, Colonel Randal William MacGavock, ordered an attack against the 7th Missouri Infantry Regiment, which had recently crossed the creek. MacGavock was killed early in the charge, but his men could drive the Missourians back before being halted by fire from the 31st Illinois and the rallied Missourians. A counterattack drove them back to their starting point, but an attempt by the Missouri regiment to gain further ground was repulsed. Gregg did not know that his left flank was held by the 50th Tennessee, and he ordered the 41st Tennessee in this direction. At the same time, the 50th Tennessee had begun moving on its own to the right, where the sounds of battle were coming from; the two regiments essentially switched places.

The weight of superior Union numbers was beginning to tell. Gregg determined that a retreat was necessary, and he ordered the 1st Tennessee Battalion to feign an attack against Crocker's men, covering the withdrawal of the spent 7th Texas and 3rd Tennessee. The Union troops fell for the bluff and withdrew, allowing the 1st Tennessee Battalion to cover the Confederate retreat. The 10th and 30th Tennessee (Consolidated) began to withdraw on its own, but then it attacked a Union regiment from Ohio, only to be driven back by stronger Union forces. The 50th Tennessee either moved to the Utica Road during the retreat and covered it while falling back or withdrew via the Gallatin Road. Six companies of the 3rd Kentucky Mounted Infantry Regiment arrived on the field unexpectedly, and they helped cover the retreat. The retreat occurred over two roads, and Gregg's men fell back through the town of Raymond and onto the road to Jackson, before stopping for the night in some woods near a local cemetery. They were joined by 1,000 men under the command of Brigadier General W. H. T. Walker that evening. Fighting ended around 16:00, and Union soldiers entered Raymond where they found and consumed a meal of fried chicken and lemonade that area women had prepared for Gregg's men, expecting a Confederate victory. Gregg's men abandoned their wounded and fell back to Jackson the next day; McPherson did not pursue, citing the difficulty of the terrain. The Union forces were also very disorganized. Anne Martin, a civilian resident of Raymond, reported that the Union soldiers occupying the town looted her house, and she wrote a letter to a family member stating that she had heard sounds of similar destruction from elsewhere in the town.

== Aftermath ==
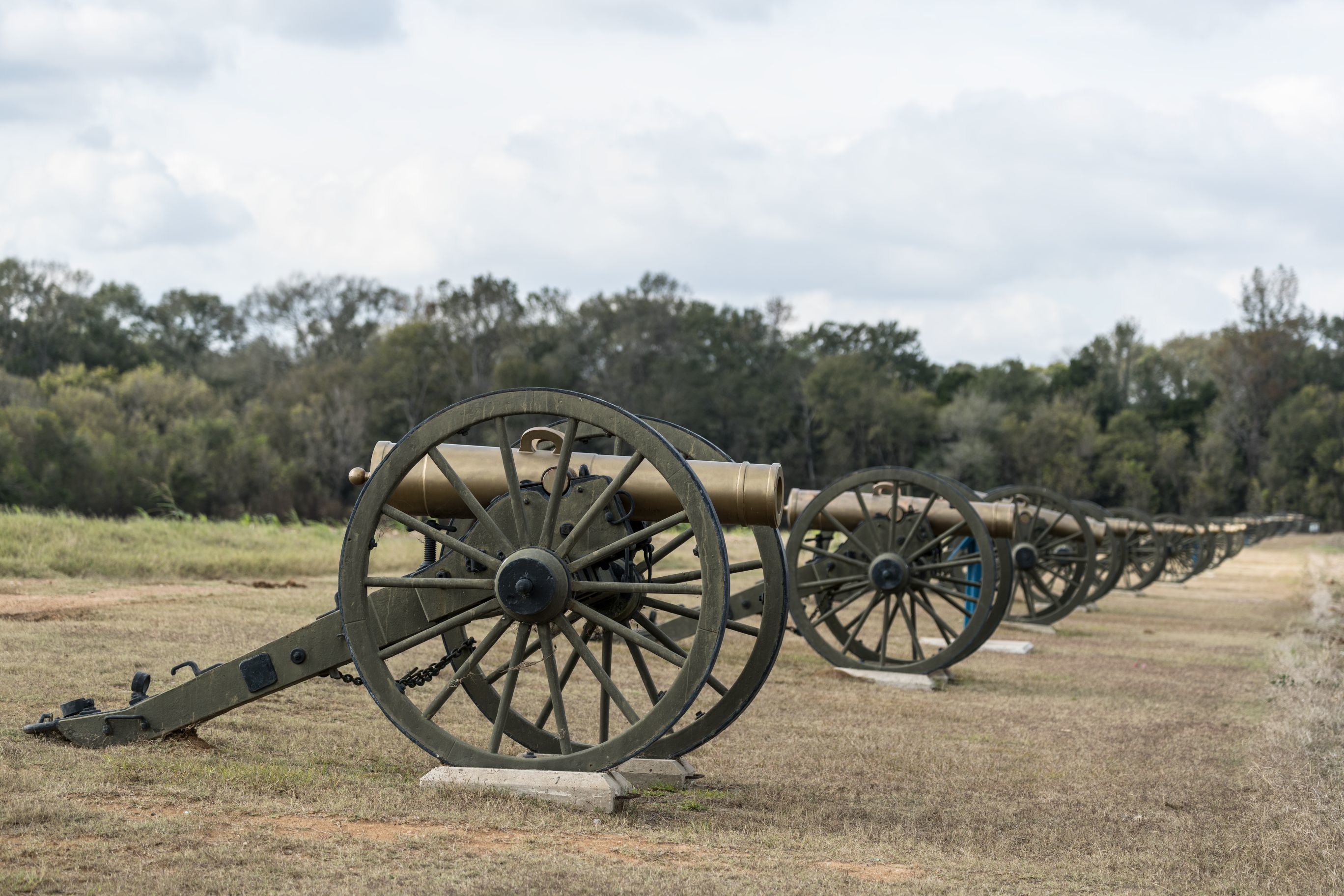
Photograph of cannons at the Raymond battlefield by Carol Highsmith

Reports of Union casualties vary between 442 and 446. The historians William L. Shea and Terrence J. Winschel supported the latter number and broke down casualties as 68 killed, 341 wounded, and 37 missing; Donald L. Miller agreed with this total, as did the historian Timothy B. Smith. The former figure was given by the historian Michael B. Ballard. in one work, Ed Bearss gave the total as 442 with a breakdown of 66 killed, 339 wounded, and 37 missing, although he also supported the 446 figure in a different work. Confederate losses were reported as either 514, with a breakdown of 72 killed, 252 wounded, and 190 missing, or 515 with the extra loss being another man killed. Another statement of Confederate casualties was provided by McPherson, who claimed to have captured 720 Confederates and found another 103 slain on the field. Smith attributed the 515 figure to Gregg's post-battle report, and notes that the casualty figures were later updated by a small amount. He also stated that it is likely the exact number of casualties suffered during the battle will never be known. Confederate losses were heaviest in the 3rd Tennessee and the 7th Texas. In addition to the human casualties, the Confederates lost one of Bledsoe's cannons, which burst during the fighting. Union wounded were treated in field hospitals set up in local churches; a Confederate field hospital was run inside the Hinds County courthouse. Union losses represented about three percent of McPherson's force, while Gregg lost about sixteen percent of his.

The fight at Raymond demonstrated to Grant that the Confederate force in Jackson was stronger than he had believed, leading him to decide that the Confederates there must be neutralized to allow him to attack Vicksburg without the risk of being caught between two Confederate armies. Thinking that McPherson's corps was insufficient to take Jackson on its own, Grant decided to bring his whole army to bear against the city, abandoning a previous plan to turn west and cross the Big Black River at Edwards and Bolton. The previously planned movement was viewed as too risky with Johnston and the Jackson garrison left in the Union army's rear, especially as McClernand's men had also encountered part of Pemberton's force elsewhere simultaneously as the battle at Raymond. McClernand was ordered to move to Raymond, McPherson was to head northeast to Clinton and then strike Jackson, and Sherman was to approach the place from the southwest. A successful action against Jackson had the potential to remove its value as a Confederate reinforcement center and clear the area of Confederate troops. From Pemberton's perspective, a Union movement against Jackson had the ability to sever the key railroad supply lines to Vicksburg. As a result, the Confederates would need to defeat Grant in open battle outside of the defenses of Vicksburg, and Pemberton's army moved east for this purpose. Johnston had issued an order for Pemberton's force to join with his at Clinton, but this was not possible due to Union control of the area.

On May 14, the Union army attacked Jackson. Johnston withdrew his men from the city, Gregg performing rear guard duty. Grant's army then turned west and encountered Pemberton's men, who were attempting to make a stand east of Vicksburg. On May 16, Pemberton's men were defeated at the Battle of Champion Hill, and after a defeat in a rearguard action at the Battle of Big Black River Bridge the next day they withdrew into the Vicksburg defenses. Union attempts to take the city by direct assault on May 19 and 22 failed, and Grant placed Vicksburg under siege. Supplies within the city eventually ran low, and with no hope of escape Pemberton surrendered the city and his army to Grant on July 4, ending the siege of Vicksburg. The capture of Vicksburg was a critical point in the war.

== Assessment ==
Bearss describes McPherson's handling of the battle as "not a success" and as "far too cautious or, perhaps worse, timid", citing his piecemeal deployment of his troops and ineffective use of his artillery advantage. Miller also states that McPherson mismanaged the battle and called the decision not to pursue a mistake. Ballard concludes that McPherson had not formed an overall plan of command, instead just feeding troops into the fight and leaving tactical decisions to junior commanders. Ballard attributes the Union victory to numerical advantage, rather than McPherson's generalship. Smith writes that "McPherson did not earn high marks for the handling of his corps" and criticizes him for allowing the Confederates to have the tactical initiative for most of the fighting and for failing to properly coordinate his troops. He also believes that the Union general should have had plans for a pursuit. Bearss also criticizes Gregg for being too aggressive and failing to ascertain the strength of the force he was facing. Conversely, Smith believes that Gregg "demonstrated real ability" in planning, use of discretion, and inspiring his men. Alternatively, writer Kevin Dougherty attributes the Confederate defeat to Gregg's failure to gain an accurate assessment of McPherson's strength and the nature of the battlefield situation.

== Battlefield preservation ==
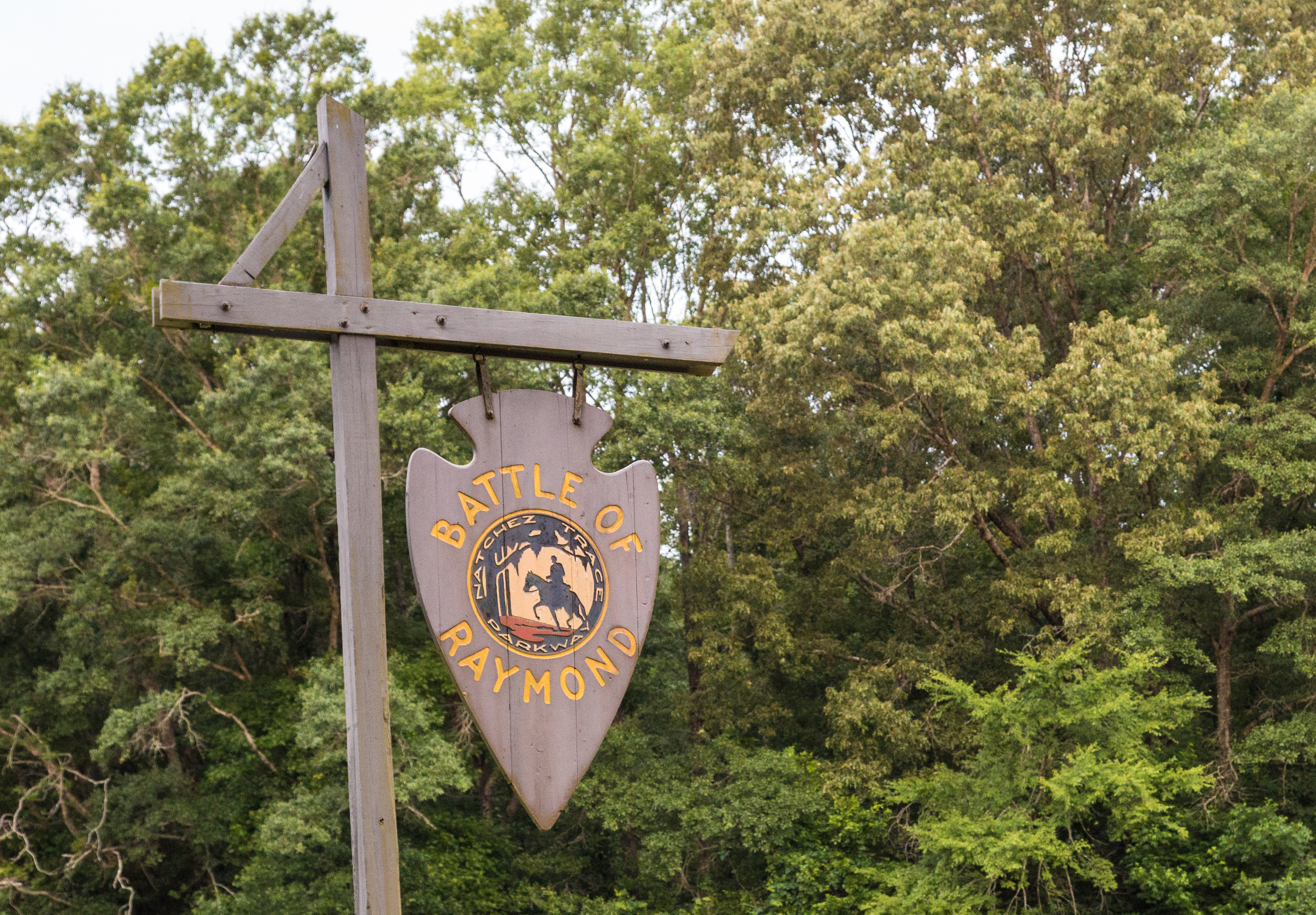
Battle of Raymond historic site on the Natchez Trace Parkway near Raymond, Mississippi

The site of the battle was listed on the National Register of Historic Places (NRHP) on January 13, 1972, as the Raymond Battlefield Site. The 1971 NRHP application form stated that the battlefield had been altered but was still in good condition. At that time, the site had both publicly and privately owned elements and had restricted access. Parts of the battlefield were used for agricultural, residential, industrial, or transportation purposes. Two iterations of Mississippi Highway 18 cut through the field. Construction of the newer iteration had required disinterring Confederate dead from a burial trench. The battlefield location of Bledsoe's battery had been covered over by an industrial facility, and the road to Utica was overgrown and no longer in use. The listing encompassed 1,440 acres (580 ha) of the battlefield, but only about 936 acres (379 ha) were still listed in 2010.

The Battle of Raymond was one of sixteen Civil War battle sites studied by the Civil War Sites Advisory Commission (CWSAC) in Mississippi. In 1993, a CWSAC study ranked the Raymond battlefield as in the tier of highest priority for protection. A reenactment of the battle took place on the site in 2001. In 2010, the site received another study, this time from the American Battlefield Protection Program (ABPP). The ABPP study focused on 5,643.83 acres (2,283.98 ha) and deemed that 4,467.02 acres (1,807.74 ha) of them were potentially eligible for NRHP listing. As of 2010, about 79 percent of the battlefield at Raymond was still considered intact, including the Union artillery position, Fourteenmile Creek, and part of the Utica Road. The Friends of Raymond group manages 135 acres (55 ha) of the site as the Raymond Military Park, providing public interpretation. As of 2010, the interpretation included a walking trail and signage. In December 2020, the Mississippi Department of Archives and History received a grant to purchase 43.71 acres (17.69 ha) at Raymond; the land covered by the grant connects tracts of land already publicly preserved.

Since 2001, The American Battlefield Trust and its partners, including the Friends of Raymond group, have preserved more than 149 acres of the battlefield through mid-2023.

== Sources ==
- Ballard, Michael B. (2004). Vicksburg: The Campaign that Opened the Mississippi. Chapel Hill, North Carolina: University of North Carolina Press. ISBN 0-8078-2893-9.
- Bearss, Edwin C. (1998). "Port Gibson, Mississippi". In Kennedy, Frances H. (ed.). The Civil War Battlefield Guide (2nd ed.). Boston/New York: Houghton Mifflin. pp. 158–164. ISBN 978-0-395-74012-5.
- Bearss, Edwin C. (1998). "Raymond, Mississippi". In Kennedy, Frances H. (ed.). The Civil War Battlefield Guide (2nd ed.). Boston/New York: Houghton Mifflin. pp. 164–167. ISBN 978-0-395-74012-5.
- Bearss, Edwin C. (1998). "Champion Hill, Mississippi". In Kennedy, Frances H. (ed.). The Civil War Battlefield Guide (2nd ed.). Boston/New York: Houghton Mifflin. pp. 171–173. ISBN 978-0-395-74012-5.
- Bearss, Edwin C. (1998). "Battle and Siege of Vicksburg, Mississippi". In Kennedy, Frances H. (ed.). The Civil War Battlefield Guide (2nd ed.). Boston/New York: Houghton Mifflin. pp. 164–167. ISBN 978-0-395-74012-5.
- Bearss, Edwin C. (2007) [2006]. Fields of Honor. Washington, D.C.: National Geographic. ISBN 978-1-4262-0093-9.
- Carter, Samuel (1980). The Final Fortress: The Campaign for Vicksburg 1862–1863. New York: St. Martin's Press. ISBN 0-312-83926-X.
- Dougherty, Kevin (2011). The Campaigns for Vicksburg 1862–1863: Leadership Lessons. Philadelphia, Pennsylvania: Casemate. ISBN 978-1-61200-014-5.
- Foote, Shelby (1995) [1963]. The Beleaguered City: The Vicksburg Campaign (Modern Library ed.). New York: The Modern Library. ISBN 0-679-60170-8.
- Goodman, Al W. (September 1997). "Brutal Battle of Raymond". America's Civil War. 10 (4). ISSN 1046-2899.
- Grabau, Warren (2000). Ninety-eight Days: A Geographer's View of the Vicksburg Campaign. Knoxville, Tennessee: University of Tennessee Press. ISBN 978-1-57233-068-9.
- Grabau, Warren (2001). Confusion Compounded: The Pivotal Battle of Raymond 12 May 1863. Danville, Virginia: Blue and Gray Education Society. OCLC 51759491.
- Groom, Winston (2009). Vicksburg 1863. New York: Vintage Books. ISBN 978-0-307-27677-3.
- Hills, J. Parker (2013). "Roads to Raymond". In Woodworth, Stephen E.; Grear, Charles D. (eds.). The Vicksburg Campaign: March 29–May 18, 1863 (ebook ed.). Carbondale, Illinois: Southern Illinois University Press. pp. 65–95. ISBN 978-0-8093-3270-0.
- Kennedy, Frances H., ed. (1998). The Civil War Battlefield Guide (2nd ed.). Boston/New York: Houghton Mifflin. ISBN 978-0-395-74012-5.
- Miller, Donald L. (2019). Vicksburg: Grant's Campaign that Broke the Confederacy. New York, New York: Simon and Schuster. ISBN 978-1-4516-4139-4.
- Update to the Civil War Sites Advisory Commission Report on the Nation's Civil War Battlefields: State of Mississippi (PDF). Washington, D. C.: National Park Service. October 2010.
- Shea, William L.; Winschel, Terrence J. (2003). Vicksburg Is the Key: The Struggle for the Mississippi River. Lincoln, Nebraska: University of Nebraska Press. ISBN 978-0-8032-9344-1.
- Smith, Timothy B. (2012) [2006]. Champion Hill: Decisive Battle for Vicksburg. El Dorado Hills, California: Savas Beatie. ISBN 978-1-932714-19-7.
- Winschel, Terrence J. (1998). "Chickasaw Bayou, Mississippi". In Kennedy, Frances H. (ed.). The Civil War Battlefield Guide (2nd ed.). Boston/New York: Houghton Mifflin. pp. 154–156. ISBN 978-0-395-74012-5.
- Wright, William C. (June 18, 1971). National Register of Historic Places Inventory – Nomination Form (PDF). Mississippi Department of Archives and History.
