= Battle of Port Gibson =

Battle of the American Civil War

Coordinates: 31°57′21″N 91°01′22″W

- Part of the American Civil War
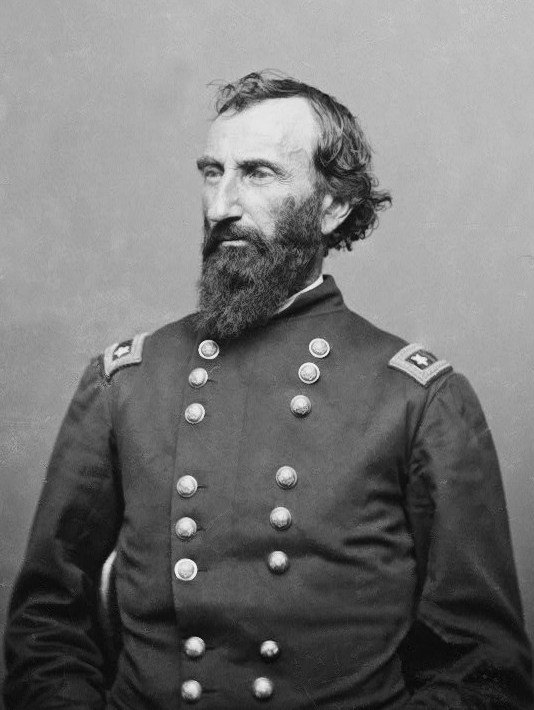
- Almost all of the fighting on the Union side was done by Major General John A. McClernand's corps.
Date	May 1, 1863
Location	Claiborne County, near Port Gibson, Mississippi
Result	Union victory

Belligerents
United States (Union)	(Confederate States of America) CSA (Confederacy)

Commanders and leaders
Ulysses S. Grant; John A. McClernand	John C. Pemberton; John S. Bowen

Units involved
Army of the Tennessee: XIII Corps (4 divisions); XVII Corps (1 division)	Army of Mississippi: 4 brigades

Strength
23,000	8,000

Casualties and losses
875	787, 4 guns

The Battle of Port Gibson (May 1, 1863) was fought between a Union Army commanded by Major General Ulysses S. Grant and a reinforced Confederate States Army division led by Major General John S. Bowen. Though the outnumbered Confederate soldiers fought stubbornly, they were steadily pressed back during the day by Major General John A. McClernand's troops. Bowen eventually conceded the field by withdrawing north toward Vicksburg, Mississippi. The battle occurred near Port Gibson, Mississippi, during the Vicksburg Campaign of the American Civil War.

Starting in November 1862, Grant tried various strategies in order to attack Vicksburg, and in each case, his army was unsuccessful. Finally, Grant ordered his army to march through swampy terrain on the west bank of the Mississippi River in an attempt to get south of Vicksburg. The Union commander gambled that the Union Navy under Acting Rear Admiral David Dixon Porter could safely pass the Vicksburg batteries. The operation was successful, and Porter's gunboats and river transports carried the first two army corps of Grant's army to the east bank. Meanwhile, Grant's third corps threatened Vicksburg from the northwest. The Confederate commander Lieutenant General John C. Pemberton was caught with his army scattered and could only oppose Grant with inferior forces at Port Gibson. This was the first of several Union victories in May 1863 that would result in the Siege of Vicksburg.

== Background ==
=== Campaign ===
Grant assumed command of the Army of the Tennessee on October 25, 1862, and started the Vicksburg campaign a week later. Grant's first foray with 40,000 soldiers came to grief when Major General Earl Van Dorn's cavalry wrecked his supply base in the Holly Springs Raid on December 20. At the same time, a 32,000-man riverine expedition led by Major General William Tecumseh Sherman was repulsed at the Battle of Chickasaw Bayou on December 27–29. When McClernand arrived to assume command, Sherman suggested a thrust up the Arkansas River supported by Porter's Mississippi River Squadron. The result was a Union victory at the Battle of Arkansas Post on January 11, 1863. For a Federal loss of 1,061 casualties, about 4,900 Confederates were captured. When Grant learned about the divergent expedition, he ordered the troops back to the Mississippi River.

These events were followed by the unsuccessful Yazoo Pass and Steele's Bayou expeditions in March 1863. Grant also tried to dig several canals to create a water-borne route west of the Mississippi River that would avoid the Vicksburg batteries; all were eventually abandoned. When newspaper editors and politicians demanded Grant's removal from command, President Abraham Lincoln replied, "I can't spare this man, he fights". Earlier in the campaign, Lieutenant Colonel James H. Wilson of Grant's staff suggested having Porter's fleet run past the Vicksburg batteries at night. After this, the army would march downstream from Vicksburg on the west bank of the Mississippi River and be ferried across to the east bank. All of Grant's subordinate commanders were against it. Having tried every other approach, Grant determined to execute this plan. He gambled that Porter's squadron could accomplish its part.

=== Forces ===
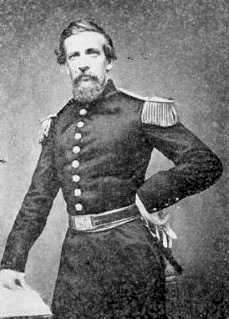
John S. Bowen

The Union XIII Corps was formed on October 24, 1862, and assigned to Grant. On December 18, the XIII Corps was split into four new formations: XIII Corps, XV Corps, XVI Corps, and XVII Corps. The commanders were McClernand for the XIII Corps, Sherman for the XV Corps, Major General Stephen A. Hurlbut for the XVI Corps, and Major General James B. McPherson for the, XVII Corps. Hurlbut's XVI Corps guarded Memphis, Tennessee, until June 1863, leaving the other three corps as Grant's field army. McClernand's corps numbered over 17,000 men, McPherson's counted 16,000 soldiers, and Sherman's corps had slightly under 17,000 troops. The four XIII Corps divisions were led by Brigadier Generals Peter J. Osterhaus, Andrew Jackson Smith, Alvin P. Hovey, and Eugene Asa Carr. The three XV Corps divisions were commanded by Brigadier Generals Frederick Steele, Francis Preston Blair Jr., and James M. Tuttle. The three XVII Corps divisions were led by Major General John A. Logan and Brigadier Generals John McArthur and Marcellus M. Crocker. The XIII Corps divisions had two brigades each while the XV and XVII Corps divisions had three brigades each.

Pemberton took command of the Department of Mississippi and East Louisiana on October 14, 1862. Pemberton's Army of Mississippi consisted of five infantry divisions. These were led by Bowen and Major Generals Martin Luther Smith, John Horace Forney, William Wing Loring, and Carter L. Stevenson. Bowen's division had 4,500 soldiers, Smith's had 3,500, Forney's had 5,500, Loring's had 7,800, and Stevenson's had 12,000. Pemberton also controlled the artillery batteries at Vicksburg under Colonel Edward Higgins.

=== Operations ===
Grant's Operations against Vicksburg Confederate Union

On March 29, 1863, Grant ordered McClernand's XIII Corps to move south from Milliken's Bend to New Carthage which was south of the fortifications at Vicksburg and Warrenton. Osterhaus' division occupied Richmond, Louisiana, on March 31. Brushing aside a few hundred Confederates led by Major Isaac F. Harrison, Osterhaus' troops moved through swampy terrain along Roundaway Bayou and occupied New Carthage on April 6. McClernand continued shifting his corps to New Carthage, which entailed repairing broken levees and corduroying the muddy roads. On April 15, Harrison, reinforced by 1,800 of Pemberton's soldiers, tried to evict the Federals from New Carthage but failed.

On the night of April 16, 1863, Porter's squadron began its attempt to pass Vicksburg. Porter in the ironclad USS Benton led the warships USS Carondelet, USS Lafayette, USS Louisville, USS Mound City, USS Pittsburgh, and USS Tuscumbia, and three river transports towing barges loaded with supplies. For two hours, the Vicksburg batteries shelled the Union fleet, hitting each vessel numerous times. However, except for one transport which caught fire and burned, the vessels were not seriously damaged and only 14 men were wounded. Grant ordered McPherson to move the XVII Corps south from Lake Providence to Richmond. Once the XVII Corps was south of Vicksburg, Sherman's XV Corps would follow. Supply depots on the west bank of the Mississippi River were garrisoned by hastily recruited and trained African American soldiers led by white officers.

Grant realized that it was impossible to supply his army via the muddy west bank road, so a second convoy was organized. On the night of April 22, six unescorted transport vessels, each towing barges with 100,000 rations and other supplies, tried to pass the Vicksburg batteries. Again, the run was successful, except that the leading vessel, a hospital ship, was sunk and 2 men were killed. Meanwhile, by cutting a new road through the swamp, when necessary, McClernand's corps worked its way south and was joined by one of McPherson's divisions. McClernand, who brought his new bride along, and who was difficult to work with, had to be prodded by Grant.

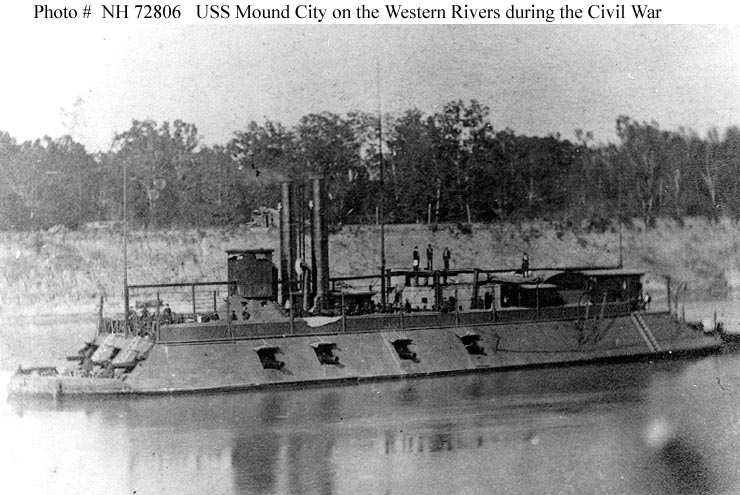
Ironclad USS Mound City

Grant ordered Porter and McClernand to force a crossing at Grand Gulf, Mississippi. On the morning of April 29, McClernand put his troops aboard transports at Hard Times Plantation and waited for Porter's gunboats to reduce the Confederate strongpoint. Five hours later, the Battle of Grand Gulf ended in a Confederate victory when Porter's vessels withdrew after losing 19 killed and 56 wounded. McClernand unloaded his soldiers and marched them south to De Shroon's plantation. That night, Porter's gunboats and the transports ran the Grand Gulf batteries and joined McClernand's men at De Shroon's.

Grant reasoned that Pemberton would discern the Union army's southward movement. Therefore, Grant mounted three diversionary operations in April 1863. The first was Steele's Greenville expedition from April 2 to 25. Steele marched his division to Greenville, Mississippi, and when Stevenson's Confederate division opposed it, Steele withdrew to the Mississippi River. The second was Grierson's Raid which lasted from April 17 to May 2. Colonel Benjamin H. Grierson's brigade of cavalry rode from La Grange, Tennessee, right across the state of Mississippi to Baton Rouge, Louisiana. Loring's division and much of Pemberton's cavalry were diverted in a futile attempt to catch Grierson's horsemen. The third was the Battle of Snyder's Bluff from April 29 to May 1, when elements of Sherman's XV Corps mounted a demonstration north of Vicksburg in order to draw Pemberton's attention away from Grant's imminent crossing.

== Battle ==
=== Prelude ===
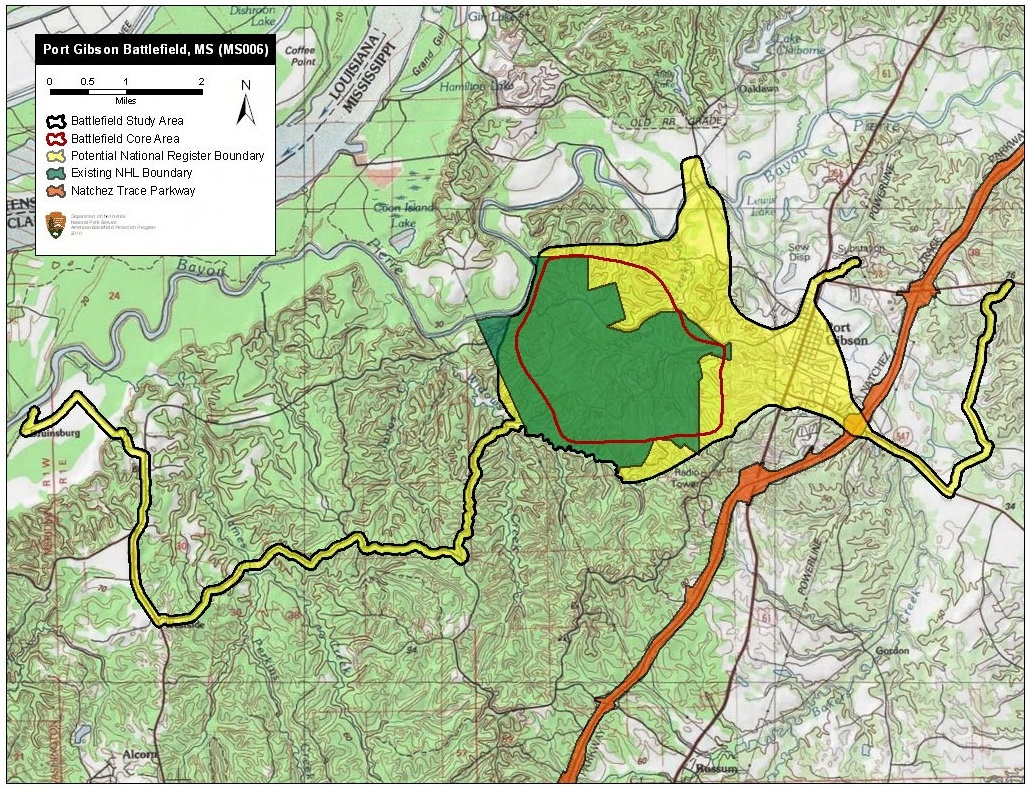
Map of Port Gibson Battlefield core and study areas by the American Battlefield Protection Program

Grant got information from a slave that a good road headed inland from Bruinsburg, which was 10 mi (16.1 km) downstream from Grand Gulf. On the morning of April 30, the Union soldiers embarked on transports at De Shroon's and crossed unopposed to the east bank of the Mississippi River at Bruinsburg. Porter's gunboats were also employed to ferry the troops across the river. By 3:00 pm, McClernand's corps was marching inland. Grant later wrote, "I was now in enemy territory, with a vast river and the stronghold of Vicksburg between me and my base of supplies. But I was on dry ground on the same side of the river with the enemy. All the campaigns, labors, hardships, and exposures of December previous to this time that had been made and endured, were for the accomplishment of this one object."

Bowen's division was at Grand Gulf where he had just seen Porter's gunboats pass to the south. Bowen ordered a brigade under Brigadier General Martin E. Green to Port Gibson in order to picket the roads leading inland. His ability to mount a reconnaissance was handicapped by the fact that most of the Confederate cavalry was far away chasing Grierson's raiders. Bowen expected to be reinforced by brigades led by Brigadier Generals Edward D. Tracy and William Edwin Baldwin, but they had not arrived at Grand Gulf by the morning of April 30. Tracy's brigade was part of Stevenson's division and Baldwin's was from M. L. Smith's division.

McClernand's corps kept marching after dark on April 30 and advanced unopposed for 7 mi (11.3 km). Two roads in the area led from the river before converging at Port Gibson, the northern Bruinsburg road and the southern Rodney road. After gathering information from local Black people, McClernand sidled his troops over to the Rodney road. Leading McClernand's column, Carr's division came into contact with Confederates near the Shaifer house about midnight and paused its march. Green deployed his brigade farther east at Magnolia Church on the Rodney road. Tracy's brigade arrived at 10:00 pm and took position farther north athwart the Bruinsburg road.

=== May 1 action ===
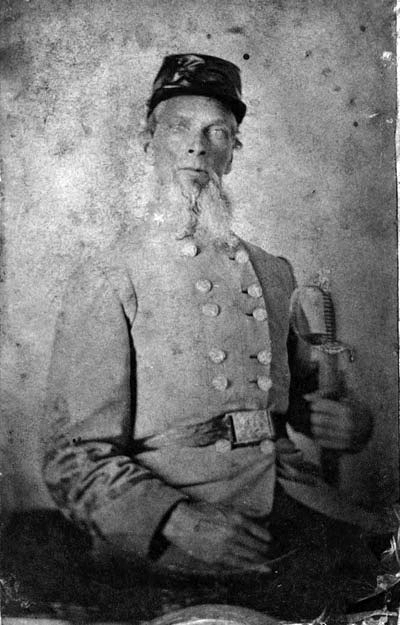
Martin E. Green

The area where the battle was fought favored the defenders. It consisted of flat-topped ridges and steep ravines. The ridge-tops were cleared of trees while the ravines were choked with dense vegetation. Any off-road movement was very difficult to accomplish. Between the Bruinsburg and Rodney roads ran Centers Creek which was almost impassable. The only way for Bowen to communicate between his two wings was by a 4 mi (6.4 km) roundabout route. McClernand ordered Carr's division to attack east on the Rodney road toward Magnolia Church. Spotting Confederates to the north, McClernand directed Osterhaus to use a plantation road to move his division north against Tracy's brigade on the Bruinsburg road.

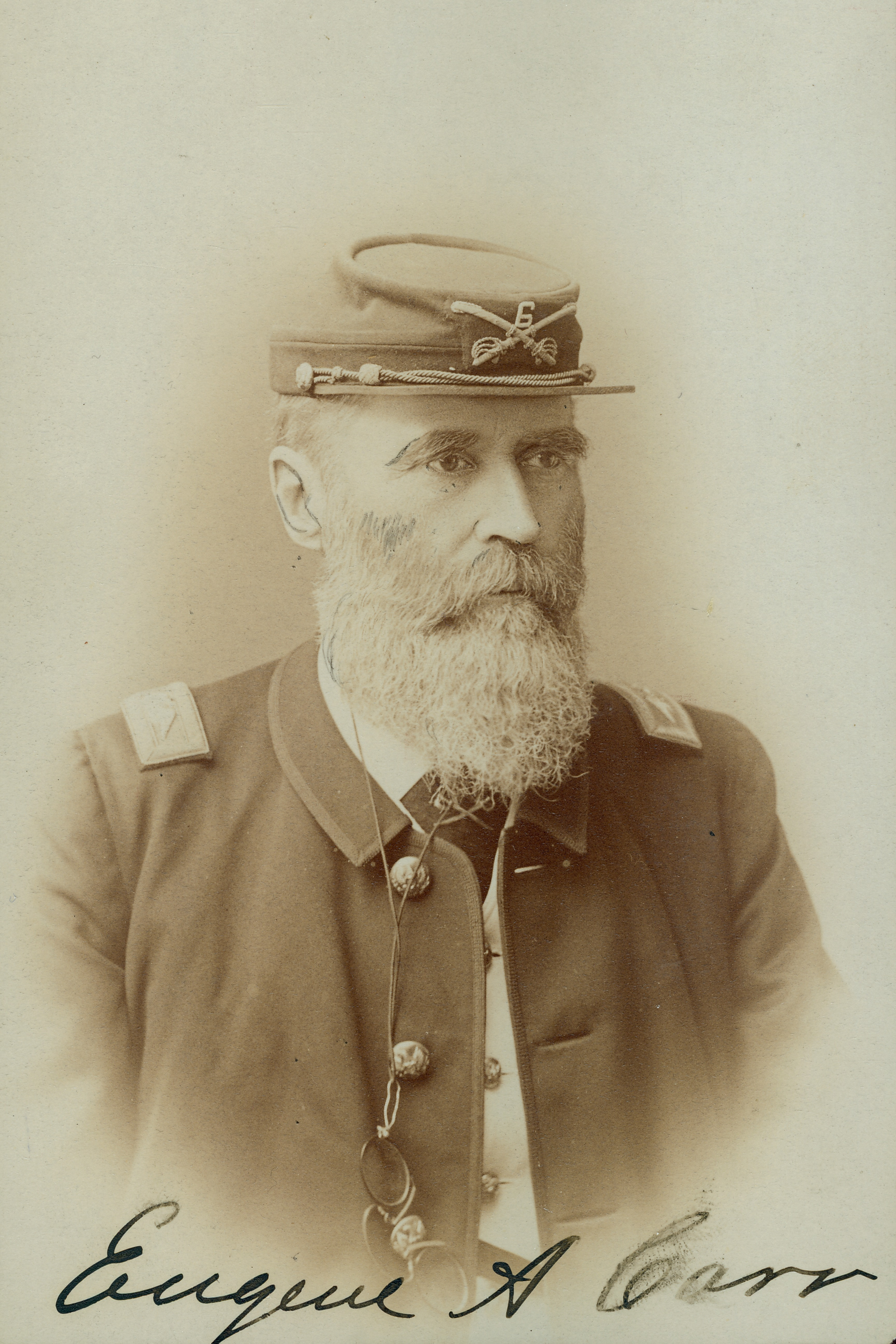
Eugene Asa Carr

Carr deployed his division with Brigadier General William Plummer Benton's brigade on the right and Colonel William M. Stone's brigade on the left of the Rodney road. When the Union line advanced at about 6:30 am, it turned Green's left flank and pressed the Confederates back a few hundred yards. At 7:00 am, Green sent a messenger to Tracy begging for help; Tracy responded by sending one infantry regiment and two artillery pieces. Bowen arrived at 7:30 am and found that Green had checked Carr's advance. Bowen sent for Colonel Francis Cockrell's brigade from his own division and Baldwin's brigade to come at once. At 8:30 am, Tracy's small reinforcements arrived; the infantry regiment was sent to Green's right flank while the two guns from the Botetourt Virginia Artillery were positioned at the Foster farm. Bowen ordered a counterattack, but it was beaten back.

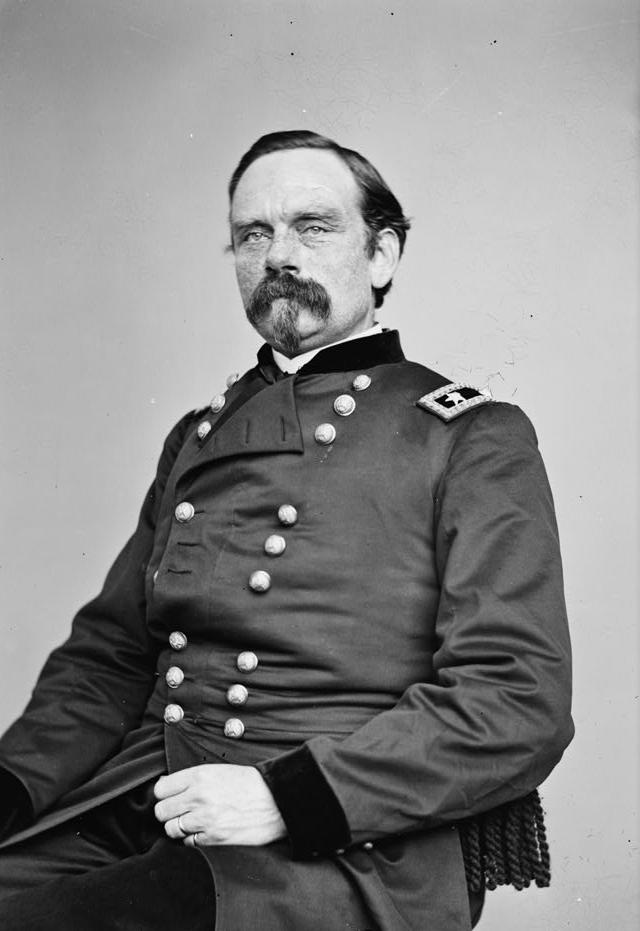
Peter J. Osterhaus

After a one-hour artillery duel in which the Federal guns dominated, Osterhaus ordered his infantry forward. He deployed Brigadier General Theophilus T. Garrard's brigade on the left and Colonel Lionel Allen Sheldon's brigade on the right of the plantation road. Tracy's soldiers stopped Osterhaus' men after a short advance through the confusing terrain. After reordering his lines, Osterhaus made a second attack which soon ground to a halt. Tracy was killed and Colonel Isham Warren Garrott assumed command of his brigade.

On the Rodney road, Carr's attack lost momentum and his two brigades became separated in the rough terrain, leaving a gap in the center of the line. McClernand inserted Hovey's division into the center. Hovey positioned Brigadier General George Francis McGinnis' brigade on the right and Colonel James R. Slack's brigade on the left. A. J. Smith's division was held in reserve. Two of Hovey's regiments were repulsed after uncoordinated attacks, but at 10:00 am McClernand managed to get all his front-line units to advance at once. Outflanked on left and right, Green's defense line collapsed and the Federals captured two 12-pounder howitzers and three artillery caissons from the Botetourt Artillery.

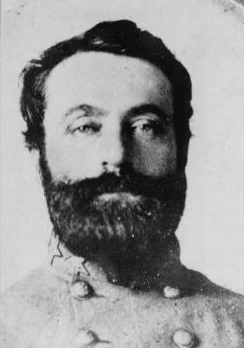
William E. Baldwin

At this time, Baldwin's brigade appeared on the Rodney road and took position behind a creek, about 1.5 mi (2.4 km) east of Green's second position. After Green rallied his brigade, Bowen directed him to march to assist Garrott's brigade on the Bruinsburg road. Grant and McClernand reorganized the Union forces and resumed the advance on the Rodney road at about noon. Carr's and Hovey's soldiers were still in the front line with A. J. Smith in support. At 1:20 pm, Bowen sent a telegraph message to Pemberton that he was outnumbered three-to-one, his ammunition was running out, and he was heavily engaged in combat.

On the Bruinsburg road, Osterhaus' troops turned Garrott's right flank. Garrott's right wing swung back so by 11:00 am, instead of facing south, the Confederate line faced west. Made cautious by the stout Confederate defense, Osterhaus limited his effort to probing attacks. At 2:00 pm, Green's exhausted survivors and one of Cockrell's regiments filed into line on Garrott's left flank. Brigadier General John E. Smith's brigade from Logan's division in McPherson's XVI Corps arrived and began pressing back Garrott's right flank. At 5:00 pm, Logan dispatched a second brigade led by Brigadier General Elias Smith Dennis. Just as the Union troops were ready to crush their opponents, they found the Confederates gone. Receiving an order from Bowen to retreat, Green's troops withdrew to the north, followed by Garrott's brigade.

On the Rodney road, the Union forces came up against Baldwin's defense line at 3:00 pm. McClernand deployed a second line made up of A. J. Smith's two brigades under Brigadier General Stephen G. Burbridge and Colonel William J. Landram, plus Logan's third brigade led by Brigadier General John Dunlap Stevenson. In this sector, the extreme Union left flank rested on Centers Creek while the extreme right was 2,000 yd (1,829 m) south. As the combat intensified, Bowen began to fear that his opponents might turn his left flank, so he summoned two of Cockrell's Missouri regiments that had just arrived. Bowen launched Cockrell's troops at the Union right flank. They rolled up two of Slack's regiments and engaged in a 40-minute firefight with superior Federal forces before pulling back. At 5:30 pm, Bowen ordered a retreat after seeing that his defenses were stretched to the breaking point. Cockrell withdrew to the north while Baldwin fell back to the east through Port Gibson.

== Aftermath ==
=== Casualties ===
Grant committed 23,000 men to battle and sustained losses of 131 killed, 719 wounded, and 25 missing, or 875 casualties. Bowen's 8,000 Confederates lost 60 killed, 340 wounded, and 387 missing, or 787 casualties. The Confederates also lost 4 artillery pieces.

Union losses at the Battle of Port Gibson
Corps	Division	Brigade	Killed	Wounded	Missing	Total
XIII	Peter J. Osterhaus (9th)	Theophilus T. Garrard	18	102	3	123
XIII	Peter J. Osterhaus (9th)	Lionel A. Sheldon	15	66	0	81
XIII	Andrew J. Smith (10th)	Stephen G. Burbridge	0	8	0	8
XIII	Andrew J. Smith (10th)	William J. Landram	2	21	8	31
XIII	Alvin P. Hovey (12th)	George F. McGinnis	30	187	1	218
XIII	Alvin P. Hovey (12th)	James R. Slack	16	62	11	89
XIII	Eugene A. Carr (14th)	William P. Benton	28	134	0	162
XIII	Eugene A. Carr (14th)	William M. Stone	13	88	0	101
XVII	John A. Logan (3rd)	John E. Smith	5	27	0	32
XVII	John A. Logan (3rd)	Elias S. Dennis	0	3	0	3
XVII	John A. Logan (3rd)	John D. Stevenson	1	8	2	11

Confederate losses at the Battle of Port Gibson
Division	Brigade	Killed	Wounded	Missing	Total
John S. Bowen	Francis Cockrell	13	97	96	206
John S. Bowen	Martin E. Green	17	83	122	222
Carter L. Stevenson	Edward D. Tracy	18	112	142	272
Martin L. Smith	William E. Baldwin	12	48	27	87

=== Results ===
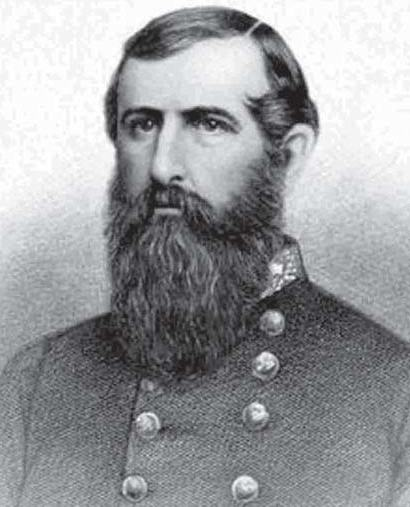
John Pemberton

There was no pursuit because the Union soldiers were completely worn out from the inland march and fighting all day. Grant ordered the battle to be renewed, but his foes were gone the next morning. McClernand occupied the important road center of Port Gibson early on May 2. Bowen intended to defend the Bayou Pierre crossing. However, he was not reinforced, so he abandoned the position. Loring soon arrived to assume command of Bowen's forces and withdrew the troops behind the Big Black River. Grand Gulf was evacuated after its magazines were blown up. At this time, Pemberton could have concentrated his army for a showdown battle with Grant, but he failed to act with decision. By May 4, Grant had his army north of Bayou Pierre and changed his base from Bruinsburg to Grand Gulf.

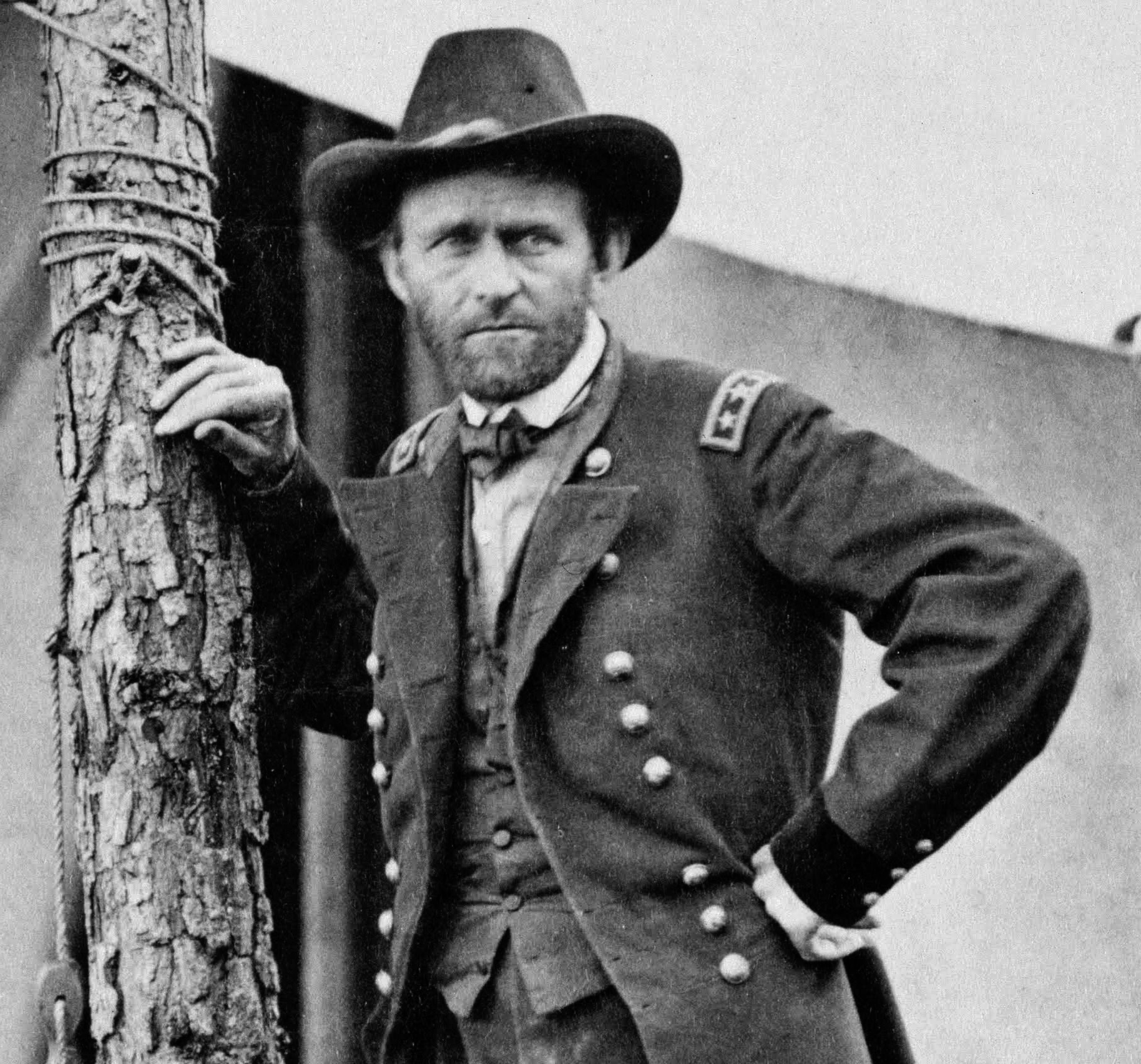
Ulysses S. Grant

Grant paused at Grand Gulf in order for Sherman's XV Corps to arrive, which it did on May 7. The original plan called for Grant to send the XIII Corps south to help Major General Nathaniel P. Banks reduce the Confederate stronghold at Port Hudson, Louisiana. In fact, Banks' army was still moving north from Opelousas, Louisiana, and his vanguard only reached Alexandria on May 7. When Grant found that Banks was not at Port Hudson, he decided to retain McClernand's corps and conduct his own campaign. Without a reliable supply line, Grant determined to have his soldiers live off the land. On May 6, even before Sherman's men joined him, Grant started his army marching northeast on the south side of the Big Black River with the aim of cutting the railroad between Vicksburg and Jackson. After several more victories, Grant's army surrounded Pemberton's forces in the Siege of Vicksburg by May 19.

== Battlefield preservation ==
Although most of the Port Gibson battlefield is still privately owned, the American Battlefield Trust and its partners have acquired and preserved more than 644 acres (2.61 km^{2}) of the battlefield as of mid-2023.

== See also ==
- Battles of the American Civil War
- Bibliography of Ulysses S. Grant
- Bibliography of the American Civil War
