= XVII Corps (Union army) =

Division of the Union Army during the American Civil War

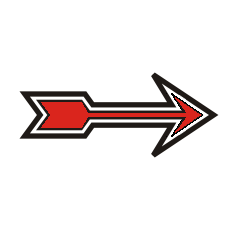
- XVII Corps badge
- Active: 1862 – 1865
- Country: United States of America
- Branch: Union Army
- Type: Army Corps
- Size: Corps
- Part of: Army of the Tennessee
- Engagements: American Civil War

Commanders
- Notable commanders: James B. McPherson; Francis P. Blair Jr.

Insignia
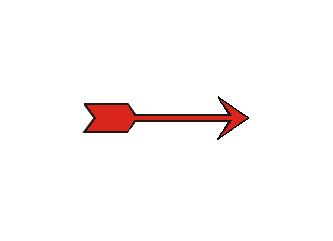
- 1st Division

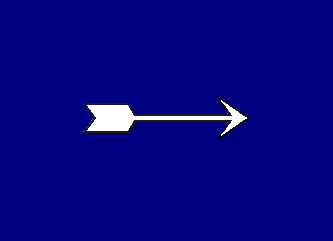
- 2nd Division

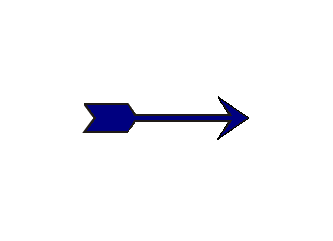
- 3rd Division

XVII Corps was a corps of the Union Army during the American Civil War. It was organized December 18, 1862 as part of Ulysses S. Grant's Army of the Tennessee. It was most notably commanded by Maj. Gen. James B. McPherson and Maj. Gen. Francis P. Blair II, and served in the Western Theater.

== Creation ==
In October 1862 the XIII Corps and XIV Corps were created in the Western Theater. At the time it was created the XIII Corps constituted the entire Army of the Tennessee under Ulysses S. Grant. Initially Grant subdivided the corps into the Right, Left and Center wings. Major General James B. McPherson led the Center of the XIII Corps. On December 18, 1862 the XIII Corps was officially divided. The Center officially became the XVII Corps with McPherson still in command and was originally composed of three divisions under John A. Logan, John McArthur, and Isaac F. Quinby.

== Vicksburg Campaign ==
Grant's Vicksburg Campaign was the XVII Corps' first operation. It fought the Battle of Raymond and captured Jackson alongside William T. Sherman's XV Corps. On May 16, 1863 it bore the brunt of the fighting in the Battle of Champion Hill. During the Siege of Vicksburg, it formed the center of the Union forces.

== Chattanooga and Meridian ==
While most of the XVII Corps was left in Mississippi, William T. Sherman took the 2nd Division, led by Brig. Gen. John E. Smith, to help in lifting the siege of Chattanooga. Two of Smith's brigades (led by Green Berry Raum and Karl Leopold Matthies) took a significant part in the Battle of Missionary Ridge.

In the winter of 1863–1864 Sherman returned to Vicksburg to lead the Meridian campaign. McPherson led the corps during the campaign. Only the 3rd and 4th Divisions and the 3rd Brigade of the 1st Division took part (the 2nd Division still being at Chattanooga).

== Atlanta Campaign ==
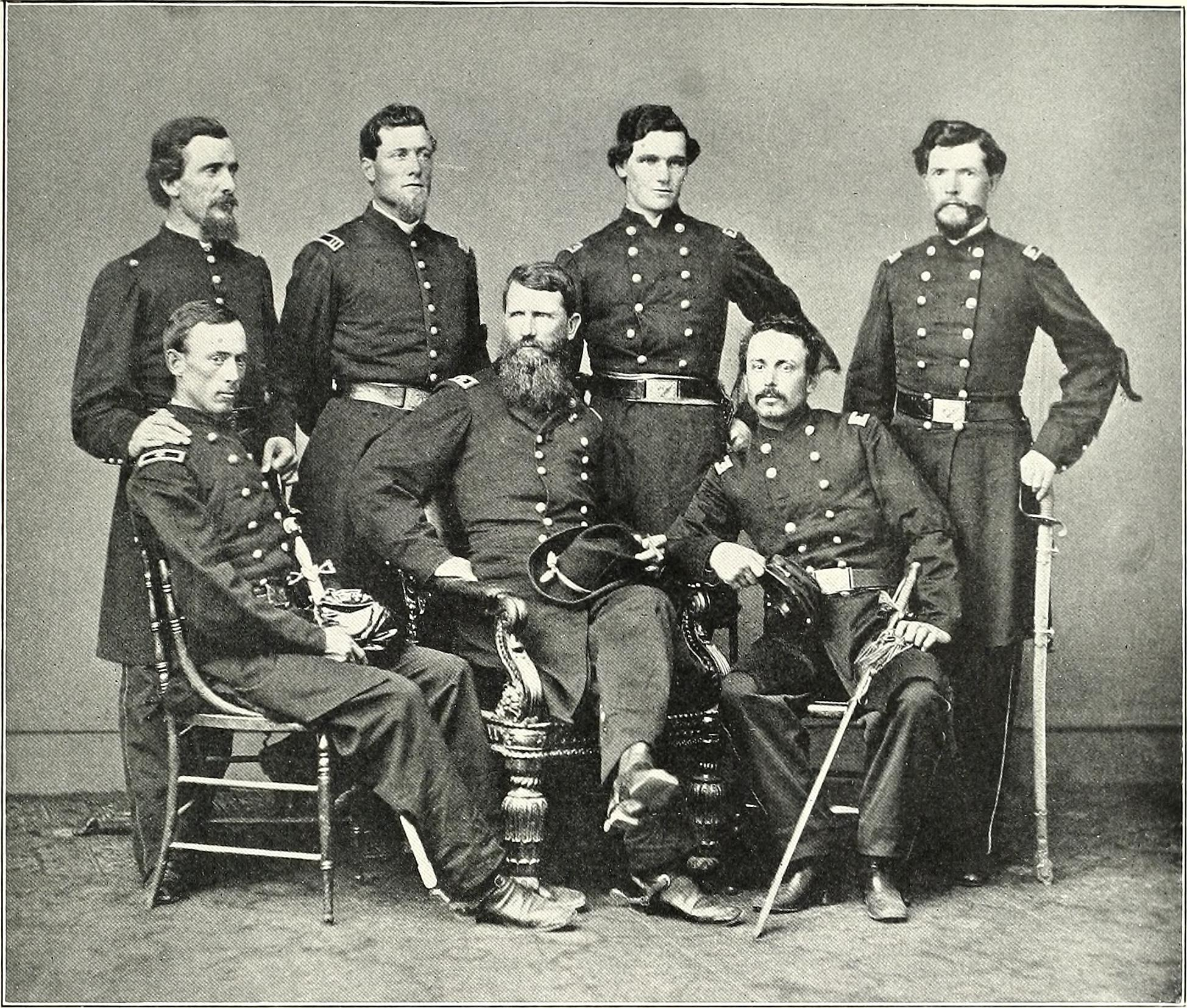
Francis Blair Jr. (center), shown with his staff, led the Union XVII Corps in the Atlanta campaign.

In 1864 General McPherson assumed command of the Army of the Tennessee and for a short time no officer was appointed to command the corps. Eventually Major General Francis P. Blair Jr. took command. Sherman transferred the rest of the corps to Georgia to take part in the Atlanta campaign. Only the 3rd and 4th Divisions took part in the campaign and these divisions missed much of the early battles but played a major role in the Battle of Kennesaw Mountain and the Battle of Atlanta. The 3rd Division under Mortimer D. Leggett had a particularly hard fight on Bald Hill. Bald Hill would be renamed Leggett's Hill in honor of the division commander. After the fall of Atlanta, General Blair took a leave of absence from the army and General Thomas E. G. Ransom commanded the XVII Corps. When Ransom died of exposure during the pursuit of John Bell Hood's army Blair returned shortly after to command of the corps.

== March to the Sea and the Carolinas ==
Blair led the corps during the March to the Sea and took part in the capture of Savannah, Georgia. The corps consisted of three divisions; First Division (formerly Fourth Division, XVI Corps) under Joseph A. Mower, Second Division (formerly Third) under Leggett, and Third (formerly Fourth) under Giles Smith. The XVII Corps fought exclusively in the Battle of Salkehatchie River, where two of Blair's brigade defeated a Confederate force attempting to block Sherman's crossing of the river. Blair and the corps were present at the Battle of Bentonville but did not take an active part in the fighting.

== Red River Division ==
One division formerly part of the XVII Corps was dubbed the Red River Division or the Provisional Division and was attached to the Right Wing-XVI Corps under Andrew J. Smith. The division was led by Thomas K. Smith and fought in many of the important battles during Red River Campaign. The Red River Division moved to Nashville. It was again attached to A.J. Smith's command only this time it was styled the 3rd Division of the "Detachment of the Army of the Tennessee". The division was led by Colonel Jonathan B. Moore and was lightly engaged at the Battle of Nashville.

== Command history ==
James B. McPherson	22 December 1862 – 12 March 1864
no commander	12 March 1864 – 4 May 1864
Francis P. Blair Jr.	4 May 1864 – 22 September 1864
Thomas E. G. Ransom	22 September 1864 – 10 October 1864
Mortimer D. Leggett	10 October 1864 – 24 October 1864
Joseph A. Mower	24 October 1864 – 31 October 1864
Francis P. Blair Jr.	31 October 1864 – 19 July 1865
W. W. Belknap	19 July 1865 – 1 August 1865
