= Bras =

Bras or BRAS may refer to:

- Bras, Var, a commune in the Var département of France
- Bras (surname), a surname
- "BRAS", Broadband Remote Access Server
- Bras Island, an island of Indonesia
- Le Gros Bras (Gouffre River tributary), a tributary of rivière du Gouffre in Charlevoix Regional County Municipality, Capitale-Nationale, Quebec, Canada

== See also ==
- Bra, or brassiere, a woman's undergarment
- Quatre Bras (disambiguation)
- Fortinbras
- Petrobras
