= James Lorraine Geddes =

American songwriter (1827–1887)

- Born: March 19, 1827; Edinburgh, Scotland, United Kingdom
- Died: February 21, 1887 (aged 59); Ames, Iowa, United States
- Burial place: Ames, Iowa
- Military career
- Allegiance: Great Britain; United States of America; Union
- Branch: British Army; Union Army
- Service years: 1861–1865 (USA)
- Rank: Colonel; Bvt. Brigadier General
- Commands: 8th Iowa Infantry Regiment
- Conflicts: Second Anglo-Sikh War; American Civil War

James Lorraine Geddes (March 19, 1827 – February 21, 1887) was a soldier in India, a brigade commander in the Western Theater of the American Civil War, college administrator and professor, and military songwriter.

== Biography ==
Geddes was born in Edinburgh, Scotland. In his boyhood he was taken to Canada, but in 1843 he returned to Scotland. He then studied at Calcutta in the British military academy, entered the British Army in the Royal Horse Artillery, and after distinguishing himself in the Punjab campaign in the Second Anglo-Sikh War, particularly at the Khyber Pass. He returned to Canada and was commissioned a colonel in a regiment of cavalry. He married New York native Margaret Moore on October 14, 1856, in Yarmouth, Nova Scotia. In 1857 he resigned from the army and moved to the United States, settling in Vinton, Iowa, where he taught school.

In the American Civil War, Geddes served in the Union army, enlisting as a private in the 8th Iowa Infantry. He was promoted to captain and then lieutenant colonel, and after February 1862 as colonel of volunteers. He took part in the fighting at Shiloh, where he was wounded and captured. He was imprisoned for a time at Madison, Georgia, and in Libby Prison in Richmond, Virginia. After being exchanged, he fought at Vicksburg and Jackson. In October 1863, he was given command of a brigade and sent to Brownsville, Texas. Subsequently, he served as the provost marshal of Federal occupied Memphis, Tennessee, which he saved from seizure by Confederate cavalry under Nathan Bedford Forrest. He commanded a brigade in the Mobile Campaign and fought with distinction at the Battle of Spanish Fort. On January 13, 1866, President Andrew Johnson nominated Geddes for appointment to the grade of brevet brigadier general of volunteers, to rank from June 5, 1865, and the United States Senate confirmed the appointment on March 12, 1866.

After the war, Geddes was principal of the Iowa College for the Blind at Vinton, and until his death was connected with the Iowa College of Agriculture at Ames, being military instructor and cashier in 1870–1882, acting president in 1875–77, librarian in 1877–78, vice-president and professor of military tactics in 1880–82, and treasurer in 1884–87. He wrote a number of popular war songs, including The Soldiers' Battle Prayer and The Stars and Stripes.

He died at Ames, Iowa on February 21, 1887, and is buried in Evergreen, Cemetery, Vinton, Iowa.

== See also ==
- List of American Civil War brevet generals (Union)
