= Battle of Jackson =

1863 battle of the American Civil War

- Part of the American Civil War
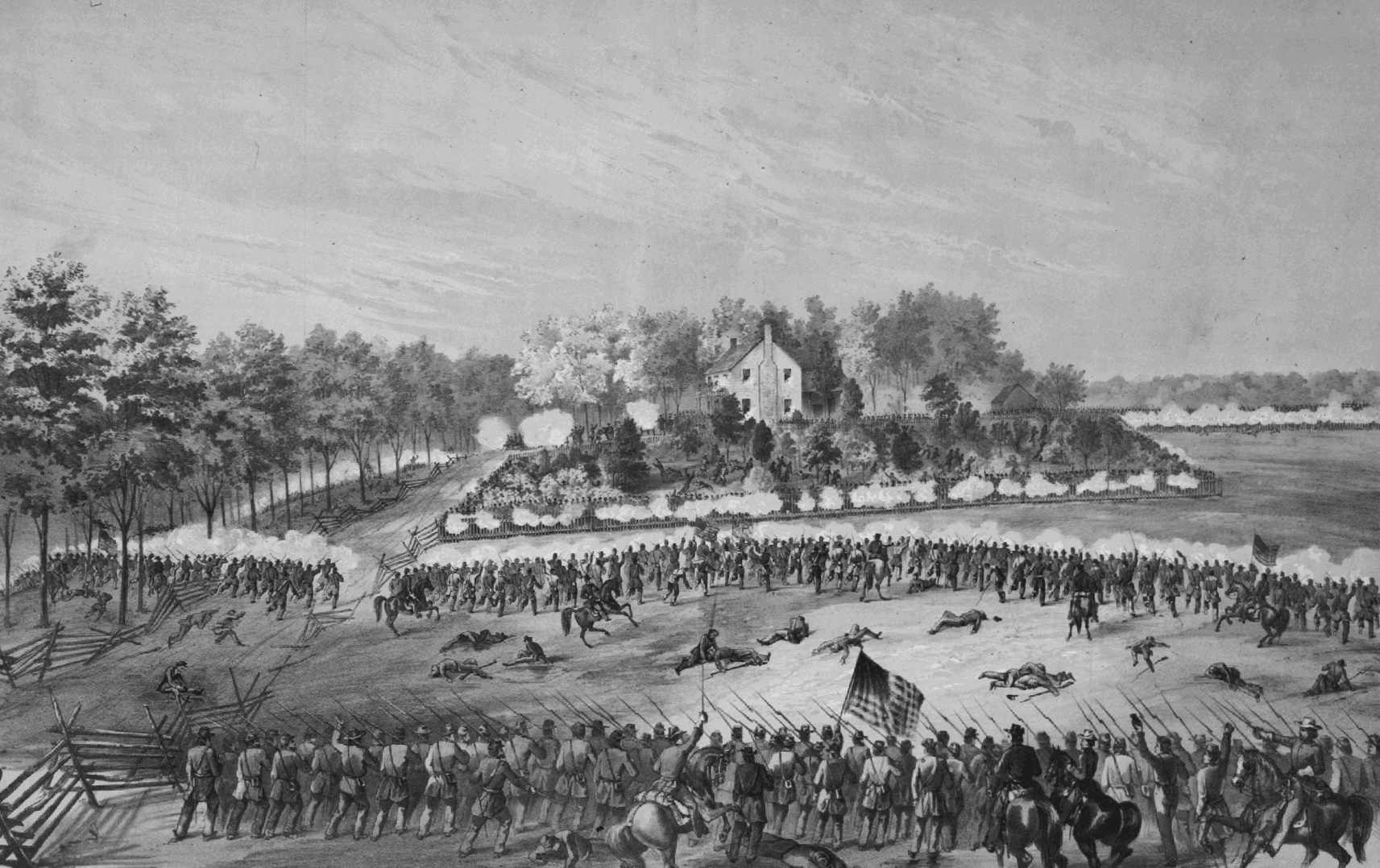
- "Battle of Jackson, Mississippi—Gallant Charge of the 17th Iowa, 80th Ohio and 10th Missouri, Supported by the First and Third Brigades of the Seventh Division"
Date	May 14, 1863
Location	Jackson, Mississippi 32°17′15″N 90°12′00″W
Result	Union victory

Belligerents
United States (Union)	Confederate States

Commanders and leaders
Ulysses S. Grant; James B. McPherson; William T. Sherman	Joseph E. Johnston; John Gregg

Units involved
XV Corps; XVII Corps	Jackson Garrison

Strength
11,500 (engaged)	6,000

Casualties and losses
300; 41 killed, 251 wounded, 7 missing	c. 200–300+
- Location in Mississippi

The Battle of Jackson was fought on May 14, 1863, outside Jackson, Mississippi, during the Vicksburg campaign of the American Civil War. As part of a campaign to capture the strategic Mississippi River town of Vicksburg, Mississippi, Major General Ulysses S. Grant of the Union Army began moving his force east across the river on April 30, 1863. This beachhead was protected by a victory at the Battle of Port Gibson on May 1. Moving inland, Grant intended to wheel his army north to strike the railroad between Vicksburg and the Mississippi capital of Jackson. On May 12, the Union XVII Corps of Major General James B. McPherson defeated Confederate troops commanded by Brigadier General John Gregg at the Battle of Raymond. This alerted Grant to the presence of a potentially dangerous Confederate force at Jackson, leading him to change his plans and swing towards Jackson with McPherson's corps and Major General William T. Sherman's XV Corps.

General Joseph E. Johnston was ordered to take command of the growing Confederate force at Jackson, but after arriving at the city quickly decided that it could not be held. Johnston's decision to abandon Jackson has since been criticized by historians. With McPherson's corps approaching Jackson from the northwest and Sherman's from the southwest, Gregg was tasked with fighting a delaying action on May 14 while the Confederates evacuated supplies from the city. Gregg, at first unaware of the approach of Sherman's corps, positioned his troops to block McPherson's advance. Once Sherman's presence became known, Gregg dispatched a cobbled-together force commanded by Colonel Albert P. Thompson to delay Sherman. The Union advances were hampered by rain and muddy roads. Thompson's force initially took a position behind the sole local crossing of Lynch Creek, but withdrew due to heavy Union artillery fire. After the rain ceased, McPherson's troops drove the Confederates back into the line of fortifications surrounding Jackson.

By around 2:00 pm, Gregg was informed that the Confederate wagon train had left Jackson, and he withdrew his forces from the city. Sherman's soldiers captured several Mississippi State Troops and armed civilians who were manning a line of cannons to mask the Confederate withdrawal. Union troops entered Jackson, leading to chaotic destruction and pillaging, although some of the destruction was the work of local civilians and fires set by the retreating Confederates. McPherson's corps moved west on May 15 in support of Major General John A. McClernand's XIII Corps, while Sherman's men remained at the city to complete the destruction of infrastructure and manufacturing facilities, particularly the railroads. The Confederate commander at Vicksburg, Lieutenant General John C. Pemberton, received orders from Johnston regarding cooperation, despite Johnston moving his army away from Pemberton. Pemberton initially attempted to comply with Johnston's orders, but after a council of war decided to strike at what the Confederates believed to be Grant's supply line. Grant's army decisively defeated Pemberton at the Battle of Champion Hill on May 16; May 18 saw Union troops approaching the defenses of Vicksburg. After a siege, Vicksburg surrendered on July 4. Johnston, who had been reinforced for the purpose of assisting Vicksburg, reoccupied Jackson but failed to make a serious attempt to lift the siege. Johnston's army was driven from Jackson a second time in July, after the Jackson expedition.

== Background ==
During the early days of the American Civil War, Winfield Scott, the General-in-Chief of the United States (Union) Army, proposed the Anaconda Plan for defeating the Confederacy, and it was informally adopted. Part of this plan involved taking control of the Mississippi River, which was a major transportation route that was economically vital for the states west of the Appalachians. Though much of the river was under Union control by the end of 1862, the city of Vicksburg, Mississippi, remained in Confederate hands. Vicksburg, which was a naturally strong defensive position, allowed the eastern portion of the Confederacy to retain communication with the Trans-Mississippi Department to the west and blocked Union movement downriver. The Union Navy unsuccessfully attempted to capture the city in mid-1862. An army attempt consisting of an overland expedition led by Major General Ulysses S. Grant failed in December 1862, as did a concurrent amphibious operation commanded by Major General William T. Sherman. In early 1863, Grant attempted to capture Vicksburg or open an alternate water route around the city through a series of operations that involved moving troops through the many bayous in the area or building canals.

By late March, the various attempts to capture or bypass Vicksburg had failed, and Grant found himself considering three options. He could send his troops in a risky amphibious assault across the river against the city's defenses; he could withdraw his troops north to Memphis, Tennessee, and conduct another overland campaign against Vicksburg; or he could move his troops down the west bank of the Mississippi River, cross to the east side of the river and then operate against Vicksburg. The first option risked heavy casualties, and a withdrawal to Memphis in preparation for an overland campaign would impair morale on the home front. While there were geographic and logistical issues with the movement down the west bank of the Mississippi and subsequent crossing, Grant chose to begin that movement. In April, while Grant's troops marched downriver, several Union diversionary operations, especially Grierson's Raid, distracted Confederate regional commander John C. Pemberton.

Grant's operations against Vicksburg Confederate Union

With his troops having completed the march downriver, Grant wanted to cross at Grand Gulf, Mississippi, but on April 29, Union Navy ships failed to silence the Confederate batteries there in the Battle of Grand Gulf. Instead, he moved his troops further south and crossed at Bruinsburg on April 30 and May 1. Grant's beachhead was protected by a Union victory at the Battle of Port Gibson on May 1. To the north, the Confederates held a line running from Warrenton to the Big Black River. Rather than assault this line, Grant decided to move towards the northeast. This movement would cut the rail line which supplied Vicksburg between that city and the Mississippi state capital of Jackson. Grant intended for his troops to strike the railroad from Bolton to Edwards Station, destroy the tracks, and then move west towards Vicksburg. His army consisted of the XIII Corps commanded by Major General John A. McClernand, the XV Corps commanded by Sherman, and Major General James B. McPherson's XVII Corps; during the advance, the corps were aligned from left to right in that order. McPherson's and McClernand's corps began their movement on May 7; Sherman's troops had not crossed the river as early as Grant thought they had and did not begin the movement east until the following day. Pemberton considered abandoning the Confederate position at Port Hudson, Louisiana, and concentrating his troops against Grant, but the Confederate president Jefferson Davis ordered the defense of both Port Hudson and Vicksburg.

== Prelude ==
=== Raymond and response ===
Jackson and surrounding locations

General Joseph E. Johnston commanded all Confederate forces between the Mississippi River and the Appalachian Mountains. The two primary Confederate armies in Johnston's department were Pemberton's, which was known as the Army of Mississippi, and in Tennessee, the Army of Tennessee under General Braxton Bragg. Johnston thought the two armies, which were outnumbered by the forces the Union could deploy in the theater, should be consolidated, but Davis thought Pemberton and Bragg's forces should operate separately, and that Johnston should shuttle forces between the two as necessary. On May 9, the Confederate government ordered Johnston to Mississippi so that he could exercise personal command of the forces there. Johnston, who was in Tennessee, did not want to make the movement. He argued that Bragg's army needed direct supervision more than Pemberton's did, and that he was too unwell from the effects of old wounds for direct field service; there is disagreement among historians as to whether his claims about his physical health were genuine or an excuse not to make the movement. Johnston left Tennessee for Jackson on May 10.

While Grant moved northeast on the east side of the Big Black River, Pemberton made sure his troops kept the crossing of the Big Black covered. The Confederates moved north on the west side of the Big Black as Grant's troops also moved north. On May 11, Pemberton decided that Grant was only feinting towards Jackson, and to secure the railroad bridge over the Big Black River, moved three of his five available divisions to Edwards Station. Confederate reinforcements were sent to the theater, and would concentrate at Jackson. Some came from Tennessee following Johnston. General Robert E. Lee opposed transferring any troops from his army, but troops were drawn from South Carolina and Savannah, Georgia, and sent towards Jackson. In an aggressive action, Pemberton moved the brigade of Brigadier General John Gregg from Jackson to an isolated position at Raymond, where Pemberton thought it could strike Grant's flank.

Gregg underestimated the size of the Union force opposing his brigade, and attacked McPherson's vanguard on May 12, bringing on the battle of Raymond. After a confused fight, the Confederates were driven from the field; Gregg's men returned to Jackson on May 13. From Grant's perspective, the fight at Raymond was unexpected. Further, Grant assumed that the Confederates would have had an accurate conception of the size of McPherson's force, and would only attack if they felt themselves strong enough to take it on. Raymond led Grant to change his plans. He had earlier sent orders to Sherman and McPherson to turn north towards the railroad, but realizing that the Confederate forces gathering at Jackson were a greater threat than he had previously believed, ordered his army to swing towards the Mississippi capital. Grant had a high opinion of Johnston's abilities as a commander, and was aware of reports that Johnston had been dispatched to Jackson. From Grant's perspective, Johnston's presence increased the risk of ignoring the Jackson buildup. As well, offensive action against Jackson if successful would allow for greater disruption to the Confederate rail and communication network than just damaging a short stretch of the railroad between Jackson and Vicksburg. McClernand's corps was to move west and guard against an attack by Pemberton, and Sherman's corps was to move to the right of McPherson's. This plan carried with it some risk, as McClernand was known to be facing the division of Confederate Brigadier General John S. Bowen, who had a reputation as an aggressive and capable commander, but Grant expected that Pemberton's caution would overrule Bowen's aggression at least until McClernand could successfully disengage.

To fulfill his orders, McClernand had to disengage from Pemberton's force, which outnumbered his corps, and form a line from Bolton to Raymond. Movements to accomplish this were made on May 13. McPherson had orders to move to Clinton and tear up the railroad there before moving against Jackson from the northwest; this movement was accomplished on the afternoon of May 13. The path of Sherman's corps approached Jackson from the southwest. There was about 14 miles (23 km) between Jackson and Raymond. McPherson's advance met no substantial opposition, but Sherman's troops fought a small skirmish with Confederate troops near the community of Mississippi Springs; Sherman's troops spent the night camped at Mississippi Springs and along the road to the west. One of Sherman's divisions, commanded by Major General Francis Preston Blair Jr., was not operating with the rest of Sherman's corps at this time.

=== Johnston decides to abandon Jackson ===
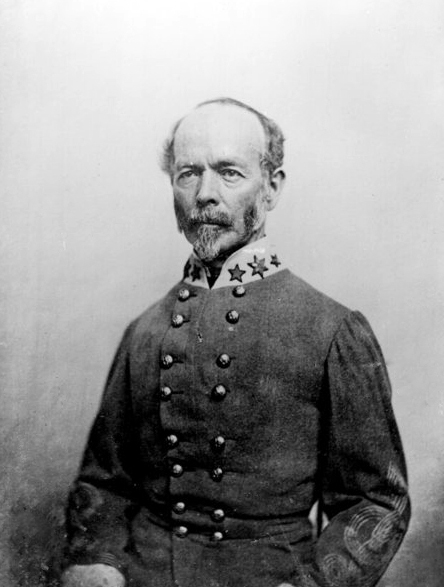
General Joseph E. Johnston, who ordered the evacuation of Jackson

At Jackson, Gregg had an inaccurate perception of Union movements. He was aware that McPherson's troops were moving towards Clinton, but when intelligence placed two other Union divisions at Raymond (Sherman's), Gregg assumed that those troops were also headed for Clinton. Johnston arrived in Jackson on May 13. About 6,000 Confederate troops held the city, including Gregg's recently defeated men. More Confederate reinforcements were approaching, under the command of Brigadier Generals States Rights Gist and Samuel B. Maxey; these troops would have given Johnston around 15,000 men to hold Jackson, although damage to the railroad that Maxey's troops were advancing on in their move from Port Hudson meant that the arrival time of that brigade was uncertain. There were also large stores of supplies in Jackson.

During his journey to Jackson, Johnston received intelligence that Grant's army was striking towards Edwards Station, while Pemberton's force was holding a defensive position along the Big Black River. The Union force was between the Confederate positions. Johnston, who had tendencies towards defeatism, decided that Jackson could not be held in what the historians William L. Shea and Terrence J. Winschel describe as "unseemly haste", sent a telegram to the Confederate government in Richmond, Virginia, stating "I am too late", and ordered the evacuation of the city. The historian Steven E. Woodworth describes the "I am too late" message as "classic Johnston style". The governor of Mississippi relocated the state capital to Enterprise. Johnston placed Gregg in command of the rear guard left in Jackson. By 3:30 am on May 14, the evacuation of Jackson had begun. Supplies were sent 25 miles (40 km) northeast via wagon train to Canton. Brigadier General John Adams's brigade escorted the wagon train.

Maxey was ordered to withdraw to Brookhaven, which was 55 miles (89 km) south of Jackson; Gist was told to assemble his men "at a point 40 or 50 miles from Jackson". While retreating, Johnston sent Pemberton a misleading message suggesting that Johnston's men would support Pemberton in an offensive movement when he had no intention of doing so. The historian Donald L. Miller believes that this was designed to present the appearance in the official records that he was not abandoning Vicksburg. Also, one of the couriers Johnston used to send his message to Pemberton was actually a Union spy who eventually delivered the document to McPherson. The historian Chris Mackowski believes that by waiting for the arrival of Gist and Maxey's brigades and concentrating his forces at Jackson, Johnston could have "significantly complicate[d] matters" for Grant. The historian Ed Bearss writes that the Confederates lacked time to put together an adequate defense. Bearss believes that Johnston may have been able to repulse the movement that Gregg believed was occurring – an advance solely from the direction of Clinton – but that the Confederates could not have fended off both McPherson and Sherman's advances. The historian Michael B. Ballard describes Johnston's withdrawal from Jackson as "fatal to whatever hopes the Confederacy had of saving Vicksburg. The geographer and historian Warren Grabau interprets the timing of Johnston's decision-making somewhat differently: an initial decision to abandon Jackson after arriving and consulting with Gregg which was associated with the "I am too late" message, followed by a time of reconsideration which included the more aggressive message to Pemberton discussing cooperation, and then early on May 14 a final decision to withdraw from the city.

== Battle ==
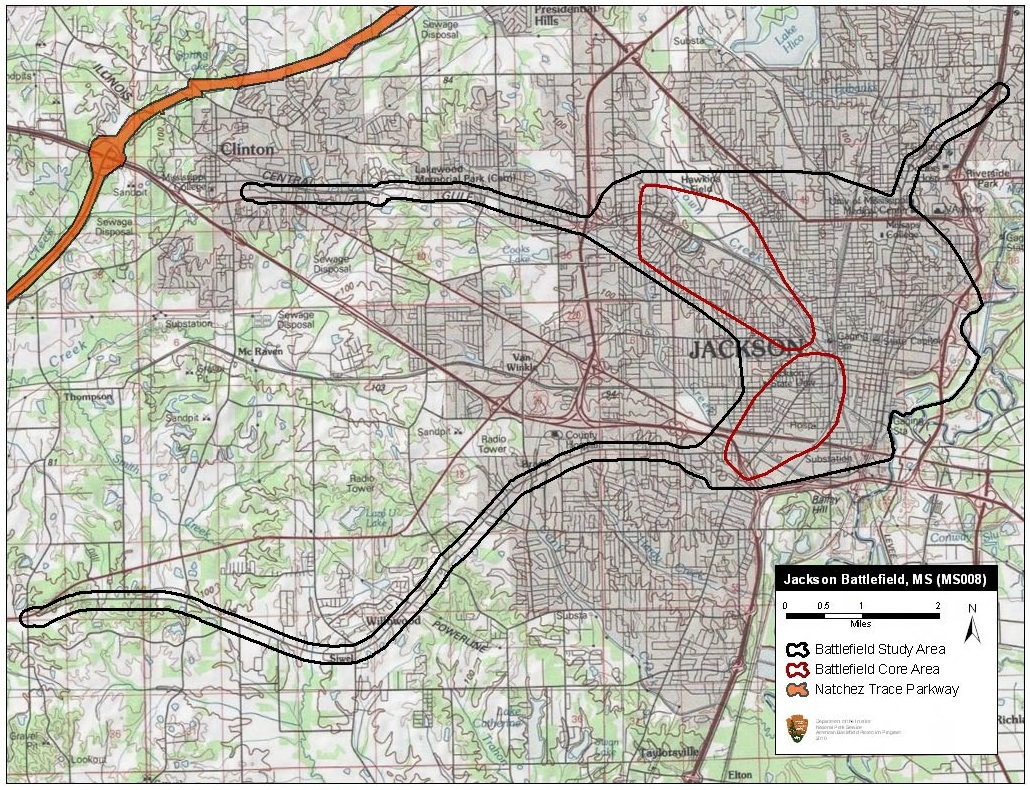
Map of Jackson battlefield study area by the American Battlefield Protection Program

=== Initial fighting (3:00 am to 11:00 am) ===
Gregg began making his dispositions for the coming fight at 3:00 am on May 14; he was tasked with fighting a delaying action rather than holding the city. He sent around 900 men commanded by Colonel Peyton Colquitt in the direction of Clinton; Gregg had Colquitt form a defensive line at the O. P. Wright farm 3 miles (4.8 km) from Jackson. From the Wright house, open ground sloped downhill towards a timbered ravine for 0.75 miles (1.2 km). Two artillery batteries supported Colquitt's line, and Brigadier General W. H. T. Walker's brigade took up position within supporting distance of Colquitt. Gregg's own brigade was held in reserve in Jackson; it was under the command of Colonel Robert Farquharson for the battle. Earlier in the month, the Mississippi civil authorities had ordered the construction of fortifications surrounding Jackson. The city was located on a bend of the Pearl River and the fortification line met the river on both ends. The work was performed by impressed slaves and white volunteers. These earthworks, which were incomplete at the time of the battles, contained seventeen cannons and were manned by armed civilians and Mississippi State Troops. Factoring into Gregg's decision to fight outside the earthworks was the layout of the fortifications where they met the road from Clinton – there, the earthworks formed a salient that was not readily defensible given the numerical deficit Gregg (who thought the entire Union force was approaching from Clinton) believed he faced. Grabau believes Gregg likely positioned Walker's brigades in a separate line behind Colquitt's to force the Union troops to take time to repeatedly deploy to assault successive defensive lines.

The XVII Corps left Clinton at 5:00 am, led by Brigadier General Marcellus M. Crocker's division. The movement was made in a heavy rainstorm, which turned the roads to mud. After moving 2 miles (3.2 km) from Clinton, the commander of the leading Union brigade, Colonel Samuel A. Holmes, threw forward an advanced guard from the 10th Missouri Infantry Regiment in anticipation of contact with Confederate troops. Sherman's corps moved out from Mississippi Springs that morning as well; Sherman and McPherson coordinated their approaches through the use of messengers travelling on a road between Clinton and Mississippi Springs, intending to strike Jackson with both columns at about the same time. Grant accompanied Sherman's column, which was also slowed by the rain and mud. Grant later recounted that parts of Sherman's march were made through standing water in excess of 1 foot (30 cm) in depth. Holmes's advance guard from the 10th Missouri skirmished with Confederate troops for several miles, while Sherman's march up the Mississippi Springs road was contested by skirmishers for most of the way. Sherman's advance was led by the division of Brigadier General James M. Tuttle; the expected marching order of Tuttle's division was varied so that it was led by Brigadier General Joseph A. Mower's brigade instead of Brigadier General Ralph Buckland's.

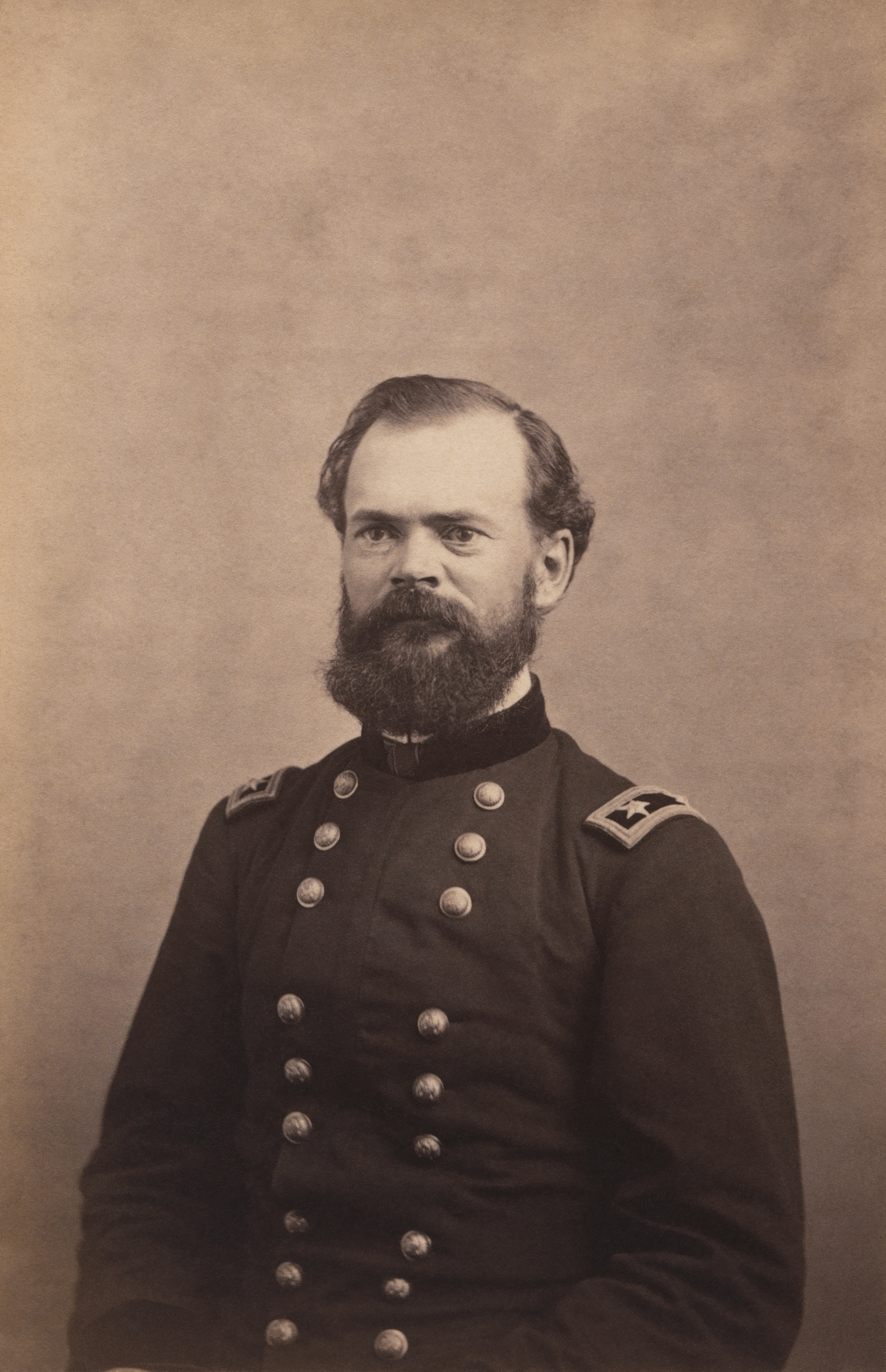
Major General James B. McPherson's corps attacked Jackson from the northwest

At around 9:00 am, McPherson's troops encountered Colquitt's main line. Gregg advanced Farquharson's brigade into a field off to the right of Colquitt, in a position to threaten the left flank of Union troops advancing against Colquitt. The Confederate Brookhaven Light Artillery battery opened fire on the leading Union forces with four cannons. In response, Battery M, 1st Missouri Light Artillery Regiment was brought to the front. The Union battery took up a position near the W. T. Mann house and opened fire on the Confederates with four 10-pounder Parrott rifles at roughly 10:00 am. McPherson deployed his troops for battle but delayed attacking due to the rain; the infantry had been issued with paper cartridges and so could not open their cartridge boxes in the rain without ruining their ammunition. McPherson's men spent about an hour and a half maneuvering into position in the rain, while the artillery batteries dueled; the Union infantry was exposed to solid shot and shells from the Confederate cannons. Holmes's brigade was positioned in the center of Crocker's line, with Colonel George B. Boomer's brigade to the left and Colonel John B. Sanborn's brigade to the right. Major General John A. Logan's division advanced along the railroad to Crocker's left, damaging it as it went; the presence of Logan's troops made it impracticable for Farquharson to attack Crocker's flank. Bearss believes that McPherson recognized that Farquharson's position was an empty threat and ignored the Confederate brigade.

Gregg learned of Sherman's advance, and sent a collection of troops known as "Task Force Thompson" to delay Sherman's approach. This task force was commanded by Colonel A. P. Thompson of the 3rd Kentucky Mounted Infantry and consisted of Thompson's regiment, the 1st Georgia Sharpshooter Battalion, and Martin's Georgia Battery, which had four cannons. The artillery and sharpshooters were taken from Walker's brigade. Sherman's line of approach crossed Lynch Creek 5 miles (8 km) from Mississippi Springs; this was about 2.5 miles (4 km) from Jackson. The heavy rains made it impossible to ford the creek, limiting the crossing to a single bridge. Thompson and his 1,000 men held the crossing by the time Sherman's 10,000 men reached the creek. After 10:00 am, Sherman could hear McPherson's fight as his men approached Lynch Creek under rapid Confederate artillery fire. Tuttle deployed his division with Mower's brigade to the right, Colonel Charles Matthies's brigade to the left, and Buckland's men in reserve. Shortly after noon, Grant sent a message to McPherson, which stated in part "We must get Jackson or as near it as possible to-night".

=== Confederate defeat (11:00 am to 3:00 pm) ===
McPherson began his attack at 11:00 am, the rain having slowed. The advance was led by skirmishers from Holmes's and Sanborn's brigades, who drove the Confederate skirmishers back to their main line at the Wright house, but were withdrawn to rejoin their regiments after encountering heavy Confederate fire. After further probing of the Confederate line, Crocker determined that he faced only a small force of Confederates and ordered a charge. After a brief pause in a ravine, Crocker's troops reached the Confederate line by the Wright house. The 10th Missouri fought the 24th South Carolina Infantry Regiment in a melee in which the South Carolinians' commander, Lieutenant Colonel Ellison Capers, was wounded. Two Union batteries followed the infantry advance closely. Although Logan's troops did not participate in the fighting, their presence at the field complicated matters for Farquharson, whose brigade was separated from Colquitt by a flooded creek. Farquharson withdrew his troops from the field and joined Johnston's retreat from Jackson. Boomer's troops were less heavily engaged in the charge than those of Sanborn and Holmes. Crocker's troops paused and reorganized rather than pursuing the defeated Confederates directly into Jackson, although the 6th Wisconsin Battery fired on the retreating Confederates from a position hear the Wright house.

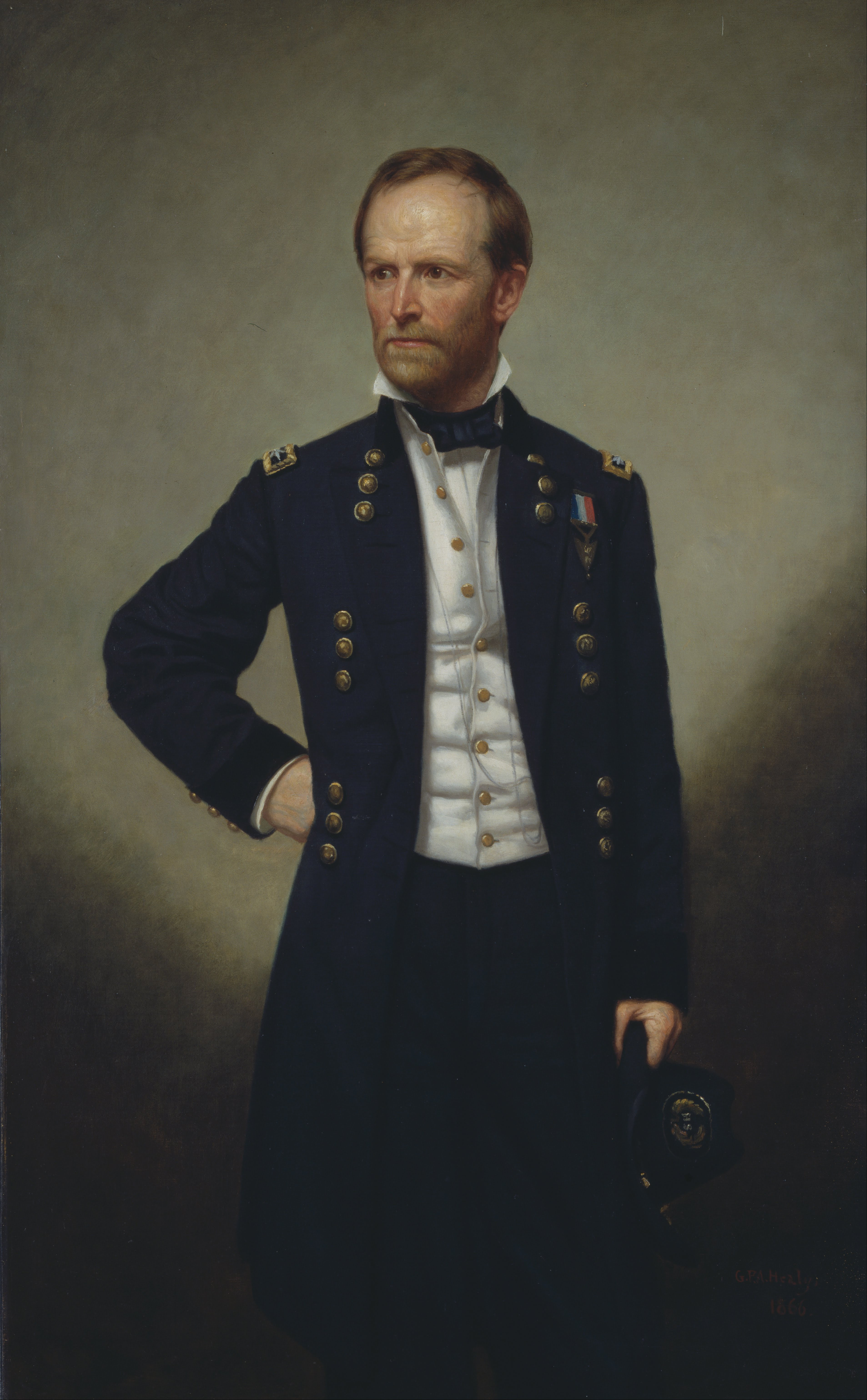
Major General William T. Sherman's corps attacked Jackson from the southwest

On Sherman's front, Battery E, 1st Illinois Light Artillery Regiment and the 2nd Iowa Battery were deployed to counter the Confederate artillery; the two batteries combined had twelve cannons. Thompson's men withdrew from the creek after only 20 minutes due to the heavy Union artillery fire; this was the only position that the outnumbered Confederates could have hoped to hold against Sherman's men. The Confederates did not attempt to destroy the bridge across Lynch Creek; Bearss speculates that they may have believed that the bridge was too wet to burn. Thompsons' men fell back to a stretch of woods in front of the line of defensive works built around Jackson; this was near the site which was later developed into Battlefield Park. With another ten cannons in the defensive works, which were held by Mississippi State Troops and armed civilians, the Confederates now had an artillery advantage.

Sherman's advance was slowed by the necessity of crossing Lynch Creek at the single bridge. After Tuttle's troops crossed the creek, Mower's troops were aligned to the left and Matthies's to the right, with Buckland's brigade still in reserve. Faced by the strong Union force, Thompson withdrew his troops into the defensive works. Tuttle brought Buckland's brigade up from reserve to the division's right, but Buckland's troops came under fire from six Confederate cannons, and Sherman's attack halted at around 1:30 pm. Sherman ordered Captain Julius Pitzman, an engineering officer, to take Buckland's 95th Ohio Infantry Regiment to the right and see if the Confederate line could be flanked. Pitzman and the 95th Ohio advanced through wooded ground until they reached the line of the New Orleans, Jackson and Great Northern Railroad. Reaching the Confederate defensive line, the Union soldiers found it abandoned. An African American civilian informed them that the Confederates had withdrawn from Jackson, leaving only the artillery firing on Sherman's lines as a rearguard. The 95th Ohio then attacked the Confederate artillery position and captured the Mississippi State Troops and civilians manning the guns, taking fifty-two prisoners and capturing six cannons.

Pitzman reported to Sherman the findings of the 95th Ohio, and Sherman ordered Major General Frederick Steele's newly arrived division off to the right to advance to where the Confederate works had been found empty. Mower made a personal reconnaissance and came to the conclusion that the Confederate position could be readily stormed; this was supported by the sound of the 95th Ohio's assault behind the Confederate lines. In response to these developments, Tuttle's division attacked. Mower's and Matthies's brigades assaulted the Confederate lines, the 8th Iowa Infantry Regiment being the first to reach the Confederate position. Mopping-up operations resulted in the capture of another four cannons and ninety-eight prisoners. The bulk of the Confederate troops had already left Jackson. Gregg had been informed at around 2:00 pm by Adams that the Confederate wagon train had withdrawn from Jackson. Colquitt and Walker's troops withdrew through Jackson, and Thompson's men followed at the rear of the retreating column. Thompson had been ordered to disguise his retreat. After Battery M of the 1st Missouri and the 6th Wisconsin Battery fired on the Confederate works, Holmes sent troops from his brigade forward and found the Confederates gone; this occurred at around 3:00 pm. There was brief Confederate resistance near where the road to Clinton ran through the Confederate line. A Union flag was raised over the Mississippi State Capitol, although multiple regiments had competing claims as to which unit's flag it was; debate on this subject continued for decades after the war. One of Logan's brigades was sent to attempt to cut Gregg's retreat but was not successful; the Confederates camped 7 miles (11 km) north at Tougaloo. Jackson was the third Confederate state capital to be captured.

== Aftermath ==
=== Destruction of Jackson ===
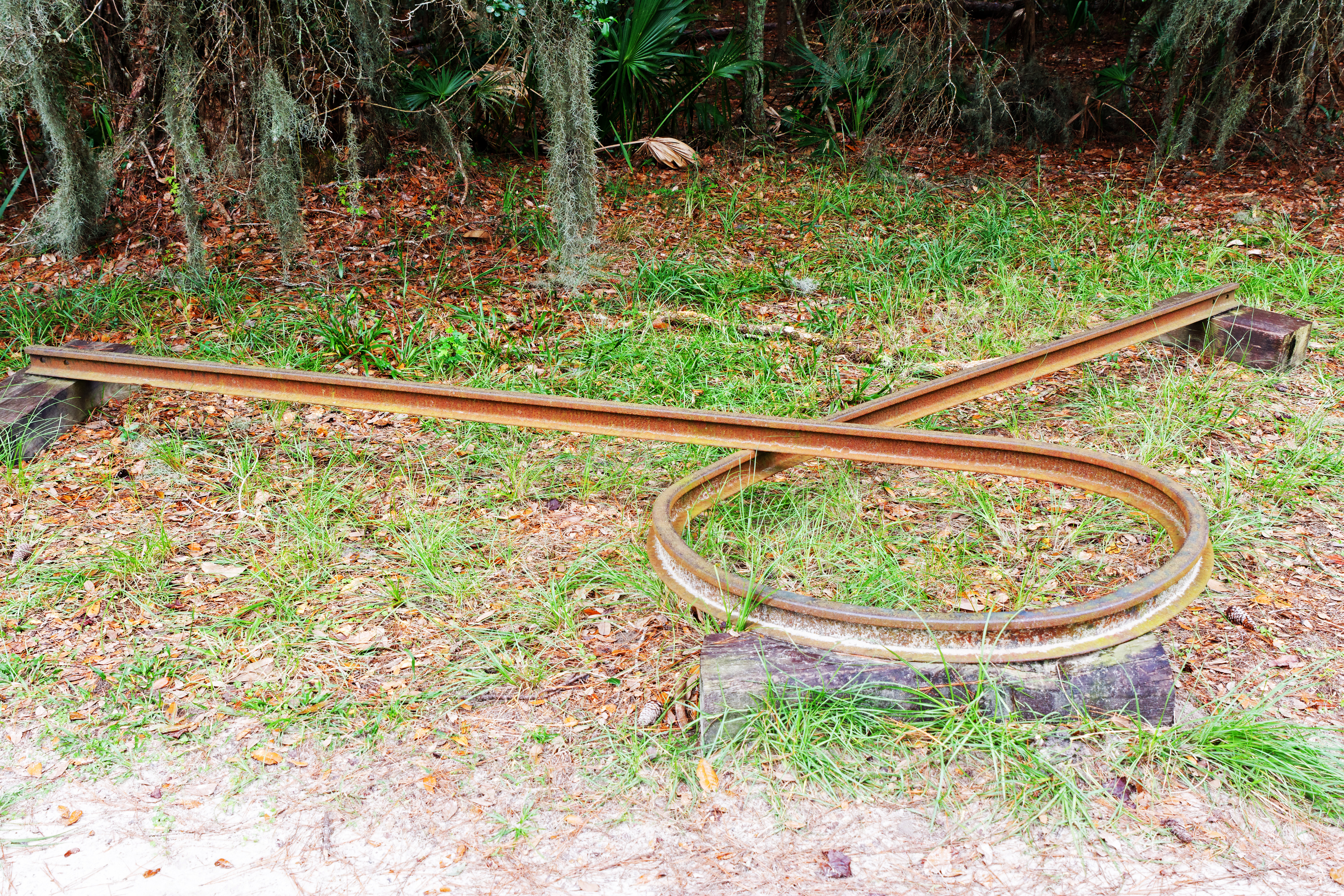
A Sherman's necktie. Union troops destroyed railroad rails at Jackson by bending them in a similar manner.

Grant's two engaged divisions (Crocker's and Tuttle's) had a combined strength of around 11,500; Logan and Steele's troops who were not directly engaged contributed another 12,000 soldiers. The historian Timothy B. Smith places Union casualties during the battle at 300, of which Holmes's brigade alone suffered 215. Over a quarter of the Union losses were suffered by one regiment, the 17th Iowa Infantry. Bearss and the historians William L. Shea and Terrence J. Winschel agree with this total figure and break down the losses as 42 killed, 251 wounded, and 7 missing. Smith estimates that the Confederates lost about 200 men. Colquitt had 17 soldiers killed, 64 wounded, and 118 missing; Farquharson and Walker did not prepare a report of casualties, nor was a report of losses made for the armed civilians, Mississippi State Troops, Thompson's regiment, or an unattached company of Georgia cavalry. McPherson's post-battle report claimed that the Confederates had suffered 845 casualties; the historian Jim Woodrick casts doubt on the accuracy of this claim and states "I can't see where [...] Confederate losses could have been much more than 300"; Mackowski speculates that McPherson's reported Confederate casualties may be inflated by the inclusion of captured Confederate civilian volunteers. Woodworth estimates that the Confederate loss was over double of that of the Union. Union troops captured 17 cannons during the battle. The Confederate troops captured during the battle were paroled rather than held as prisoners. This decision both freed Sherman from having to bring prisoners along with his corps on the march, and was intended to encourage lenient treatment of wounded Union soldiers left in Jackson when Sherman marched out.

Before the Confederates abandoned the town, they set fire to supplies the soldiers had been unable to carry off in the evacuation; Union soldiers worked at putting these out when they entered Jackson. Grant spent the night at a local hotel, and was told that his room was the one that Johnston had spent the previous night in. Mower's brigade was assigned to serve as a provost guard, and the other Union troops were ordered to take up positions for defense. Despite precautions, the situation in the city soon turned chaotic. Officers of Union units short on rations issued food captured in the city to their men. The 31st Iowa Infantry Regiment was quartered in the Mississippi State Capitol and held a mock legislature in the room where the Mississippi Secession Ordinance had been approved. Government buildings in Jackson were damaged, including the Institute for the Blind and the insane asylum. Sherman made efforts to curb the chaos, but the destruction continued through the night. The pillage extended to civilian homes, and some of the residents of Jackson partook in the destruction as well. The Confederate authorities had released the inmates of the state penitentiary; the inmates then burned down the prison buildings.

Aware of Pemberton's presence west of Jackson and Johnston's troops north of the city, Grant expected that the two Confederate armies would try to combine against him; this expectation was strengthened by receipt of the Confederate message diverted by the spy. Late on May 14, Grant sent McClernand orders to "turn all your forces toward [Bolton]". McPherson was ordered to move west to support McClernand, and Sherman's corps was tasked with remaining in Jackson on May 15 and destroying the infrastructure and manufacturing facilities in the city. Grant and Sherman personally visited a textiles plant before Sherman ordered its destruction on a suggestion from Grant. The railroads that ran through Jackson were destroyed by burning the railroad ties and heating and bending the railroad rails; the resulting bent rails were known as Sherman's neckties. Steele's division destroyed the tracks south and east of Jackson, and Tuttle's division performed the destruction in the other two cardinal directions. The railroad bridge over the Pearl River was also destroyed. Banks, a hotel, a church, and hospitals also fell victim to the torch, despite Sherman targeting Confederate government property rather than private property. The posting of guards was insufficient to prevent the looting of stores. Union soldiers had acquired large quantities of near-worthless Confederate money and some paid for transactions with that.

=== Champion Hill and fall of Vicksburg (May 15–July 4) ===
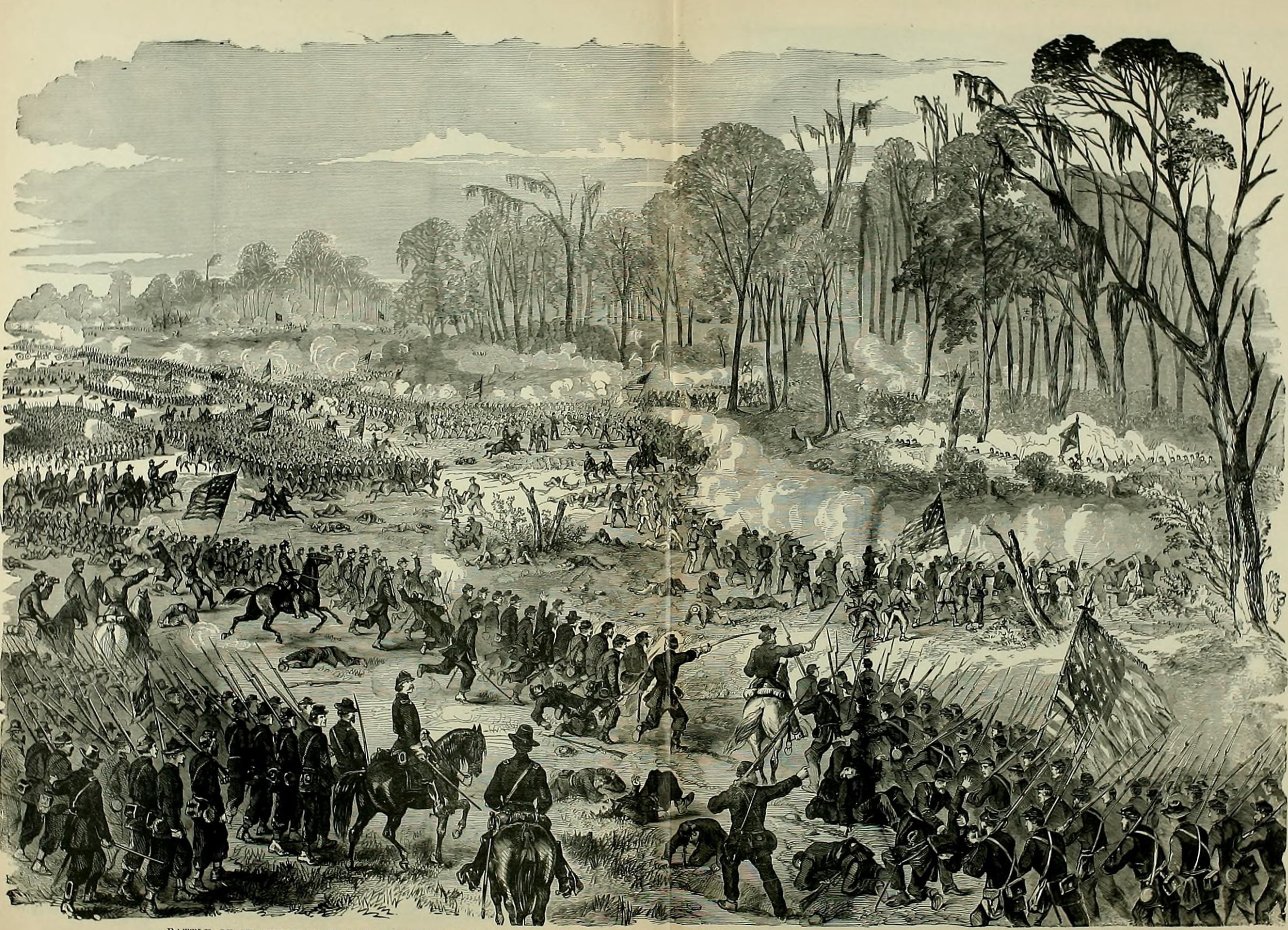
A 19th-century depiction of the fighting at Champion Hill

Bearss describes Grant's ability to prevent Johnston from gathering a significant force in the Union rear at Jackson as of "major significance to Grant and his campaign east of the Mississippi". On May 14, Pemberton received a copy of Johnston's May 13 message which had called for an offensive action by Pemberton in coordination with Johnston's soldiers. In accordance, Pemberton began a movement towards Edwards Station, but soon called it off due to concerns that it would end in disaster. A council of war came to the decision to strike Grant's supply line; the Confederates did not know that Grant did not have a traditional line of supply at this time except for a final train of 200 wagons. Johnston received word from Pemberton about this movement on May 15 and sent a response that Pemberton should move to Clinton to unite with Johnston's force, despite the fact that Johnston's troops were neither at Clinton nor headed there. During this time, the armies of Johnston and Pemberton were moving further apart. McClernand's troops moved west on May 15 from Raymond as the advance portion of Grant's army, successfully extricating themselves from an exposed position. Pemberton's troops moved out on the 15th in accordance with the plan to strike Grant's supply line. Meanwhile, McClernand and McPherson moved west on May 15, along with Blair's division of Sherman's corps. Sherman's two divisions at Jackson moved out of the city on the morning of May 16. McClernand and McPherson moved west on the morning of May 16 and made contact with Pemberton's force, bringing on the Battle of Champion Hill. Grant's forces won the ensuing battle, which Bearss describes as "the decisive and bloodiest engagement of the Vicksburg campaign". The following day, part of Pemberton's army which was holding a rear guard position east of the Big Black River was routed in the Battle of Big Black River Bridge.

On May 18, Union troops approached the Confederate fortifications at Vicksburg. Union assaults against the Confederate earthworks on May 19 and 22 failed, after which the Union troops settled in to siege operations known as the siege of Vicksburg. During the siege, reinforcements from across the Confederacy continued to be diverted to Johnston, who eventually amassed a significant force, known as the Army of Relief, which Bearss estimated at 31,000 men. All of these troops arrived by June 4. In early June, the combined forces of Pemberton and Johnston outnumbered Grant, but the Union commander continued to receive reinforcements and eventually outnumbered the Confederates. To protect against a move by Johnston to raise the siege, Grant created a defensive line facing Johnston, which was placed under the command of Sherman. Johnston's force did not move against Grant until July 1, and then upon nearing on July 3 the Union lines at the Big Black River, decided that the defenses could not be taken and did not bring on a battle. Pemberton surrendered on July 4. The fall of Vicksburg was a turning point of the war. Having learned of the surrender, Johnston ordered a retreat on July 5, and on July 7, Johnston's retreating troops reoccupied Jackson. Grant responded by sending Sherman with 46,000 men to follow Johnston. This movement, known as the Jackson Expedition, reached the city of July 10. The city was soon placed under siege; a limited Union attack that mistakenly occurred was repulsed on July 12. Johnston again abandoned Jackson on the night of July 16/17.

== Battlefield preservation ==
The landscape as it was during the battle has largely been obliterated by development. The City of Jackson preserves 2 acres (0.81 ha) of battlegrounds at Jackson: one in a public park known as Battlefield Park and another on the campus of the University of Mississippi Medical Center. The site at the university is remains of earthworks from the July siege. Mackowski, writing in 2022, described the site at Battlefield Park as "one of the few undeveloped spots where a visitor can walk the ground where part of the battle of Jackson took place". He also noted that the interpretive materials placed by the United Daughters of the Confederacy identify the earthworks at the park as the Confederate entrenchments built around Jackson, but they are actually Union works from the July siege. The cannons present in the park as of Mackowski's writing were from the Spanish–American War, rather than the time of the battle. The Wright house no longer exists.
