= Edgar A. Bras =

American soldier (1841–1923)

- Born: October 6, 1841; Jefferson County, Iowa
- Died: June 24, 1923 (aged 81); Florida
- Burial place: Evergreen Cemetery, Fort Lauderdale, Florida
- Military career
- Allegiance: United States of America
- Branch: United States Army
- Service years: 1861 – 1866
- Rank: First Sergeant
- Unit: 8th Regiment Iowa Volunteer Infantry
- Conflicts: American Civil War: Battle of Shiloh; Siege of Corinth; Second Battle of Corinth; Siege of Vicksburg; Red River Campaign; Battle of Spanish Fort
- Awards: Medal of Honor

Edgar A. Bras (October 6, 1841 – June 24, 1923) was a United States soldier who fought with the 8th Iowa Volunteer Infantry Regiment during the American Civil War. He received his nation's highest award for valor, the U.S. Medal of Honor, for the bravery he displayed during the Battle of Spanish Fort in Alabama on April 8, 1865. That award was conferred on June 8, 1865.

== Formative years ==
Born on October 6, 1841, in Jefferson Township, in Louisa County, Iowa, Edgar A. Bras was a son of Massachusetts native and farmer John Bras and Claretta/Mary (Means) Bras. a native of New York. In 1850, he resided in Jefferson Township with his parents and siblings: Letitia (aged 13), Mary (aged 11), Alexander (aged 7), Garry (aged 5), and Amanda (aged 2).

By 1860, he was still residing with his parents in Jefferson Township. Also still at home were siblings: Mary, Alexander, Garry, and Amanda, as well as sister Lucy (aged 9), and twin brothers Charlie and Henry (aged 7).

== Civil War ==
At the age of 20, Edgar A. Bras enrolled for Civil War military service in Louisa County, Iowa on September 11, 1861. He then officially mustered in for duty with Company K of the 8th Iowa Volunteer Infantry. Military records at the time described him as being 5’8” tall, with dark hair and blues eyes. He was then promoted to the rank of Fifth Corporal on December 7, 1861.

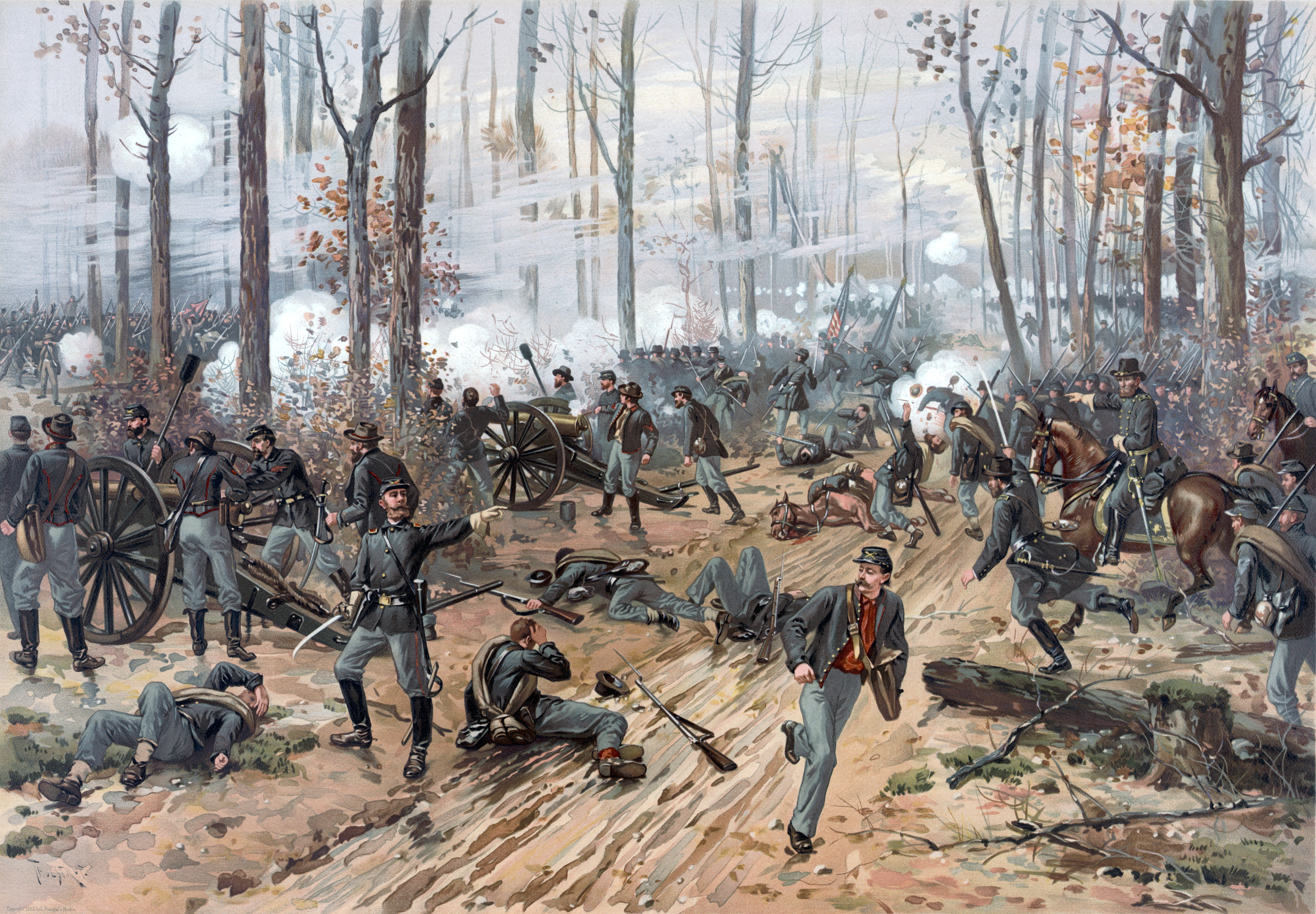
The Battle of Shiloh, where Bras was wounded

Engaged with his regiment in several of the most intense actions of the American Civil War, he was wounded multiple times in combat. On April 6, 1862, he sustained a bullet wound to his upper thigh while fighting with his regiment in the Battle of Shiloh, Tennessee. Because surgeons elected not to remove the projectile, he carried the bullet around with him in his leg for the remainder of his life. In recognition of his service to the regiment, he was subsequently promoted to the rank of Fourth Corporal on September 29, 1862. He was then wounded a second time during the second Battle of Corinth, Mississippi, on October 4, 1862. That bullet struck him in the head and lodged behind his left eye.

Once again, in recognition of his service to the regiment, he was promoted — first to the rank of Fourth Sergeant on March 1, 1863, and then to the rank of Third Sergeant on September 1, 1863. Upon expiration of his initial term of service, he then re-enlisted, mustering in again with the same regiment on January 11, 1864. He was also later promoted to the rank of First Sergeant on February 1, 1864.

On April 8, 1865, during the Battle of Spanish Fort, one of the efforts by Union forces to capture the forts protecting the city of Mobile, Alabama, Bras charged through the Confederate camp, capturing a flag from a color-bearer. It is for this act of bravery that he was awarded the Medal of Honor.

He was honorably discharged from the military at Selma, Alabama on April 20, 1866.

== Post-war life ==
Following his honorable discharge from the military, Bras pursued farming, moving from Iowa to Kansas, Nebraska, Oklahoma, and Florida in search of a better life. His U.S. Civil War Pension rate rose steadily throughout this phase of his life in recognition of his increasing level of disability, which was directly attributable to the injuries he sustained during the American Civil War. In 1870, he was an unmarried farmer residing in Big Sandy, Jefferson County, Nebraska.

By 1880, he and his wife had relocated to Marshall County, Kansas, where they resided in the District of Wells with their son Lester (aged 7), and daughters Gertrude (aged 5) and Olive (aged 3). Bras supported his family by farming the land. Still residing in Marshall County, Kansas by the 1890s, but now residing in the District of Elm Creek, he and his wife witnessed the Marshall County marriage of their 19-year-old daughter Gertrude to 31-year-old farmer Stephen Jester on January 25, of that year.

By 1910, he had been married for 38 years, was employed as a carpenter, and had relocated to Stillwater, Oklahoma, where he resided with his wife and daughter Ethel (aged 26), and her nine-year-old son, Oliver.

After relocating to Broward County, Florida with his wife and daughter, Ethel, Bras and his wife were documented in 1920, as residing with their daughter and her husband, Herbert Otto, at their Fort Lauderdale home. During this time, Bras became a deacon and superintendent of the Sunday School at that community's First Baptist Church. His wife then preceded him in death.

== Death and interment ==
Bras died in Florida on June 24, 1923, and was laid to rest at the Evergreen Cemetery in Fort Lauderdale.

== Medal of Honor citation ==
Bras was awarded the U.S. Medal of Honor for his bravery at Mobile, Alabama on April 8, 1865, during an engagement of his regiment in which he captured the colors of a Confederate army unit. According to the State Historical Society of Iowa, General Order No. 24 was issued by headquarters of the 16th U.S. Army Corps in Montgomery, Alabama on July 6, 1865, to recognize the valor of Bras and others from his regiment, and directed that:

The Eighth Iowa Infantry Veteran Volunteers be paraded on Saturday, July 8, 1865, at 5 p.m. ... and that the medals be presented to the proper persons, in the name of the honorable Secretary of War. Lieut. Col. J. J. Lyon, assistant inspector-general, Sixteenth Army Corps, is charged with the presentation and the execution of this order.

By order of Maj. Gen. A. J. Smith

== See also ==
- Iowa in the American Civil War
- List of Medal of Honor recipients
- List of American Civil War Medal of Honor recipients: A–F
