= Quatre Bras (disambiguation) =

Quatre Bras is a crossroads in Wallonia, Belgium, midway between Brussels and Charleroi, where the penultimate Napoleonic battle was fought in 1815.

Quatre Bras (French for "four arms" and a common name for a crossroads), may also refer to:

- Battle of Quatre Bras (1815), fought two days before Waterloo between the left wing of Napoleon's Armée du Nord under Marshal Michel Ney and Wellington's Anglo-Dutch army
  - Quatre Bras order of battle
  - Quatre Bras: Stalemate on the Brussels Road, a 1976 board wargame that simulates the battle
- Quatre Bras, Tervuren, a crossroads in Tervuren, Belgium, immediately east of Brussels, between the Avenue de Tervueren (Brussels-Tervuren road) and the outer ring road R0
- The name of Four Arms in the Dutch-language version of Ben 10
