= Bras (surname) =

Bras is a surname. Notable people with the surname include:

- Edgar A. Bras (1841–1923), Union Army officer and Medal of Honor recipient
- Mart Bras (born 1950), Dutch water polo player
- Martine Bras (born 1978), Dutch cyclist
- Michel Bras (born 1946), French chef
- Rafael L. Bras (born 1950), Puerto Rican civil engineer
