= Sherman's neckties =

Railroad destruction tactic used in the American Civil War

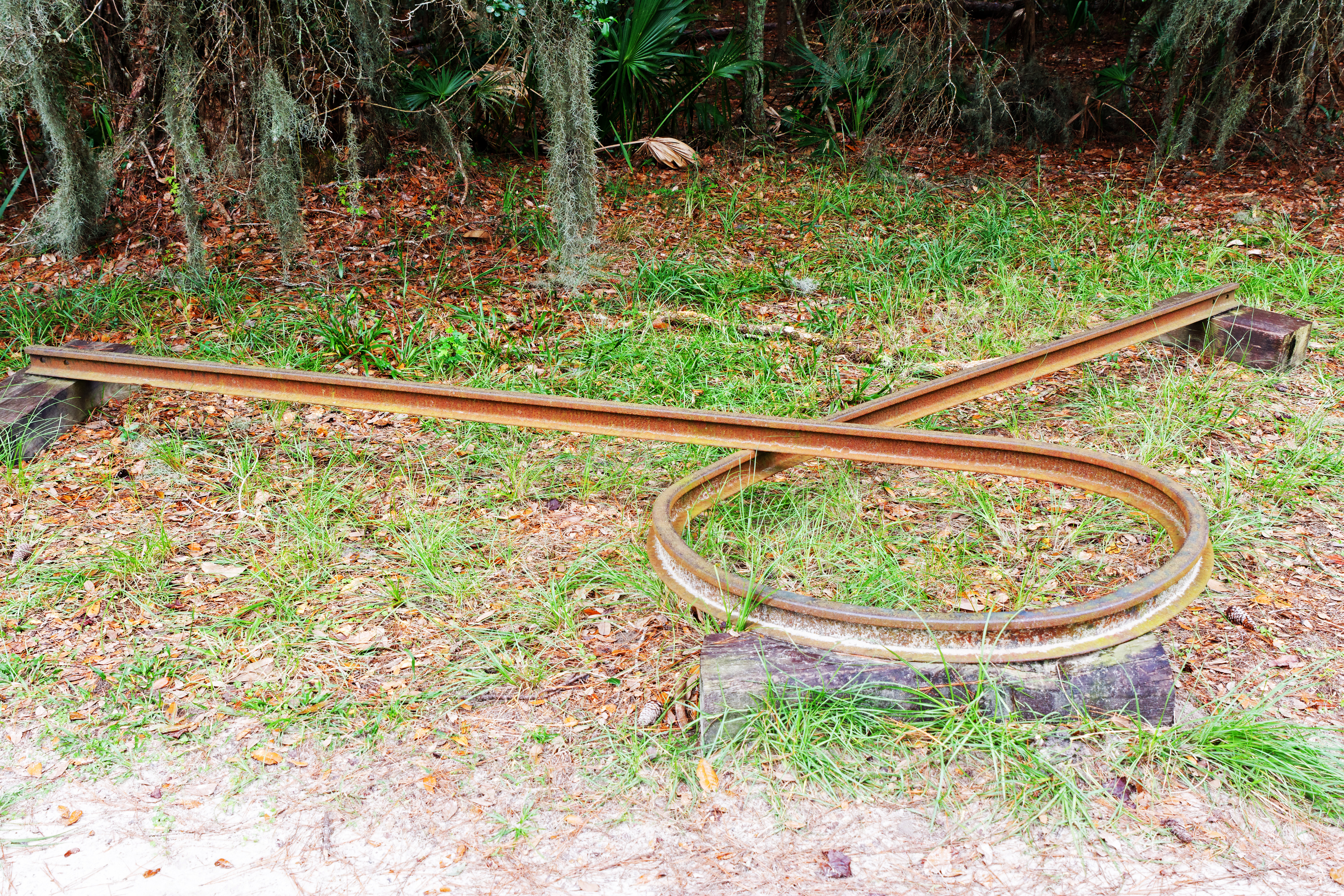
A Sherman necktie at Fort McAllister State Park, Georgia

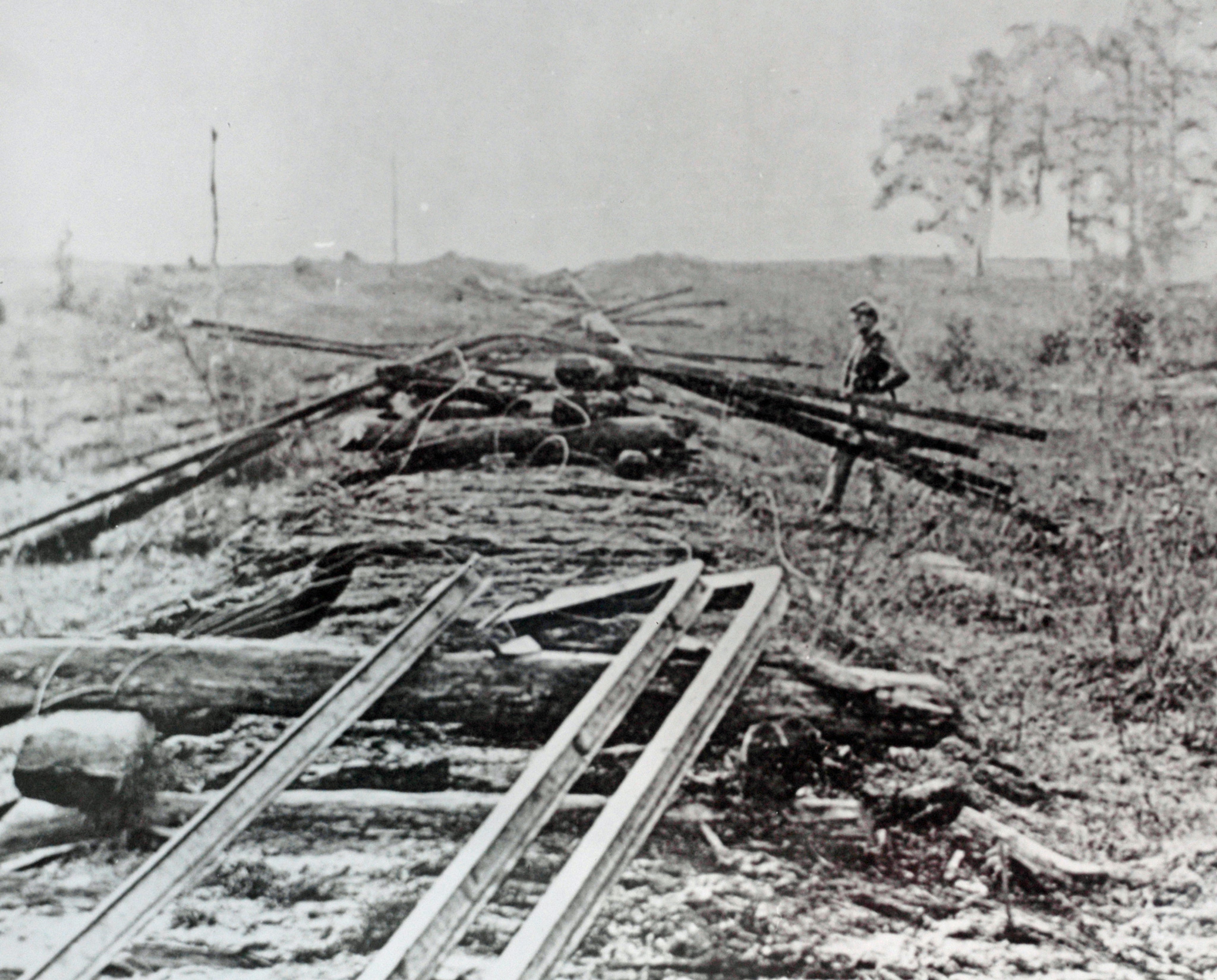
Some improperly-made Sherman's neckties. The rails have been bent, not twisted as Sherman ordered. In this state, they could potentially be repaired.

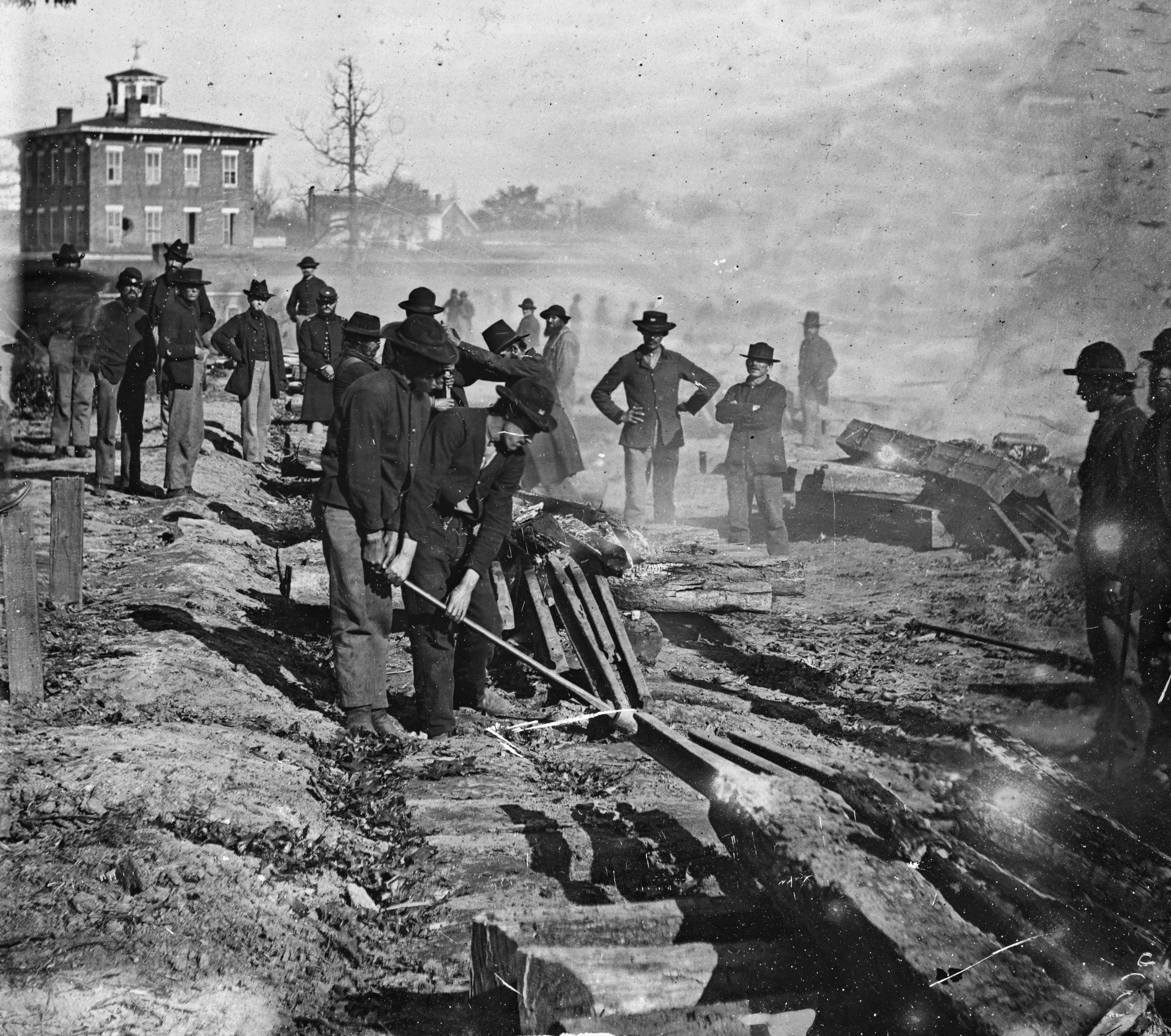
This photo by G.N. Barnard shows four men with crowbars twisting a rail, following Sherman's orders.

Sherman's neckties were a railway-destruction tactic used in the American Civil War. Named after Maj. Gen. William Tecumseh Sherman of the Union Army, Sherman's neckties were railway rails destroyed by heating them until they were malleable and twisting them into loops resembling neckties, often around trees. Since the Confederacy had limited supplies of iron, and few foundries to roll the rails, this destruction was very difficult to repair. They were also called Sherman's Bow Ties, Jeff Davis's Neckties, and Sherman Hairpins.

Although the destruction was ordered by Sherman during his Atlanta campaign, the "necktie" shape formed by bending the rails around a tree was not; his orders specified a different method of track destruction which was not as popular:

In case of the sounds of serious battle [Major-General McPherson] will close in on General Schofield but otherwise will keep every man of his command at work in destroying the railroad by tearing up track, burning the ties and iron, and twisting the bars when hot. Officers should be instructed that bars simply bent may be used again, but when red hot they are twisted out of line they cannot be used again. Pile the ties into shape for a bonfire, put the rails across and when red hot in the middle, let a man at each end twist the bar so that its surface becomes spiral.

— Wm. T. Sherman, Special Field Orders, July 18, 1864.

After three days, only one Confederate railroad line leading into Atlanta remained intact.

Sherman's neckties were also a feature of Sherman's March to the Sea, a campaign designed to bring hard war, or "serious destruction of infrastructure", to the Confederate States of America. Sherman implemented "scorched earth" policies; he and Union Army commander Lt. Gen. Ulysses S. Grant believed that the Civil War would end only if the Confederacy's strategic, economic, and psychological capacities for warfare were decisively broken.

In the early days of the Franklin-Nashville Campaign of late 1864, the Confederates employed similar tactics against Sherman's supply line, the Western and Atlantic Railroad from Chattanooga to Atlanta. The rails deformed by fire were known to the soldiers of the Army of Tennessee as "Old Mrs. Lincoln's Hair Pins."

== See also ==
- Railroad plough
- Rail sabotage
