= Quatre Bras, Tervuren =

Road junction in Tervuren, Belgium

Quatre Bras (French: Quatre Bras de Tervueren; Dutch: Vierarmenkruispunt) is a crossroads in Tervuren, Belgium, between the Avenue de Tervueren (Brussels–Tervuren road) and the Brussels outer ring road (R0). It is a key location for vehicle traffic around Brussels.

A tunnel beneath the junction—the Quatre Bras tunnel—reopened to traffic in both directions in July 2019 after a closure caused by electrical infrastructure failure, prior to which it had been temporarily sealed due to safety issues.

== History ==
The name "Quatre Bras" (meaning "Four Arms") originated from an inn that stood at the crossroads in the past—a naming convention mirrored at other junctions in the region, such as Chien-Vert and Léonard.
