= 8th Iowa Infantry Regiment =

- Iowa state flag
- Active: August 31, 1861, to April 20, 1866
- Country: United States
- Allegiance: Union
- Branch: Infantry
- Engagements: Battle of Shiloh; Siege of Corinth; Siege of Vicksburg; Red River Campaign; Battle of Spanish Fort

The 8th Iowa Infantry Regiment was an infantry regiment that served in the Union Army during the American Civil War. It served mostly in the Western Theater with the Army of the Tennessee.

== Service ==
The 8th Iowa Infantry Regiment was organized at Davenport, Iowa and mustered into Federal service between August 31 and September 4, 1861. The unit left the state for St. Louis on September 25 of that year and was attached to Dept. of Missouri until March, 1862. The regiment was assigned to the 3rd Brigade, 2nd Division, Army of Tennessee for one month and then transferred to the 1st Brigade, 2nd Division, until July, 1862. Following the fighting in SE Tennessee and NE Mississippi, the regiment was assigned to the District of Corinth, Dept. of the Tennessee, 1st Brigade, XIII Army Corps. Following the exchange of Shiloh prisoners, the regiment returned to Davenport for reorganization December 20, 1862 – January 4, 1863. They were assigned to the District of St. Louis, Dept. of the Missouri, January–April, 1863. The Iowans returned to the Army of the Tennessee in the 3rd Brigade, 3rd Division, XV Army Corps, until December, 1863. They transferred to the 3rd Brigade, 1st Division, XVI Army Corps, until June, 1864, following which they moved to the District of Memphis, District of West Tennessee, until February, 1865. The 8th Iowas completed its service in the 3rd Brigade, 3rd Division, XVI Army Corps. The regiment was mustered out on April 20, 1866.

== Major Engagements ==
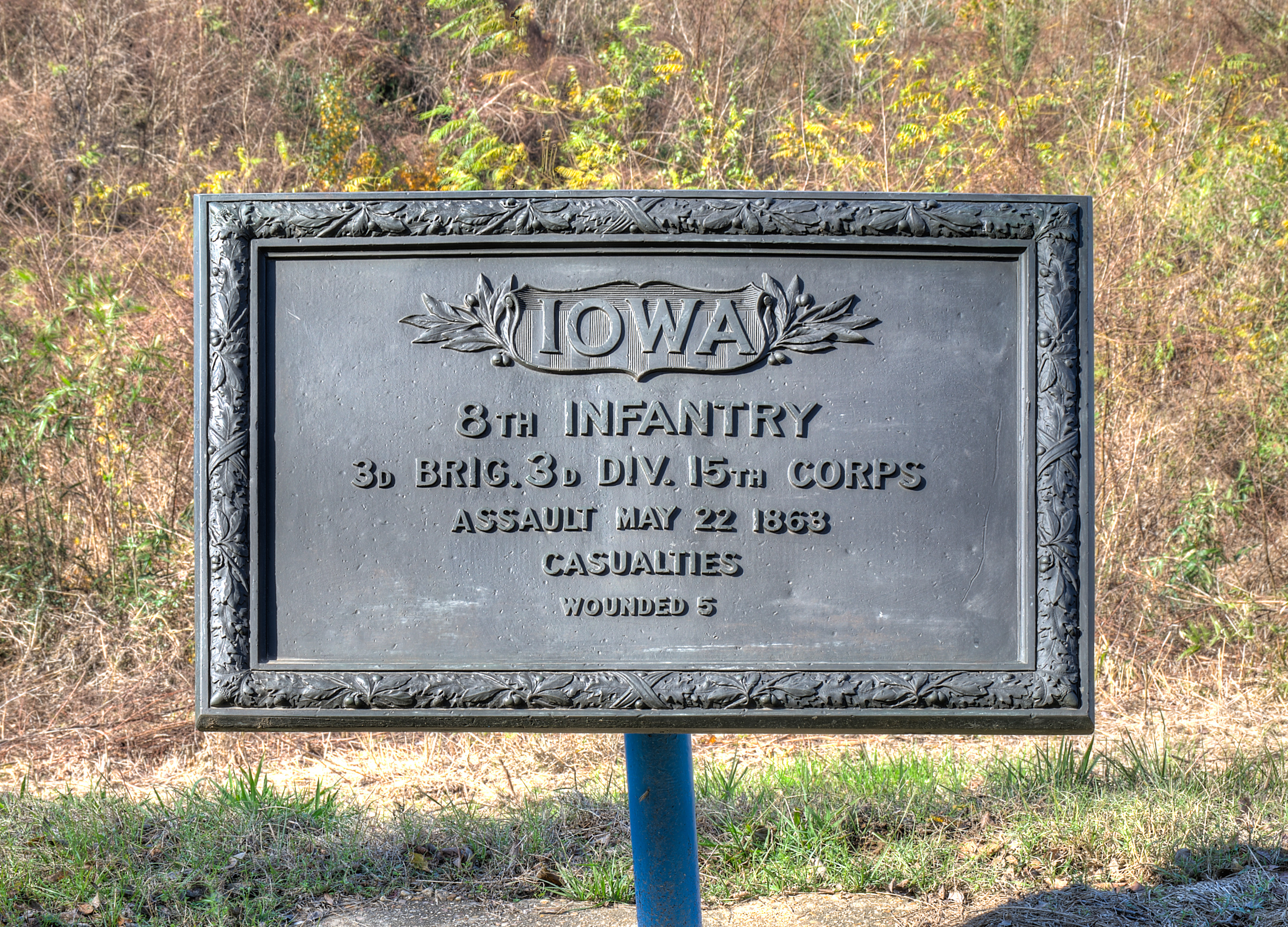
Position Marker at Vicksburg National Military Park

- Fremont's Campaign against Springfield, Mo., October 21-November 8.
- Battle of Shiloh (April 6–7, 1862), most of the regiment was captured, but were exchanged by November. Those not captured participated in the Siege of Corinth (April 29-May 30, 1862) and the subsequent Second Battle of Corinth in October.
- Siege of Vicksburg (May 18-July 4, 1863)
- Jackson Expedition (July 10–17, 1863)
- Red River Campaign March and Engagements (April 10-May 22, 1864)
- Mobile Campaign (1865) (March 7-April 13, 1865)

== Total strength and casualties ==
Total enrollment was 1589. The regiment lost 4 officers and 98 enlisted men who were killed in action or who died of their wounds and 4 officers and 170 enlisted men who died of disease, for a total of 276 fatalities. 228 were wounded.

== Commanders ==
- Colonel Frederick Steele
- Colonel James Lorraine Geddes

== See also ==
- List of Iowa Civil War Units
- Iowa in the American Civil War
