= Knoxville campaign order of battle: Union =

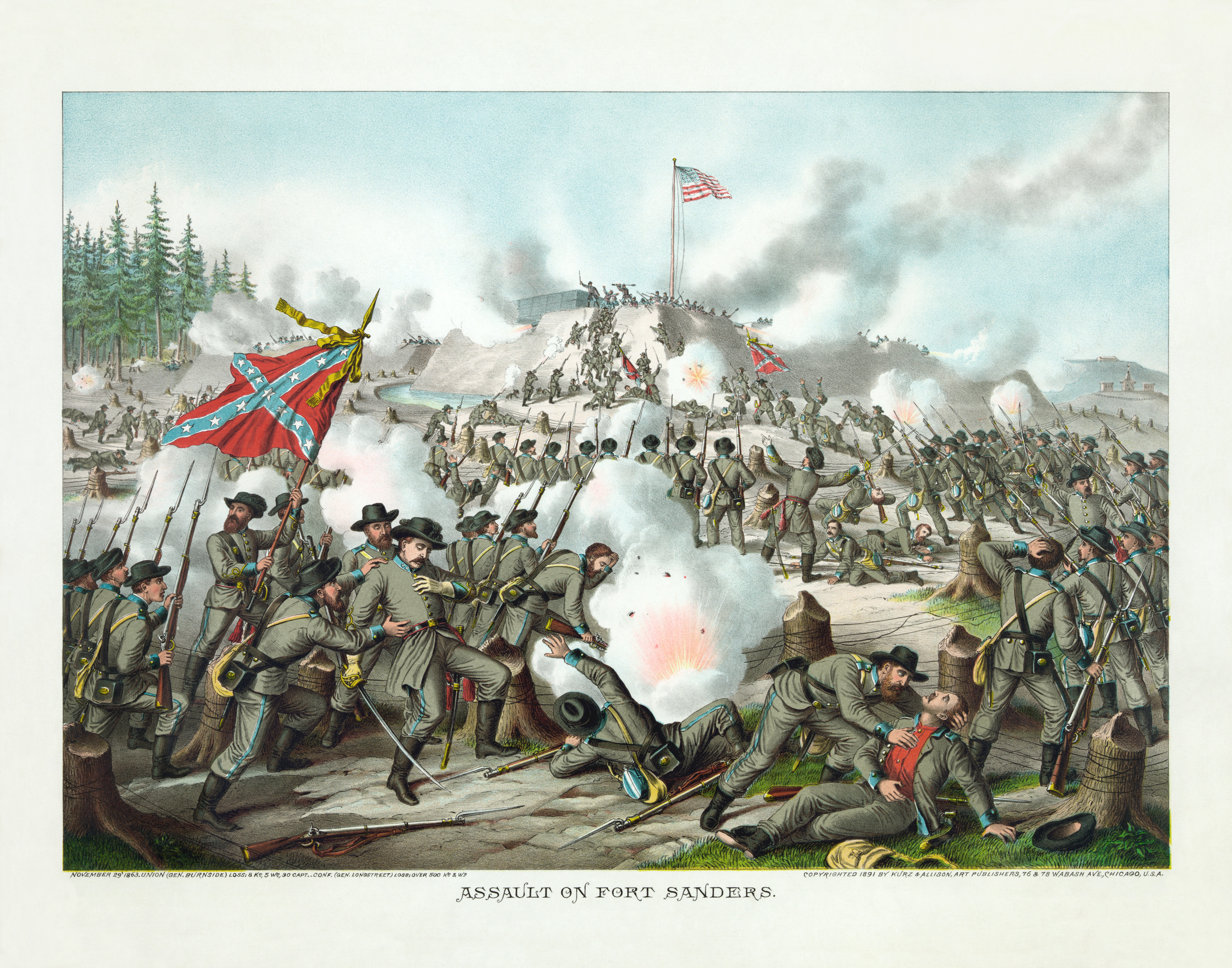
Confederate assault on Fort Sanders

The following Union Army units and commanders fought in the Knoxville Campaign and subsequent East Tennessee operations during the American Civil War from November 4 to December 23, 1863 under the command of Maj. Gen. Ambrose E. Burnside. Engagements fought during this time included the battles of Campbell's Station and Fort Sanders and the siege of Knoxville. Order of battle compiled from the army organization during the campaign and return of casualties. The Confederate order of battle is shown separately.

== Abbreviations used ==
=== Military rank ===
- MG = Major General
- BG = Brigadier General
- Col = Colonel
- Ltc = Lieutenant Colonel
- Maj = Major
- Cpt = Captain
- Lt = 1st Lieutenant

=== Other ===
- mw = mortally wounded
- k = killed

== Army of the Ohio ==
MG Ambrose E. Burnside (March 25–December 11, 1863)
MG John G. Foster (December 11, 1863 – February 9, 1864)

General Headquarters (Staff: 14 officers)

- Chief of Staff: MG John G. Parke
- Escort: 6th Indiana Cavalry: Col James Biddle

=== IX Corps ===
BG Robert B. Potter

Union IX Corps order of battle: October 1863
Division	Strength (Note: Strength numbers were from the October 1863 returns and represented officers and men "present for duty" and number of guns. The number of "aggregate present" was 20% larger for IX Corps and 16% larger for XXIII Corps.)	Brigade	Regiments and Others
First Division; BG Edward Ferrero	177 officers 2,863 men 10 guns	1st Brigade Col David Morrison	36th Massachusetts: Maj William E. Draper; 8th Michigan: Ltc Ralph Ely; 79th New York: Cpt William S. Montgomery; 45th Pennsylvania: Ltc Francis M. Hills
First Division; BG Edward Ferrero	177 officers 2,863 men 10 guns	2nd Brigade Col Benjamin C. Christ	29th Massachusetts: Col Ebenezer W. Pierce; 27th Michigan: Maj William B. Wright; 46th New York: Cpt Alphons Serieri; 50th Pennsylvania: Maj Edward Overton, Jr.
First Division; BG Edward Ferrero	177 officers 2,863 men 10 guns	3rd Brigade Col Daniel Leasure; Col William Humphrey	2nd Michigan: Maj Cornelius Byington (mw); 17th Michigan: Ltc Lorin L. Comstock (k); 20th Michigan: Maj Byron M. Cutcheon; 100th Pennsylvania: Ltc Matthew M. Dawson
First Division; BG Edward Ferrero	177 officers 2,863 men 10 guns	Artillery	34th New York Battery: Cpt Jacob Roemer four 3-inch Ordnance rifles; Battery D, 1st Rhode Island: Cpt William W. Buckley six 12-pounder Napoleons
Second Division; Col Joshua K. Sigfried; Col John F. Hartranft	150 officers 2,746 men 17 guns	1st Brigade Col Thomas B. Allard; Col Joshua K. Sigfried	2nd Maryland: Col Thomas B. Allard; 21st Massachusetts: Ltc George P. Hawkes; 48th Pennsylvania: Maj Joseph A. Gilmour
Second Division; Col Joshua K. Sigfried; Col John F. Hartranft	150 officers 2,746 men 17 guns	2nd Brigade Ltc Edwin Schall	35th Massachusetts: Maj Nathaniel Wales; 11th New Hampshire: Cpt Leander W. Cogswell; 51st Pennsylvania: Maj William J. Bolton
Second Division; Col Joshua K. Sigfried; Col John F. Hartranft	150 officers 2,746 men 17 guns	3rd Brigade Col Wilson C. Lemert (Note: The 3rd Brigade, 2nd Division, IX Corps garrisoned Cumberland Gap during the campaign.)	86th Ohio: Maj William Kraus; 129th Ohio: Col Howard D. John; 22nd Ohio Battery: Lt Amos B. Alger; 4th Ohio Cavalry Battalion: Maj Joseph T. Wheeler
Second Division; Col Joshua K. Sigfried; Col John F. Hartranft	150 officers 2,746 men 17 guns	Artillery	15th Indiana Battery: Cpt John C. H. von Sehlen 3-inch Ordnance rifles; Batteries L and M, 3rd U.S. Artillery: Lt Erskine Gittings four 10-pounder Parrott rifles; Battery E, 2nd U.S. Artillery: Lt Samuel N. Benjamin four 20-pounder Parrott rifles
Unassigned (Note: Unassigned IX Corps units were reassigned as shown in italics.)	31 officers 551 men 4 guns	not brigaded	79th New York (re-assigned to 1st Brigade, 1st Division); Battery E, 2nd U.S. Artillery (re-assigned to Artillery, 2nd Division); 6th Indiana Cavalry (assigned as headquarters escort)

=== XXIII Corps ===
BG Mahlon D. Manson (September 24–December 20, 1863)
Jacob Dolson Cox (December 21, 1863 – February 8, 1864)

General Headquarters (Staff and escort: 14 officers, 95 men)

- Chief of Engineers: Col Orlando M. Poe
- McLaughlin's Ohio Cavalry Squadron: Maj Richard Rice

Union XXIII Corps order of battle: October 1863
Division	Strength	Brigade	Regiments and Others
First Division; BG Jeremiah Boyle (Note: The 1st Division, XXIII Corps garrisoned various locations in Kentucky.)	450 officers 9,659 men 96 guns	Kentucky garrisons	various units
Second Division; BG Julius White	191 officers 3,308 men 12 guns	1st Brigade Col Samuel R. Mott (Note: The 1st Brigade, 2nd Division, XXIII Corps was isolated at Kingston on November 15. It repelled an attack by Wheeler's cavalry on November 24 and held its position until Knoxville was relieved.)	80th Indiana Infantry: Col James L. Culbertson; 16th Kentucky Infantry: Col James W. Gault; 25th Michigan Infantry: Cpt Samuel L. Demarest; 118th Ohio Infantry: Ltc Thomas L. Young; Elgin Illinois Battery: Cpt Andrew M. Wood six guns; 1st Tennessee Mounted Infantry: Col Robert K. Byrd (Note: The 1st Tennessee Infantry (mounted) at Kingston was detached from the Cavalry Corps.)
Second Division; BG Julius White	191 officers 3,308 men 12 guns	2nd Brigade Col Marshall W. Chapin	107th Illinois: Ltc Francis H. Lowry; 13th Kentucky: Col William E. Hobson; 23rd Michigan: Maj William W. Wheeler; 111th Ohio Infantry: Colonel John R. Bond, Maj Isaac R. Sherwood; Henshaw's Illinois Battery: Cpt Edward C. Henshaw two 3.8-inch James rifles, four 6-pounder brass guns
Third Division; BG Milo S. Hascall	168 officers 3,646 men 16 guns	1st Brigade Col James W. Reilly	44th Ohio: Maj Alpheus S. Moore; 100th Ohio: Col Patrick S. Slevin; 104th Ohio: Ltc Oscar W. Sterl; Battery D, 1st Ohio: Lt William H. Pease four 3-inch Ordnance rifles
Third Division; BG Milo S. Hascall	168 officers 3,646 men 16 guns	2nd Brigade Col Daniel Cameron	65th Illinois: Ltc William S. Stewart; 24th Kentucky: Col John S. Hunt; 103rd Ohio: Cpt John T. Philpot; Rigby's Indiana Battery: Cpt Hubbard T. Thomas six 3-inch Ordnance rifles
Corps Artillery	12 officers 290 men 12 guns	Reserve Artillery Cpt Andrew J. Konkle	24th Indiana Battery: Cpt Joseph A. Sims 3.8-inch James rifles; 19th Ohio Battery: Cpt Joseph C. Shields six 12-pounder Napoleons
Engineers	3 officers, 185 men	Not brigaded	Engineer Battalion: Cpt Oliver S. McClure
Unattached	Strength listed under Left Wing Forces	Provisional Brigade Col William A. Hoskins	12th Kentucky: Ltc Lawrence H. Rousseau, Maj Joseph M. Owens; 8th Tennessee: Col Felix A. Reeve

=== Cavalry Corps ===
BG James M. Shackelford
BG Samuel D. Sturgis (December 12, 1863 – April 15, 1864)

Union Cavalry Corps order of battle: October 1863 (Note: Burnside reorganized the 4th Division, XXIII Corps into a cavalry corps at the end of October 1863)
Division	Strength	Brigade	Regiments and Others
First Division; BG William P. Sanders (mw) (Note: Sanders was mortally wounded November 18, 1863 at Knoxville.); Col Frank Wolford	345 officers 7,113 men 20 guns	1st Brigade Col Frank Wolford; Ltc Silas Adams	1st Kentucky Cavalry: Ltc Silas Adams; 12th Kentucky Cavalry: Maj James B. Harrison; Law's Howitzer Battery:
First Division; BG William P. Sanders (mw); Col Frank Wolford	345 officers 7,113 men 20 guns	2nd Brigade (Note: Bond's brigade was formerly the 2nd Brigade, 4th Division, XXIII Corps.) Ltc Emory S. Bond	112th Illinois Mounted Infantry: Maj Tristram T. Dow; 8th Michigan Cavalry: Maj Henry C. Edgerly; 45th Ohio Mounted Infantry: Col Benjamin Runkle; 15th Indiana Battery: Lt Alonzo D. Harvey
First Division; BG William P. Sanders (mw); Col Frank Wolford	345 officers 7,113 men 20 guns	3rd Brigade (Note: Pennebaker's brigade was formerly the 1st Brigade, 4th Division, XXIII Corps.) Col Charles D. Pennebaker	11th Kentucky Mounted Infantry: Col S. Palace Love; 27th Kentucky Mounted Infantry: Ltc John H. Ward
Second Division; Col John W. Foster	345 officers 7,113 men 20 guns	1st Brigade (Note: Garrard's brigade was formerly the 3rd Brigade, 4th Division, XXIII Corps led by Carter.) Col James P. T. Carter; Col Israel Garrard	2nd Ohio Cavalry: Ltc George A. Purington; 7th Ohio Cavalry: Maj James McIntyre; 2nd Tennessee Mounted Infantry: Maj Daniel A. Carpenter; Battery M, 2nd Illinois: Cpt John C. Phillips
Second Division; Col John W. Foster	345 officers 7,113 men 20 guns	2nd Brigade (Note: Graham's brigade was formerly the 4th Brigade, 4th Division, XXIII Corps led by Foster.) Col John W. Foster; Col Felix W. Graham; Col Horace Capron	14th Illinois Cavalry: Col Horace Capron; 5th Indiana Cavalry: Ltc Thomas H. Butler; 65th Indiana Mounted Infantry: Cpt Walter G. Hodge; 9th Ohio Cavalry: Maj William D. Hamilton; 8th Tennessee Cavalry: Maj John M. Sawyers; Colvin's Illinois Battery: Cpt John H. Colvin four guns

=== Left Wing Forces ===
BG Orlando B. Willcox

Union Left Wing order of battle: October 1863
Division	Strength	Brigade	Regiments and Others
Left Wing; BG Orlando B. Willcox	178 officers 4,213 men 16 guns	1st Brigade Col John R. Mahan	115th Indiana: Ltc Alfred J. Hawn; 116th Indiana: Col William C. Kise; 117th Indiana: Col Thomas J. Brady; 118th Indiana: Col George W. Jackson
Left Wing; BG Orlando B. Willcox	178 officers 4,213 men 16 guns	2nd Brigade Col William A. Hoskins	12th Kentucky: Maj Joseph M. Owens (Provisional Brigade, XXIII Corps); 103rd Ohio: Col John S. Casement (re-assigned to 2nd Brigade, 3rd Division, XXIII Corps); 8th Tennessee: Col Felix A. Reeve (Provisional Brigade, XXIII Corps)
Left Wing; BG Orlando B. Willcox	178 officers 4,213 men 16 guns	Not brigaded	3rd Indiana Cavalry, Company L: Cpt Oliver M. Powers; 3rd Indiana Cavalry, Company M: Cpt Charles U. Patton; 23rd Indiana Battery: Cpt James H. Myers; 12th Michigan Battery: Cpt Edward G. Hillier; 21st Ohio Battery: Cpt James W. Patterson
