= 65th Illinois Infantry Regiment =

65th Regiment Illinois Volunteer Infantry "The Second Scotch"
- Illinois state flag
- Active: May 1, 1862, to July 26, 1865
- Country: United States
- Allegiance: Union
- Branch: Infantry
- Engagements: Battle of Harpers Ferry (1862); Siege of Knoxville (1863); Atlanta campaign (1864); Battle of Franklin (1864); Battle of Nashville (1864); Carolinas campaign (1865)

The 65th Regiment Illinois Volunteer Infantry, nicknamed the "Second Scotch Regiment" was an infantry regiment that served in the Union Army during the American Civil War. The regiment mustered into service in May 1862 and was captured at the Battle of Harper's Ferry. After being paroled and exchanged, the regiment was sent to Kentucky and assigned to the XXIII Corps. The regiment participated in the Knoxville campaign, the Atlanta campaign, the Franklin–Nashville campaign, and the Carolinas campaign. The soldiers were mustered out in July 1865.

== Service ==
The 65th Illinois Infantry was organized at Camp Douglas at Chicago, Illinois and mustered into Federal service on May 1, 1862. Sent to western Virginia, it formed part of the Harper's Ferry garrison that surrendered to the Army of Northern Virginia in September 1862.

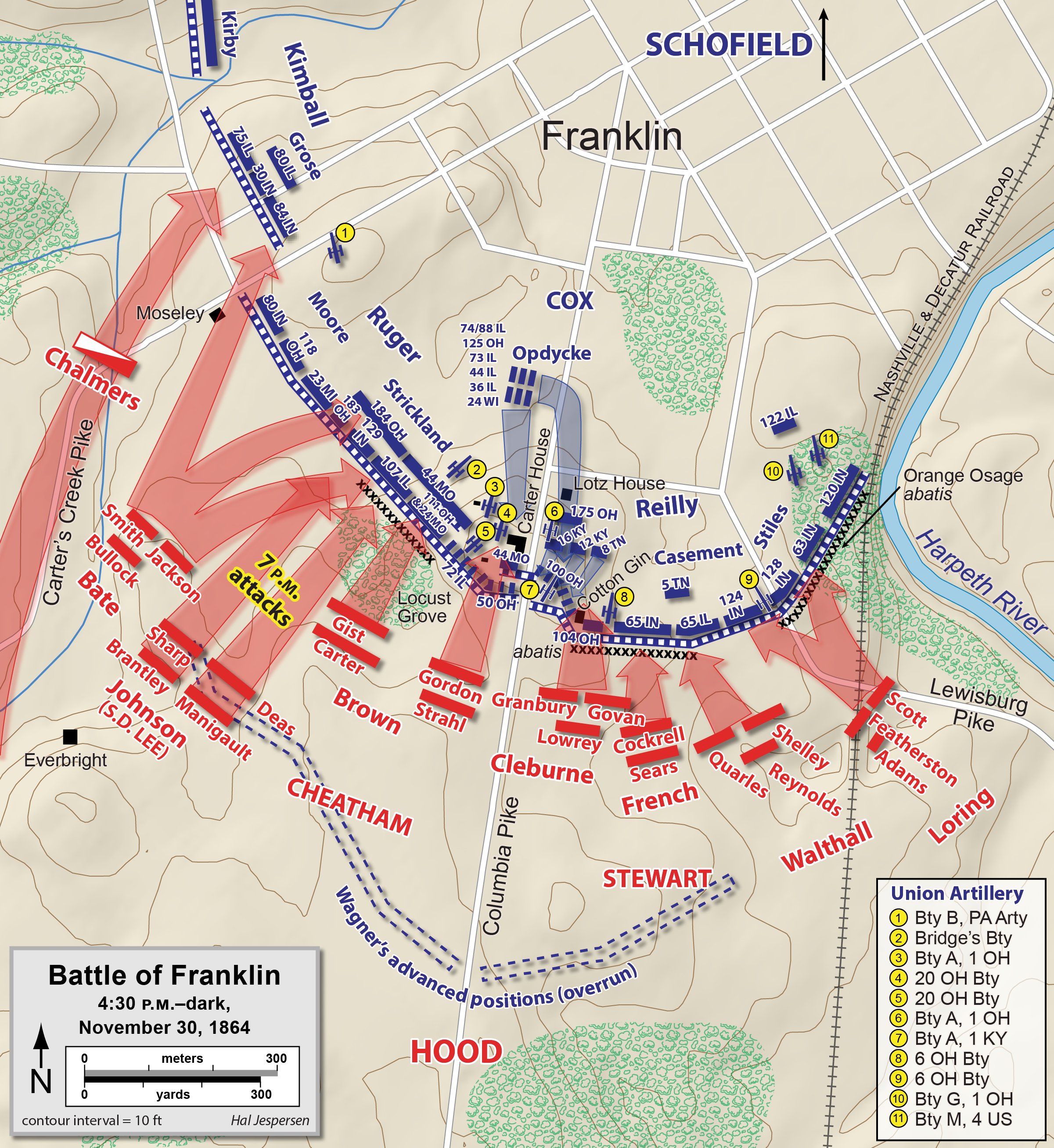
Confederate attacks and Opdycke's counterattack, 4:30–7 p.m. depicting regiment on Casement's line

After being paroled, the regiment was moved to Kentucky as part of the XXIII Corps and participated in the November–December 1863 Siege of Knoxville. In the spring of 1864, it joined in the Atlanta campaign and March to the Sea. When the Confederates under General John Hood headed north into Tennessee late in the year, the 65th was part of Col. John S. Casement's brigade, James W. Reilly's 3rd Division sent after him, joining in the battles at Franklin and Nashville. Its final assignment was duty in North Carolina.

The regiment was discharged from service on July 26, 1865.

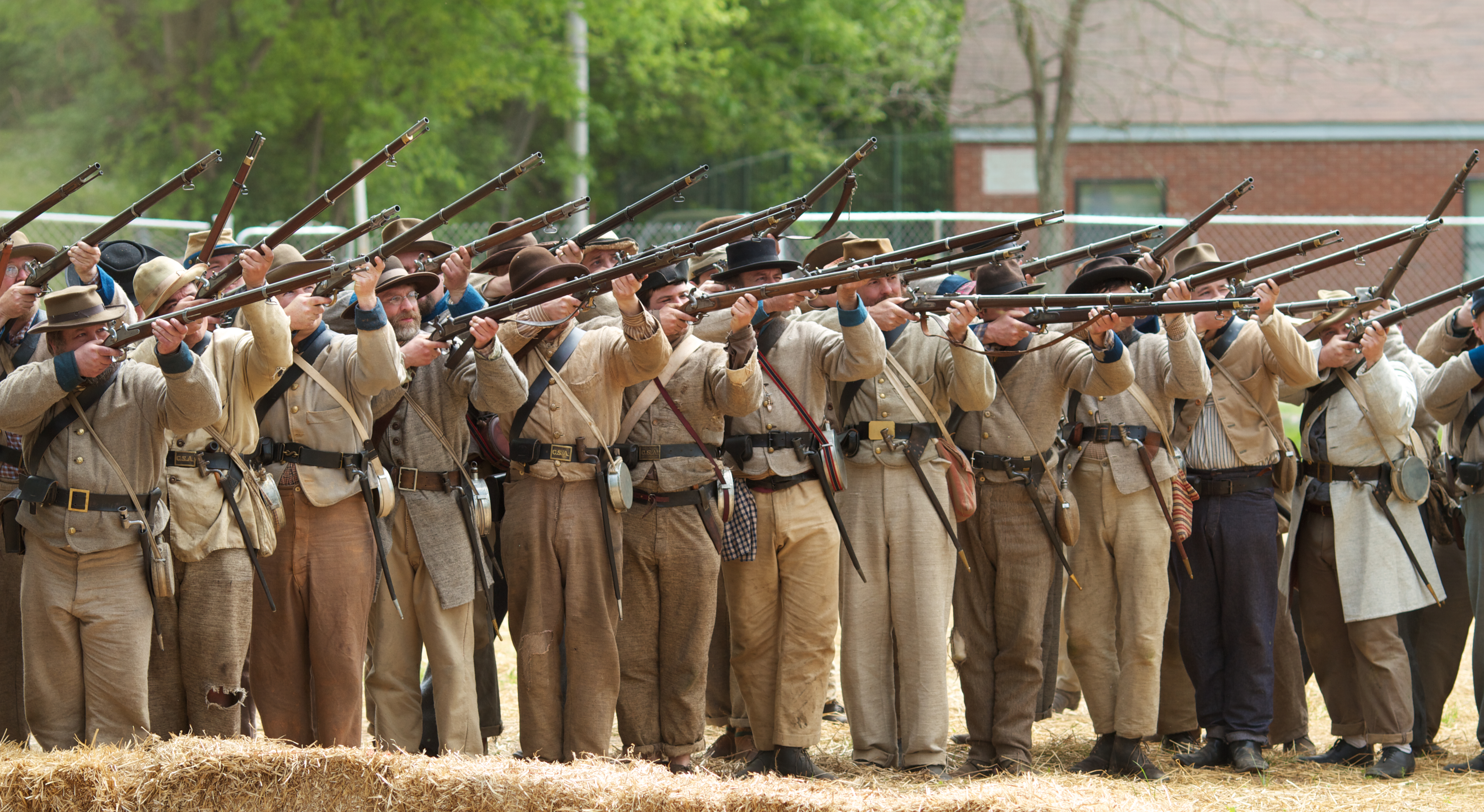
2010 Civil War reenactment, Carter House

== Total strength and casualties ==
The regiment suffered 1 officers and 30 enlisted men who were killed in action or mortally wounded and 1 officer and 97 enlisted men who died of disease, for a total of 129 fatalities.

== Commanders ==
- Colonel Daniel Cameron, Jr.
- Colonel William Scott Stewart

== See also ==
- List of Illinois Civil War Units
- Illinois in the American Civil War
- 12th Illinois Volunteer Infantry (The First Scotch Regiment)

== Popular culture ==
- Song: "We Are the Gay & Happy Suckers, from the State of Illinois" on IMSLP
