= George T. Anderson =

Confederate Army officer in the American Civil War

George Thomas Anderson
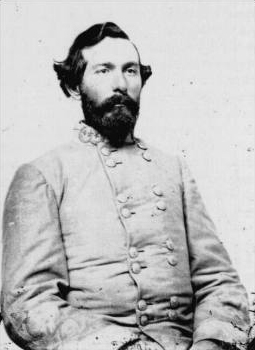
- Born: February 3, 1824; Covington, Georgia
- Died: April 4, 1901 (aged 77); Anniston, Alabama
- Burial place: Edgemont Cemetery; Anniston, Alabama
- Military career
- Allegiance: United States of America; Confederate States of America
- Branch: United States Army; Confederate States Army
- Service years: 1847–1848; 1855–1858 (USA); 1861–1865 (CSA)
- Rank: Captain (USA); Brigadier General (CSA)
- Nickname: "Tige"
- Units: Independent Company of Georgia Mounted Volunteers; 1st U.S. Cavalry
- Commands: 11th Georgia Infantry; Anderson's Brigade
- Conflicts: Mexican–American War; American Civil War: Battle of Yorktown; Seven Days Battles; Second Battle of Bull Run; Battle of South Mountain; Battle of Antietam; Battle of Fredericksburg; Battle of Gettysburg; Siege of Knoxville; Battle of the Wilderness; Battle of Spotsylvania Court House; Battle of Cold Harbor; Siege of Petersburg

George Thomas Anderson (February 3, 1824 – April 4, 1901) was a general in the Confederate States Army during the American Civil War. Nicknamed "Tige", Anderson was noted as one of Robert E. Lee's hardest-fighting subordinates.

== Early life and career ==
Anderson was born in Covington, Georgia, and attended Emory University before departing to serve as a second lieutenant of Georgia cavalry during the Mexican–American War. From 1848 until 1850, he was a major general of the 11th Division of the Georgia Militia. He received a commission as a captain in the 1st U.S. Cavalry in 1855, only to resign in 1858.

== Civil War service ==
When the Civil War broke out, Anderson joined the Confederate Army in the insurrection of his home state. He became colonel of the 11th Georgia Infantry regiment but arrived too late to participate in the First Battle of Bull Run. He saw battle during the Peninsula Campaign at Yorktown and commanded a brigade during the Seven Days Battles, Second Bull Run, Fox's Gap, Antietam, and Fredericksburg. He was promoted to brigadier general on November 1, 1862. Anderson missed Chancellorsville being with the majority of Lt. Gen. James Longstreet's First Corps operating in southeastern Virginia.

Longstreet's men rejoined the Army of Northern Virginia in time for the Gettysburg campaign. Anderson fought around Devil's Den and the Wheatfield at Gettysburg, where he was wounded. He recuperated in the Charleston area while Longstreet's Corps went to Georgia. Anderson did not rejoin his men until the Siege of Knoxville. He saw heavy action in 1864 at the Wilderness, Spotsylvania, Cold Harbor, and the operations around Richmond and Petersburg. He surrendered with Lee at Appomattox Court House in April 1865.

== Postbellum life ==
After the war, Anderson became a railroad freight agent and police chief in Atlanta, Georgia. He later moved to Anniston, Alabama, becoming police chief there and county tax collector. He died in Anniston on April 4, 1901. He is buried there in Edgemont Cemetery.

== See also ==
- List of American Civil War generals (Confederate)
