= Henshaw's Battery Illinois Light Artillery =

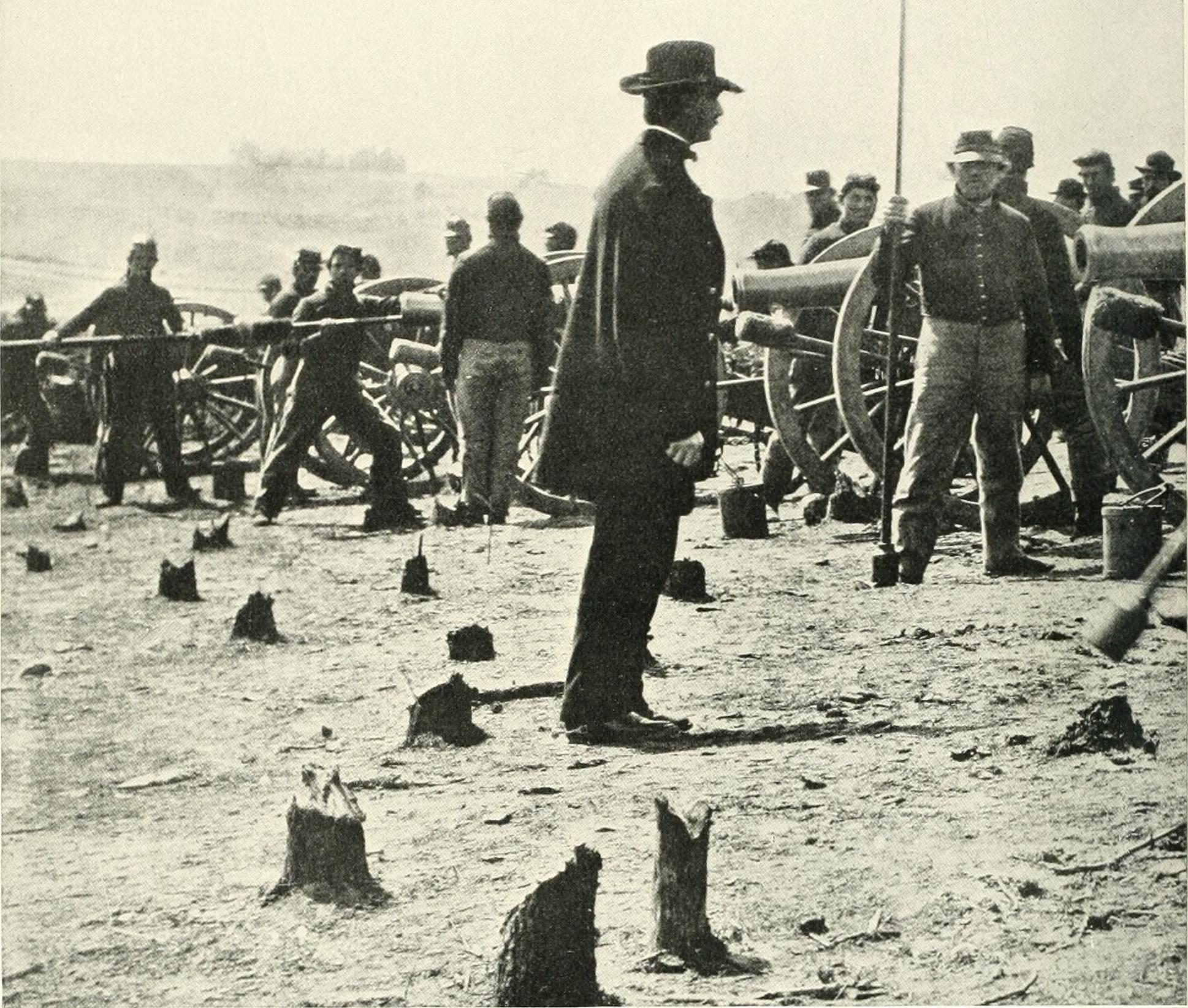
- Union artillery crews of an unknown battery pose for the camera in a wartime photograph.
- Active: 3 December 1862 – 18 July 1865
- Country: United States
- Allegiance: (United States) Union; Illinois
- Branch: Union Army
- Type: Field Artillery
- Size: Artillery Battery
- Equipment: 4 x M1841 6-pounder field guns 2 x 3.8-inch James rifles (Dec. 1863)
- Engagements: American Civil War; Battle of Buffington Island (1863); Battle of Salineville (1863); Knoxville campaign (1863); Battle of Campbell's Station (1863); Siege of Knoxville (1863)

Commanders
- Notable commanders: Edward C. Henshaw

Henshaw's Battery Illinois Light Artillery was an artillery battery from Illinois that served in the Union Army during the American Civil War. The battery was mustered into service in December 1862 and assigned to guard duty in Kentucky. In July 1863, the battery helped capture John Hunt Morgan's raiders at Buffington Island and Salineville. Beginning in August 1863, the unit took part in Ambrose Burnside's campaign in East Tennessee and the Knoxville campaign. It spent the rest of the war on garrison in east Tennessee before being mustered out of service in July 1865.

== Formation ==
Henshaw's Battery organized at Ottawa, Illinois and mustered into federal service on 3 December 1862. Its officers were Captain Edward C. Henshaw, First Lieutenants Azro C. Putnam and Aven Pearson, and Second Lieutenants John L. Morrison and Melvin B. Ross. All officers were from Ottawa. Serving as non-commissioned officers were First Sergeant Jefferson T. Lake, Quartermaster Sergeant Ole Larsen, four sergeants, eight corporals, two buglers, two artificers, and one wagoner. The non-coms were from Brookfield, Bruce, Columbus, Deer Park, Freedom, Hennepin, Morris, and Vienna, Illinois. There were 138 privates originally enlisted, while another 63 privates were recruited.

Captain Henshaw was cashiered on 14 December 1864, but this disability was removed on 2 March 1865. Henshaw was recommissioned captain on 4 April 1865. Larsen was replaced as quartermaster by Sergeant Osmond Tompkins. First Sergeant Lake and several privates joined the Veteran Reserve Corps. Private Charles C. Sutphin was promoted first lieutenant in the 3rd North Carolina Mounted Infantry on 13 March 1865. Private Isaac M. Southard was promoted second lieutenant in the 1st United States Colored Heavy Artillery Regiment.

== History ==
=== Organization ===
Ordered to Kentucky and attached to District of Western Kentucky, Dept. of the Ohio, to June, 1863. 1st Brigade, 3rd Division, 23rd Army Corps, Dept. Ohio, to August, 1863. 2nd Brigade, 2nd Division, 23rd Army Corps, to April, 1864. 3rd Brigade, 4th Division, 23rd Army Corps, to October, 1864. 2nd Brigade, 4th Division, 23rd Army Corps, to February, 1865. 2nd Brigade, 4th Division, District of East Tennessee, Dept. of the Cumberland, to July, 1865.

=== Service ===
Duty at Louisville and other points in District of Western Kentucky until August, 1863. Operations against and pursuit of Morgan July 2-26. Action at Buffington Island, Ohio, July 19. Paris, Ky., July 29 and August 1. Burnside's Campaign in East Tennessee August 16-October 17. Duty at Loudon until November. Knoxville Campaign November 4-December 23. Actions at Huff's Ferry November 14. Lenoir Station November 14-15. Loudon November 15. Campbell's Station November 17. Siege of Knoxville November 17-December 5. Pursuit of Longstreet December 7-13. At Strawberry Plains until January, 1864, and at Mossy Creek until April. Garrison duty at Loudon, Tenn., and other points in District of East Tennessee until July, 1865. Mustered out July 18, 1865.

== Casualties ==
During its service, Henshaw's Battery sustained losses of four enlisted men killed and 15 enlisted men dead from disease, a total of 19 fatalities. Private Lawrence Millard died of wounds at Louisville, Kentucky on 7 May 1863. Private Edward Jamison was killed at Buffington Island on 19 July 1863. Private Hugh Turney was killed near La Grange, Kentucky on 4 August 1863 while guarding the Louisville and Nashville Railroad. Corporal Daniel Wheeler was killed at Campbell's Station on 16 November 1863. Private Wallace Wilson drowned in the Tennessee River on 27 May 1865. Sergeant Robert M. Carr and Corporal Patrick O'Connor died of disease at Ottawa on 31 January and 10 February 1863. Two soldiers were claimed by other units from which they had deserted.

== Armament ==
At the Siege of Knoxville in December 1863, Henshaw's battery consisted of two 3.8-inch James rifles and four M1841 6-pounder field guns. It defended the fort on Temperance Hill and the nearby ridge.

== See also ==
- List of Illinois Civil War units
