= 24th Independent Battery Indiana Light Artillery =

- Active: November 29, 1862 – August 3, 1865
- Country: United States
- Allegiance: Union
- Branch: Artillery
- Engagements: Knoxville Campaign; Siege of Knoxville; Atlanta campaign Battle of Resaca; Battle of Dallas; Battle of New Hope Church; Battle of Allatoona; Battle of Kennesaw Mountain; Siege of Atlanta; Battle of Nashville

24th Indiana Battery Light Artillery was an artillery battery that served in the Union Army during the American Civil War.

== Service ==
The battery was organized at Indianapolis, Indiana and mustered in November 29, 1862, for a three-year enlistment.

The battery was attached to District of Western Kentucky, Department of the Ohio, to June 1863. 2nd Brigade, 3rd Division, XXIII Corps, Department of the Ohio, to August 1863. 2nd Brigade, 4th Division, XXIII Corps, to October 1863. Artillery Reserve, XXIII Corps, to April 1864. Artillery, 1st Division, XXIII Corps, to July 1864. Artillery, Cavalry Division, XXIII Corps, to August 1864. Artillery, 2nd Division, XXIII Corps, to October 1864. Garrison Artillery, Nashville, Tennessee, Department of the Cumberland, to January 1865. Garrison Artillery, Louisville, Kentucky, to July 1865.

The 24th Indiana Battery Light Artillery mustered out of service on August 3, 1865.

== Detailed service ==
Left Indiana for Louisville, Kentucky, March 13, 1863. Expedition to Monticello and operations in southeast Kentucky April 25-May 12, 1863. Horse Shoe Bend May 11. Duty at Columbia June 5–22, and at Glasgow until August. Pursuit of Morgan July 1–26. Marrow Bone, Burkesville, July 2. Burnside's Campaign in eastern Tennessee August 16-October 17. Philadelphia October 20. Knoxville Campaign November 4-December 23. Huff's Ferry November 14. Campbell's Station November 16, Siege of Knoxville November 17-December 5. Duty at Knoxville until April 1864. March to Charleston April 5–24. Atlanta Campaign May 1 to September 8, 1864. Demonstrations on Rocky Faced Ridge and Dalton May 8–13. Battle of Resaca May 14–15. Operations on line of Pumpkin Vine Creek and battles about Dallas, New Hope Church, and Allatoona Hills May 25-June 5. Operations about Marietta and against Kennesaw Mountain June 10-July 2. Lost Mountain June 15–17. Muddy Creek June 17. Assault on Kennesaw June 27. Transferred to Stoneman's Cavalry Division July 1. Nickajack Creek July 2–5. Chattahoochie River July 5–17. Stoneman's Raid to Macon July 27-August 6. Clinton and Macon July 30. Hillsboro, Sunshine Church, July 30–31. Regiment mostly captured. Siege of Atlanta August 6–25. Flank movement on Jonesboro August 25–30. Lovejoy's Station September 2–6. Pursuit of Hood into Alabama October 1–26. Garrison duty at Nashville, Tennessee, until January 1865. Battle of Nashville December 15–16. Ordered to Louisville, Kentucky, January 18, and Post duty there until July 28.

== Casualties ==
The battery lost a total of 31 enlisted men during service, all due to disease.

== Commanders ==
- Captain Joseph A. Sims
- 1st Lieutenant Hiram Allen - commanded at the battle of Nashville

== See also ==
- List of Indiana Civil War regiments
- Indiana in the Civil War
