= Battery D, 1st Ohio Light Artillery =

- Active: September 1861 to July 15, 1865
- Country: United States
- Allegiance: Union
- Branch: Artillery
- Engagements: Battle of Shiloh; Siege of Corinth; Battle of Munfordville; Battle of Perryville (1 section); Battle of Stones River (1 section); Tullahoma Campaign (1 section); Battle of Chickamauga (1 section); Siege of Knoxville; Atlanta campaign Battle of Resaca; Battle of Kennesaw Mountain; Battle of Atlanta; Siege of Atlanta; Battle of Jonesboro; Second Battle of Franklin; Battle of Nashville; Carolinas campaign

Battery D, 1st Ohio Light Artillery was an artillery battery that served in the Union Army during the American Civil War.

== Service ==
The battery was organized Camp Dennison near Cincinnati, Ohio in September 1861 and mustered in for a three-year enlistment on October 17, 1861. The regiment was organized as early as 1860 under Ohio's militia laws, under Colonel James Barnett.

The battery was attached to Nelson's Command, Mt. Sterling, Kentucky, to December 1861. Artillery, 2nd Division, Army of the Ohio, to February 1862. Artillery, 4th Division, Army of the Ohio, to September 1862. Captured at Munfordville, Kentucky. 33rd Brigade, 10th Division, I Corps, Army of the Ohio, to November 1862 (1 section). 2nd Brigade, Cavalry Division, Army of the Cumberland, to December 1862 (section). Artillery, 1st Cavalry Division, Army of the Cumberland, to March 1863. Artillery, 2nd Cavalry Division, Army of the Cumberland, to December 1863 (1 section). Battery at Columbus, Ohio, January to April 1863. 2nd Brigade, 1st Division, XXIII Corps, Army of the Ohio, to July 1863. 1st Brigade, 4th Division, XXIII Corps, to August 1863. 1st Brigade, 3rd Division, XXIII Corps, to April 1864. Artillery, 3rd Division, XXIII Corps, to February 1865. Artillery, 3rd Division, XXIII Corps, Department of North Carolina, to July 1865.

Battery D, 1st Ohio Light Artillery mustered out of service at Cleveland, Ohio on July 15, 1865.

== Detailed service ==
Moved to Mt. Sterling, Ky., October 1–10. Skirmish at West Liberty, Ky., October 23, 1861. Nelson's Expedition up the Big Sandy October 23-November 17. Ivy Creek November 7, Ivy Mountain November 8. Moved to Louisville, Ky., November 17–25; thence to Munfordville, Ky., November 28–29. Moved to Nashville, Tenn., February 13–25, 1862. Occupation of Nashville February 25. Moved to Pittsburg Landing, Tenn., March 18-April 6. Battle of Shiloh, April 7. Advance on and siege of Corinth, Miss., April 29-May 30. Occupation of Corinth May 30. Pursuit to Booneville October 31-June 12. Buell's Campaign in northern Alabama and middle Tennessee until August. March to Lebanon, thence to Munfordville, Ky., August 23-September 6. Siege of Munfordsville September 14–17. Battery captured September 17, except Newell's Section, which participated in the pursuit of Bragg into Kentucky October 1–15. Battle of Perryville, Ky., October 8. Assigned to duty with Minty's Cavalry Brigade November, 1862. Gallatin, Tenn., November 8. Lebanon November 9. Rural Hill November 15. Hollow Tree Gap December 4. Wilson's Creek Road December 11. Franklin December 12. Advance on Murfreesboro December 26–30. Lavergne December 26. Battle of Stones River December 30–31, 1862 and January 1–3, 1863. Stewart's Creek January 1, 1863. Lavergne January 1. Expedition against Forest January 9–19. Expedition to Franklin January 31-February 10. Unionville and Rover January 31. Rover February 13. Bradysville February 16. Expedition toward Columbia March 4–14. Rover March 4. Expedition from Franklin to Columbia March 8–12. Thompson's Station March 9. Rutherford Creek March 10–11. Expedition to Auburn, Liberty, Snow Hill, etc., April 2–6. Snow Hill, Woodbury, April 3. Franklin April 10. Expedition to McMinnville April 20–30. Near Murfreesboro June 3. Shelbyville Pike and operations on Edgefield Pike, near Murfreesboro, June 4. Marshall's Pass June 4. Scout on Middleton and Eagleville Pike June 10. Tullahoma Campaign June 23-July 7. Eagleville and Rover June 23. Middleton June 24. Fosterville, Guy's Gap and Shelbyville June 27. Occupation of middle Tennessee until August 16. Expedition to Huntsville July 13–22. Chickamauga Campaign August 16-September 22. Reconnaissance toward Rome, Ga., September 11. Alpine and Dirt Town, Lafayette Road, Chattanooga River, September 12. Reconnaissance toward Lafayette and skirmish September 13. Near Stevens' Gap September 18. Battle of Chickamauga September 19–21. Cotton's Ferry September 30. Anderson's Cross Roads October 2. Farmington October 7. Rejoined Battery at Knoxville, Tenn., December. Battery reorganized at Columbus, Ohio, January 1863. Ordered to Lexington, Ky., thence to Mt. Vernon, Ky., April 4–18. Saunder's Raid into eastern Tennessee June 14–24, Knoxville June 19–20. Strawberry Plains June 20. Powder Springs, Ga., June 21. Burnside's Campaign in eastern Tennessee August 16-October 17. Expedition to Cumberland Gap September 3–7. Operations about Cumberland Gap September 7–10. Knoxville Campaign November 4-December 23. Siege of Knoxville November 17-December 4. Reenlisted January 1864. Atlanta Campaign May to September 1864. Movements on Dalton May 5–8. Demonstration on Rocky Faced Ridge May 8–11. Battle of Resaca May 13–15. Cartersville May 20. Kingston May 24. Operations on line of Pumpkin Vine Creek and battles about Dallas, New Hope Church and Allatoona Hills May 25-June 5. Operations about Marietta and against Kennesaw Mountain June 10-July 2. Muddy Creek June 17. Noyes Creek June 19. Cheyney's Farm June 22. Olley's Farm June 26–27. Assault on Kennesaw June 27. Nickajack Creek July 2–5. Chattahoochie River July 6–17. Battle of Atlanta July 22. Siege of Atlanta July 22-August 25. Utoy Creek August 5–7. Flank movement on Jonesboro August 25–30. Battle of Jonesboro August 31-September 1. Lovejoy's Station September 2–6. Pursuit of Hood into Alabama October 3–26. Nashville Campaign November–December. Columbia, Duck River, November 24–27. Columbia Ford November 28–29. Franklin November 30. Battle of Nashville December 15–16. Pursuit of Hood to the Tennessee River December 17–28. Movement to North Carolina January 15-February 9, 1865. Fort Anderson February 18–19. Town Creek February 19–20. Capture of Wilmington February 22. Campaign of the Carolinas March 1-April 26. Advance on Goldsboro March 6–21. Occupation of Goldsboro March 21. Gulleys March 31. Advance on Raleigh April 10–14. Occupation of Raleigh April 14. Bennett's House April 26. Surrender of Johnston and his army. Duty at Raleigh and Greensboro, N.C., until July.

== Casualties ==
The battery lost a total of 36 men during service; 8 enlisted men killed or mortally wounded, 28 enlisted men died of disease.

== Commanders ==
- Captain Andrew J. Konkle - promoted to major, September 8, 1863
- Captain Giles J. Cockerill - commanded after the battery was reorganized
- Lieutenant Nathaniel M. Newell - commanded the only section not captured at Munfordville

== See also ==
- List of Ohio Civil War units
- Ohio in the Civil War
