= 20th Michigan Infantry Regiment =

- Michigan state flag
- Active: August 15, 1862, to May 30, 1865
- Country: United States
- Allegiance: Union
- Branch: Infantry
- Engagements: Battle of Fredericksburg; Siege of Vicksburg; Siege of Knoxville; Battle of the Wilderness; Battle of Spotsylvania Court House; Siege of Petersburg; Battle of the Crater; Appomattox Campaign

The 20th Michigan Infantry Regiment was an infantry regiment that served in the Union Army during the American Civil War.

== Service ==
The 20th Michigan Infantry was organized at Jackson, Michigan, between August 15 and August 19, 1862.

The regiment was mustered out of service on May 30, 1865.

The regiment is mentioned briefly in Chapter IX of MacKinlay Kantor's Pulitzer Prize-winning novel "Andersonville" (1955).

== Total strength and casualties ==
The regiment lost 13 officers and 111 enlisted men killed in action or mortally wounded, and a further 3 officers and 175 enlisted men who died of disease, a total of 302 fatalities.

== Commanders ==
- Colonel Adolphus Wesley Williams
- Colonel Byron M. Cutcheon

== See also ==
- List of Michigan Civil War Units
- Michigan in the American Civil War
