= 26th Independent Battery Indiana Light Artillery =

26th Independent Battery Indiana Light Artillery (Wilder's or Rigby's Battery)
- Active: May 1861 – July 19, 1865
- Country: United States
- Allegiance: Union
- Branch: Artillery
- Engagements: Battle of Cheat Mountain; Battle of McDowell; Battle of Cross Keys; Battle of Harpers Ferry; Knoxville Campaign; Stoneman's 1865 raid

Commanders
- Notable commanders: Silas F. Rigby; Hubbard T. Thomas

26th Indiana Battery Light Artillery was an artillery battery of the Union Army in the American Civil War. It was also known as Wilder's Battery

== Service ==
The battery was organized in May 1861, but was not accepted for the service. Instead, the recruits were mustered in as Company A, 17th Indiana Infantry on June 12, 1861, but retained their status as artillery. The battery was detached from the 17th Indiana Infantry in mid-September 1861.

The battery was attached to Reynolds' Cheat Mountain District, West Virginia, to November 1861. Milroy's Command, Cheat Mountain, West Virginia, to March 1862. Milroy's Cheat Mountain Brigade, Department of the Mountains, to June 1862. Milroy's Independent Brigade, I Corps, Army of Virginia, to July 1862. Piatt's Brigade, Winchester, Virginia, to August 1862. Trimble's Brigade, White's Division, Winchester, Virginia, to September 1862. Miles' Command, Harpers Ferry, West Virginia, September 1862. Camp Douglas, Illinois, and Indianapolis, Indiana, to March 1863. Central District of Kentucky, Department of the Ohio, to June 1863. 2nd Brigade, 1st Division, XXIII Corps, Army of the Ohio, to July 1863. 2nd Brigade, 4th Division, XXIII Corps, to August 1863. Reserve Artillery, XXIII Corps, to October 1863. 2nd Brigade, 3rd Division, XXIII Corps, to April 1864. 2nd Brigade, 4th Division, XXIII Corps, to February 1865. 2nd Brigade, 4th Division, District of East Tennessee, Department of the Cumberland, to March 1865. 1st Brigade, 4th Division, District of East Tennessee, to July 1865.

The 26th Indiana Battery Light Artillery mustered out of service on July 19, 1865.

== Detailed service ==
Left Indiana for Parkersburg, Virginia, July 2. Moved from Parkersburg, to Oakland July 23, 1861; then to Camp Pendleton and duty there until August 7. Moved to Cheat Mountain Pass and Elkwater August 7–13. Operations on Cheat Mountain September 11–17. Petersburg September 11–13. Cheat Mountain Pass September 12. Elkwater September 13. Greenbrier River October 3–4. Expedition to Camp Baldwin December 11–14. Allegheny Mountain December 13. Duty at Beverly until April 1862. Expedition on the Seneca April 1–12. Monterey April 12. Battle of McDowell May 8. Franklin May 10–12. Strasburg and Staunton Road June 1–2. Battle of Cross Keys June 8. Duty at Winchester until September 1. Defense of Harpers Ferry September 12–15. Bolivar Heights September 14. Surrendered September 15. Paroled and sent to Annapolis, Maryland, then to Camp Douglas, Illinois; duty there, at Camp Butler, Springfield, Illinois, and at Indianapolis, until March 1863. Left Indiana for Lexington, Kentucky, March 18. Duty in Central District of Kentucky until August. Operations against Pegram March 22-April 1. Action at Danville, Kentucky, March 24. Hickman's Heights March 28. Dutton's Hill, Monticello, May 1. Burnside's Campaign in eastern Tennessee August 16-September 17. Carter's Depot September 20–21. Jonesboro September 21. Knoxville Campaign November 4-December 23. Siege of Knoxville November 17-December 5. Garrison duty at Knoxville until March 1865. Stoneman's Raid through eastern Tennessee into North Carolina March and April 1865. Duty at Greenville, Tennessee, until July.

== Casualties ==
The battery lost a total of 13 men during service; 1 officer and 12 enlisted 6 men due to disease.

== Commanders ==
- Captain Silas F. Rigby
- Captain Hubbard T. Thomas

== See also ==
- List of Indiana Civil War regiments
- Indiana in the Civil War
