= Renwick's Elgin Battery Illinois Light Artillery =

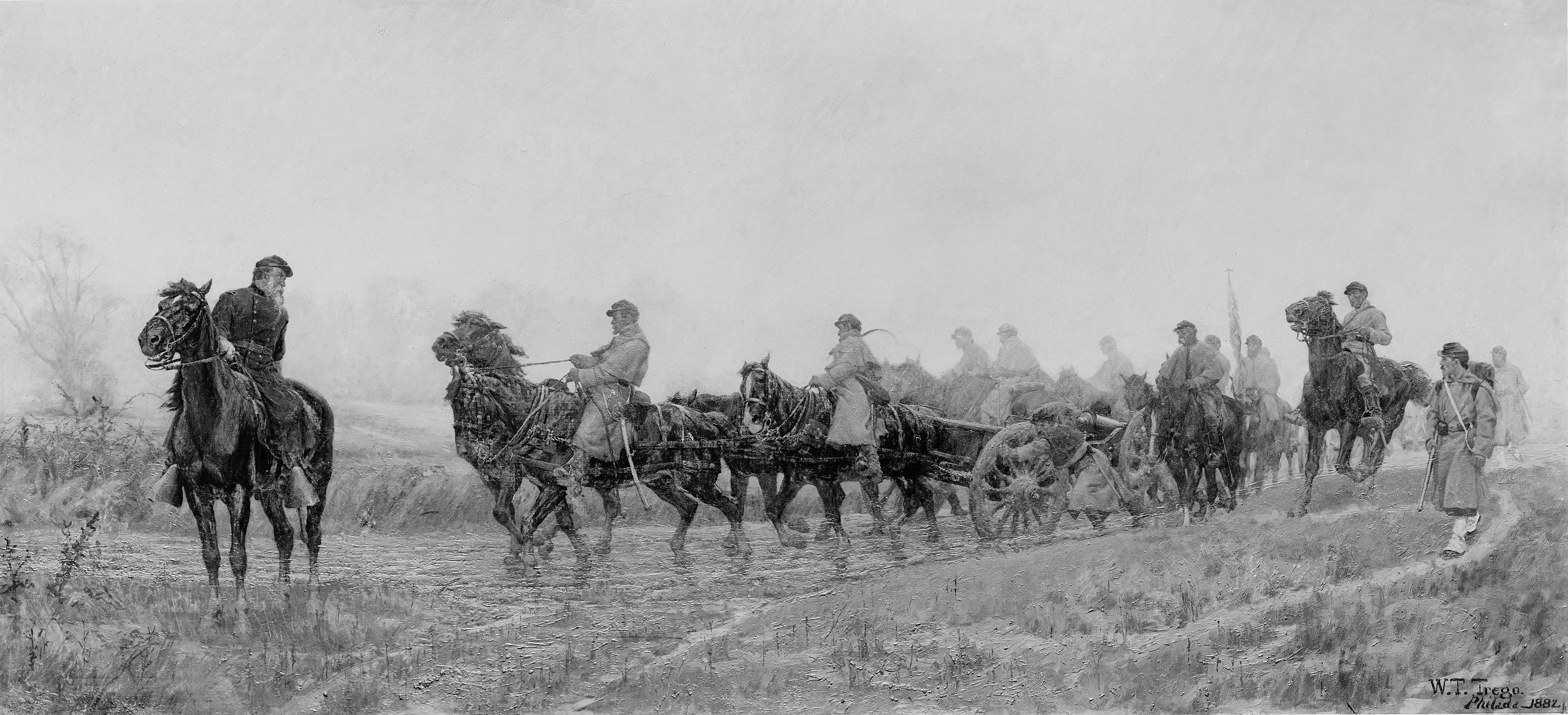
- Battery of Light Artillery En Route by William T. Trego (1883)
- Active: 15 Nov. 1862 – 18 July 1865
- Country: United States
- Allegiance: (United States) Union; Illinois
- Branch: Union Army
- Type: Field Artillery
- Size: Artillery Battery
- Engagements: American Civil War; Knoxville campaign (1863); Battle of Mossy Creek (1863); Battle of Wyse Fork (1865)

Commanders
- Notable commanders: George W. Renwick; Andrew M. Wood

Renwick's Elgin Battery Illinois Light Artillery was an artillery battery from Illinois that served in the Union Army during the American Civil War. The battery was mustered into service in November 1862 and assigned to guard duty in Kentucky. Starting in August 1863, the unit took part in Ambrose Burnside's campaign in east Tennessee and the Knoxville campaign. In February 1865, the battery was transferred to the Atlantic coast where it fought at Wyse Fork shortly before the war ended. The unit was mustered out of service in July 1865.

== Organization ==
Organized at Elgin, Ill., and mustered in November 15, 1862. Ordered to Kentucky and attached to District of Western Kentucky, Dept. of the Ohio, to April, 1863. 1st Brigade, 3rd Division, 23rd Army Corps, Dept. Ohio, to August, 1863. 1st Brigade, 2nd Division, 23rd Army Corps, to April, 1864. 2nd Brigade, 4th Division, 23rd Army Corps, to February, 1865. 2nd Brigade, 4th Division, District of East Tennessee, Dept. of the Cumberland, February, 1865. Artillery, 1st Division, 23rd Army Corps, Dept. of North Carolina, to July, 1865.

== Service ==
Duty at Bowling Green, Ky., until May, 1863, and at Glasgow and Tompkinsville until July. At Munfordsville July. Operations against Morgan in Kentucky July 2-26. Burnside's Campaign in East Tennessee August 16-October 17. At Loudon until November 9. Knoxville Campaign November 4-December 23. Moved to Kingston and duty there until December 4. Repulse of Wheeler's attack on Kingston November 24. Near Kingston December 4. March to Mossy Creek December 4-27. Action at Mossy Creek, Talbot's Station, December 29. At Mossy Creek until January, 1864. Post and garrison duty at Knoxville and other points in East Tennessee until February, 1865. Ordered to North Carolina. Campaign of the Carolinas March 1-April 26. Advance on Kinston and Goldsboro March 1-21. Battle of Wise's Forks, N. C., March 8-10. Occupation of Goldsborg March 21. Advance on Raleigh April 10-14. Occupation of Raleigh April 14. Bennett's House April 26. Surrender of Johnston and his army. Duty in Dept. of North Carolina until July. Mustered out July 18, 1865.

Battery lost during service 13 by disease.

== See also ==
- List of Illinois Civil War units
