= 19th Ohio Independent Light Artillery Battery =

19th Ohio Battery
- Active: September 10, 1862 to June 28, 1865
- Country: United States
- Allegiance: Union
- Branch: Artillery
- Engagements: Knoxville Campaign; Atlanta campaign Battle of Resaca; Battle of Dallas; Battle of New Hope Church; Battle of Allatoona; Battle of Kennesaw Mountain; Siege of Atlanta; Battle of Jonesboro; Battle of Lovejoy's Station; Battle of Franklin; Battle of Nashville; Carolinas campaign

19th Ohio Battery was an artillery battery that served in the Union Army during the American Civil War.

== Service ==
The 19th Ohio Battery was organized in Cleveland, Ohio and mustered in September 10, 1862, for a three-year enlistment under Captain Joseph C. Shields.

The battery was attached to Army of Kentucky, Department of the Ohio, to December 1862. Artillery, 2nd Division, Army of Kentucky, Department of the Ohio, to January 1863. District of Central Kentucky, Department of the Ohio, to June 1863. 2nd Brigade, 4th Division, XXIII Corps, Army of the Ohio, to July 1863. 2nd Brigade, 1st Division, XXIII Corps, to August 1863. Reserve Artillery, XXIII Corps, to January 1864. 1st Brigade. 3rd Division, XXIII Corps, to April 1864. Artillery, 2nd Division, XXIII Corps, to February 1865. Artillery, 2nd Division, XXIII Corps, Department of North Carolina, to June 1865.

The 19th Ohio Battery mustered out of service at Salisbury, North Carolina, on June 28, 1865.

== Detailed service ==
Moved to Covington, Ky., October 6; then marched to Lexington, Ky., October 23–28. Camp at Ashland, Lexington, Ky., until December 1862. Moved to Richmond, Ky., December 10; then to Danville, Ky., December 31, and to Frankfort January 5, 1863. Return to Lexington, Ky., February 22, and duty there until June 6. March to Somerset June 6–10. Pursuit of Morgan from Somerset, Ky., to Steubenville, Ohio, July 5–29. Burnside's Campaign in eastern Tennessee August 16-October 17. Expedition to Cumberland Gap September 3–7. Operations about Cumberland Gap September 7–10. Duty at Knoxville, Tenn., until December. Knoxville Campaign November 4 to December 23. Campbell's Station November 16. Siege of Knoxville November 17-December 5. Camp at College Hill until March 1864. Moved to Morristown March 15, then to Mossy Creek. Moved to Knoxville April 20, then march to Cleveland, Tenn., April 27-May 3. Atlanta Campaign May to September. Demonstrations on Dalton May 9–13. Rocky Faced Ridge May 9–11. Battle of Resaca May 14–15. Advance on Dallas May 18–25. Operations on line of Pumpkin Vine Creek and battles about Dallas, New Hope Church, and Allatoona Hills May 25-June 5. Operations about Marietta and against Kennesaw Mountain June 10-July 2. Pine Hill June 11–14. Lost Mountain June 15–17. Muddy Creek June 17. Noyes Creek June 19. Kolb's Farm June 22. Assault on Kennesaw June 27. Nickajack Creek July 2–5. Chattahoochie River July 5–17. Capture of Decatur July 19. Howard House July 20. Siege of Atlanta July 22-August 25. Utoy Creek August 5–7. Flank movement on Jonesboro August 25–30. Battle of Jonesboro August 31-September 1. Lovejoy's Station September 2–6. Duty at Decatur until October, and at Atlanta until November 1. Moved to Nashville, Tenn., November 1. Nashville Campaign November–December. In front of Columbia, Tenn., November 24–27. Battle of Franklin November 30. Battle of Nashville December 15–16. Pursuit of Hood to the Tennessee River December 17–28. At Clifton, Tenn., until January 15, 1865. Movement to North Carolina via Washington, D.C., January 15–22. Occupation of Wilmington February 22; duty there until March 6. Advance on Goldsboro March 6–21. Occupation of Goldsboro March 21. Advance on Raleigh April 10–13. Occupation of Raleigh April 14. Bennett's House April 26. Surrender of Johnston and his army. Duty at Raleigh and Salisbury, N.C., until June.

== Casualties ==
The battery lost a total of 9 enlisted men during service; 2 killed and 7 died due to disease.

== Commanders ==
- Captain Joseph C. Shields
- Captain Frank Wilson, Sr.

== See also ==
- List of Ohio Civil War units
- Ohio in the Civil War
