= Battle of Philadelphia =

Battle of the American Civil War

Battle of Philadelphia, Tenn.
- Part of the Knoxville campaign during the American Civil War
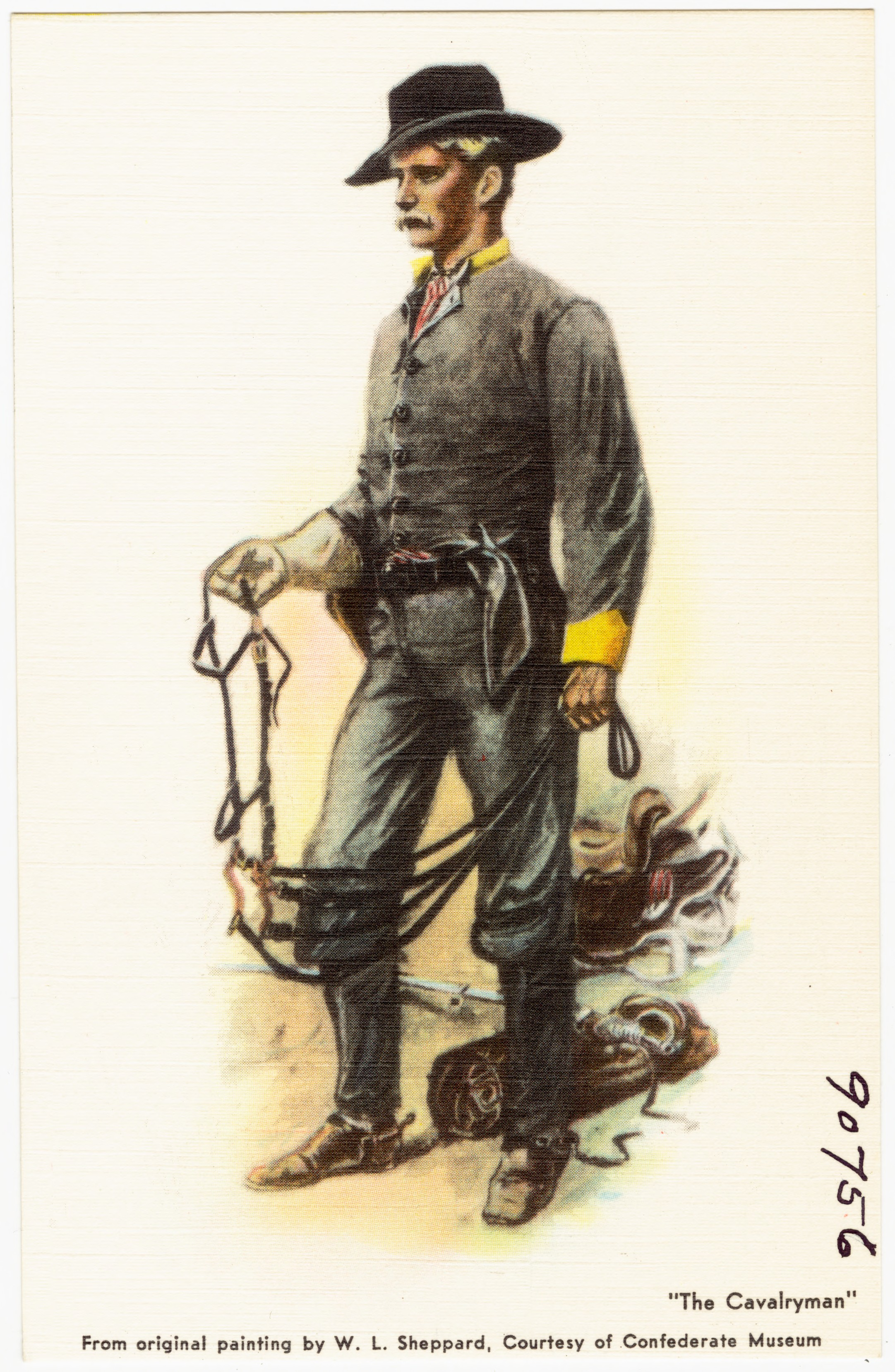
- Confederate cavalryman, painting by W. L. Sheppard
Date	October 20, 1863
Location	Philadelphia, Tennessee 35°40′42″N 84°24′5″W
Result	Confederate victory

Belligerents
(Confederate States of America) CSA (Confederacy)	United States (Union)

Commanders and leaders
(Confederate States of America) George G. Dibrell (Confederate States of America) J. J. Morrison	(United States) Frank Wolford

Strength
2 cavalry brigades attached artillery	1 cavalry brigade, 6 guns

Casualties and losses
167	479, 6 guns

The Battle of Philadelphia (October 20, 1863) saw the Confederate cavalry brigades of Colonels J. J. Morrison and George Gibbs Dibrell attack a Union cavalry brigade under Colonel Frank Wolford at Philadelphia, Tennessee, during the Knoxville campaign of the American Civil War. While Dibrell's brigade skirmished with Wolford's cavalrymen, Morrison led his brigade around the west side of Philadelphia to attack the Union force from the rear. Wolford sent half his brigade to counter Morrison's envelopment, but Dibrell's soldiers suddenly attacked. The Confederates completely routed Wolford's troopers, capturing over 400. A Union infantry-cavalry force reoccupied Philadelphia the next day, but a week later it withdrew to the north bank of the Tennessee River, abandoning Loudon, Tennessee.

== Background ==
On March 25, 1863, Major General Ambrose Burnside took command of the Army of the Ohio with the understanding that his assignment was to seize East Tennessee. Burnside's operation was to be made in coordination with a campaign by Major General William Rosecrans and the Army of the Cumberland against Chattanooga, Tennessee. A two-month delay occurred when Burnside's IX Corps was sent to assist in the Siege of Vicksburg. On August 24, 1863, Burnside launched the invasion of East Tennessee, using XXIII Corps troops moving in several columns. Burnside's infantry entered East Tennessee by way of Kingston while a Union cavalry brigade entered Knoxville unopposed on September 1. When Burnside directed his march northeast from Kingston toward Knoxville, he dropped off Brigadier General Julius White's infantry division to hold Loudon.

The nearly bloodless conquest occurred because Brigadier General Simon Bolivar Buckner, the Confederate commander of East Tennessee, evacuated Knoxville on August 22. Following orders, Buckner took 8,000 troops to join the Army of Tennessee, burning the railroad bridge at Loudon and leaving only small garrisons in East Tennessee. On September 9, Brigadier General John W. Frazer surrendered 2,000 Confederates in the Battle of Cumberland Gap after being caught between Union soldiers under Colonel John F. De Courcy on the north side and Burnside's troops on the south side of Cumberland Gap. Soon afterward, the Union army set up a telegraph line connecting Knoxville with Kentucky. Union general-in-chief Major General Henry Halleck urged Burnside to march his forces to join the Army of the Cumberland at Chattanooga, but this could not be done right away. On September 24, the IX Corps troops finally joined Burnside at Knoxville with 6,000 soldiers in two divisions.

The strategic situation abruptly changed after the Confederate victory in the Battle of Chickamauga on September 19–20, 1863. The Confederate commander Braxton Bragg failed to fully exploit his costly victory, but nevertheless drove the Army of the Cumberland into Chattanooga where it was besieged. The Federal response was rapid. The XI Corps and XII Corps were ordered to transfer from the Eastern Theater to the Western Theater, and go to the relief of Chattanooga. Therefore, Burnside was no longer required to go to Chattanooga. Burnside received another reinforcement when Brigadier General Orlando B. Willcox arrived at Cumberland Gap with 3,000 Indiana soldiers on October 3. Meanwhile, Major General Samuel Jones with 6,000 Confederates hovered to the northeast. Burnside dealt with this threat by beating Brigadier General John Stuart Williams' Confederate force at the Battle of Blue Springs on October 10, and driving it beyond the Watauga River. Burnside returned to Knoxville on October 14 after assigning Willcox the task of protecting his northeastern flank.

== Battle ==
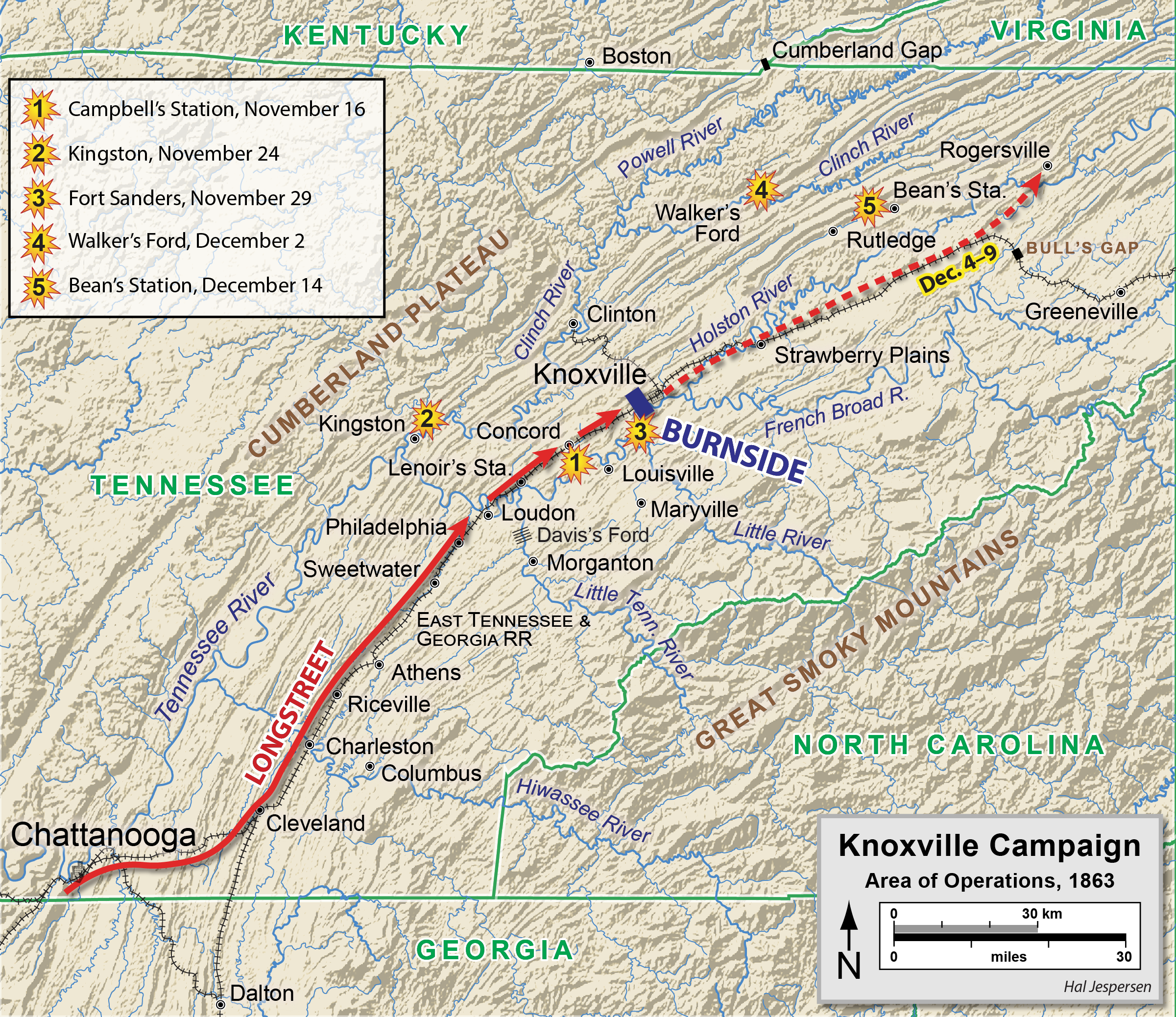
Philadelphia is left of center, on the East Tennessee and Georgia Railroad between Loudon and Sweetwater.

After Williams' defeat, Jones asked the Confederate government for assistance, and it forwarded the request to Bragg at Chattanooga. Bragg sent an infantry division led by Major General Carter L. Stevenson and two cavalry brigades under Morrison and Dibrell to menace the Union-occupied region in East Tennessee. Stevenson left Bragg's army on October 17, but there was such a shortage of equipment on the East Tennessee and Georgia Railroad that his infantry only reached Charleston on October 19. On that date, Stevenson sent the cavalry brigades to attack Philadelphia, 6 mi (9.7 km) south of Loudon. At Sweetwater, 6 mi (9.7 km) south of Philadelphia was a Confederate infantry brigade under Brigadier General John C. Vaughn that had been captured at Vicksburg. The brigade had been paroled and exchanged, but it was not ready to take the field. The troops did not participate in the battle, but Vaughn took an active part in planning the operation.

Stevenson ordered Dibrell's brigade to advance directly on Philadelphia and attack the Federals at dawn on October 20. Morrison's brigade was reinforced by Colonel McKenzie's (5th Tennessee Cavalry from Dibrell's brigade) and Major Jessee's (Kentucky cavalry battalion from Colonel C. H. Tyler's brigade) commands. Morrison was directed to get in the rear of the Union force at Philadelphia and cooperate with Dibrell. Morrison and Dibrell agreed between themselves that Dibrell's brigade, reinforced by a detachment from John T. Morgan's brigade, would reach Philadelphia at noon. Morrison later notified Dibrell that his troops would not be in position until 2 pm. Meanwhile, Dibrell used two of his regiments and a section of artillery to skirmish with the Union cavalry, while the remainder of his troops were kept out of sight. Dibrell engaged in an artillery duel with Wolford's Union guns for over an hour. When Morrison's cannons began booming in the Federal rear, Dibrell immediately launched an assault that routed the Union troops and captured many prisoners. Dibrell reported losing only 1 killed and 3 captured.

Morrison reported that his 1,800 cavalrymen crossed the Hiwassee River at Kincannon's Ferry (west of Charleston) by 10 pm on October 19. While passing to the west of Philadelphia, Morrison's brigade captured some wagons and 40 Union soldiers. When he reached a point north of Philadelphia, Morrison cut the telegraph line and sent one regiment to demonstrate against White's infantry at Loudon to keep it from interfering. Morrison then moved toward Philadelphia and was confronted by what he believed was the entire Union force. Twice Morrison's cavalry attacked and were driven back in "one of the hardest cavalry fights of the war", before routing the Federals. Morrison reported losing 14 killed and 82 wounded.

Wolford detected Morrison's envelopment and sent Colonel Silas Adams with the 1st Kentucky and 11th Kentucky Cavalry Regiments to block the move, but they were "cut off". Adams returned to Loudon with 50 prisoners. With his remaining 700 cavalry, Wolford opposed Dibrell's brigade coming from the south. With Confederates attacking from all sides and his guns out of ammunition, Wolford gathered up his command and broke out, leaving 6 mountain howitzers behind but bringing a few prisoners with him. Federal losses were 7 killed, 25 wounded, and 447 captured. The Confederates lost 15 killed, 82 wounded, and 70 captured. Aside from the 6 guns, the Confederates captured 50 wagons loaded with stores, 10 ambulances, 75 beef cattle, and an unspecified number of mules and horses.

== Aftermath ==
On October 21, White's infantry and the rallied survivors of Wolford's brigade advanced and recaptured Philadelphia. Morrison and Dibrell fell back to a position 2.5 mi (4.0 km) northeast of Sweetwater. When they found that White's troops abandoned Philadelphia on the night of October 21, the Confederates reoccupied Philadelphia the following day and took position to the northeast of the town. Meanwhile, Stevenson's infantry arrived at Sweetwater on October 22. Burnside reached Loudon on October 23. The setback at Philadelphia and reports that more Confederate infantry were expected caused Burnside to withdraw to the north bank of the Tennessee River. On October 28, the Federals evacuated Loudon, allowing Unionist civilians to leave the town. Burnside planned to hold Kingston and the line of the Little Tennessee River to block any Confederate incursion from the south. Burnside brought the two IX Corps divisions (6,000 men) to hold the area north of Loudon, together with White's 3,000 troops. Meanwhile, Milo Smith Hascall's XXIII Corps division held Knoxville, Willcox's soldiers defended Bull's Gap, and two regiments and 300 cavalry held Cumberland Gap.

== Forces ==
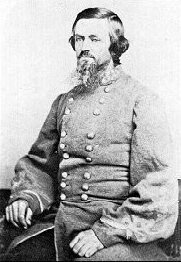
George G. Dibrell

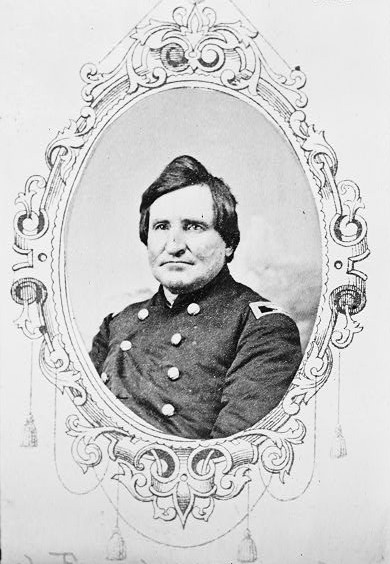
Frank Wolford

Confederate order of battle for the Battle of Philadelphia, Tenn.
Division	Brigade	Unit
Martin's Division; Major General; William T. Martin	1st Brigade; Brigadier General; John Tyler Morgan	"Detachment" (Note: Attached to Dibrell's brigade. (Official Records, p. 12))
Martin's Division; Major General; William T. Martin	2nd Brigade; Colonel; J. J. Morrison	1st Georgia Cavalry Regiment
Martin's Division; Major General; William T. Martin	2nd Brigade; Colonel; J. J. Morrison	2nd Georgia Cavalry Regiment
Martin's Division; Major General; William T. Martin	2nd Brigade; Colonel; J. J. Morrison	3rd Georgia Cavalry Regiment
Martin's Division; Major General; William T. Martin	2nd Brigade; Colonel; J. J. Morrison	4th Georgia Cavalry Regiment
Martin's Division; Major General; William T. Martin	2nd Brigade; Colonel; J. J. Morrison	6th Georgia Cavalry Regiment
Armstrong's Division; Brigadier General; Frank Crawford Armstrong	1st Brigade; Colonel; George Gibbs Dibrell	4th Tennessee Cavalry Regiment (Baxter Smith's)
Armstrong's Division; Brigadier General; Frank Crawford Armstrong	1st Brigade; Colonel; George Gibbs Dibrell	5th Tennessee Cavalry Regiment (McKenzie's) (Note: Attached to Morrison's brigade. (Official Records, p. 8))
Armstrong's Division; Brigadier General; Frank Crawford Armstrong	1st Brigade; Colonel; George Gibbs Dibrell	8th Tennessee Cavalry Regiment (Dibrell's)
Armstrong's Division; Brigadier General; Frank Crawford Armstrong	1st Brigade; Colonel; George Gibbs Dibrell	9th Tennessee Cavalry Regiment
Armstrong's Division; Brigadier General; Frank Crawford Armstrong	1st Brigade; Colonel; George Gibbs Dibrell	10th Tennessee Cavalry Regiment
Armstrong's Division; Brigadier General; Frank Crawford Armstrong	2nd Brigade; Colonel C. H. Tyler	Jessee's Kentucky Cavalry Battalion (Note: Attached to Morrison's brigade. (Official Records, p. 8))

Union order of battle and casualties for the Battle of Philadelphia, Tenn.
Unit	Killed	Wounded	Missing
1st Kentucky Cavalry Regiment	0	0	127
11th Kentucky Cavalry Regiment	1	3	89
12th Kentucky Cavalry Regiment	2	13	97
45th Ohio Infantry Regiment (mounted)	4	9	134

== Notes ==
Footnotes

Citations
