= Sanders' Knoxville Raid =

Battle of the American Civil War

- Part of the American Civil War
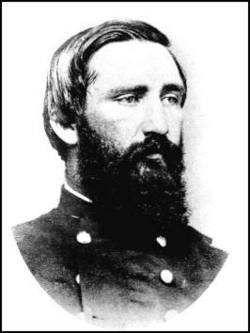
- William P. Sanders
Date	June 14–24, 1863
Location	Knoxville, Tennessee 35.9617°N 83.9232°W
Result	Union victory

Belligerents
United States (Union)	(Confederate States of America) CSA (Confederacy)

Commanders and leaders
William P. Sanders	Simon Bolivar Buckner

Strength
1,500, 2 guns	Various

Casualties and losses
19 casualties, 2 guns	461 paroled prisoners

Sanders' Knoxville Raid (June 14–24, 1863) saw 1,500 Union cavalry and mounted infantry led by Colonel William P. Sanders raid East Tennessee before the Knoxville campaign during the American Civil War. The successful raid began at Mount Vernon, Kentucky and moved south, passing near Kingston, Tennessee. Moving east from the Kingston area, the raiders struck the East Tennessee and Georgia Railroad at Lenoir Station. The Union horsemen rode northeast along the railroad, destroying track, bridges, and property useful to the Confederate States of America. Blocked from seizing Knoxville by its 1,000 Confederate defenders, Sanders' horsemen destroyed a major bridge across the Holston River at Strawberry Plains on the East Tennessee and Virginia Railroad. After wrecking a smaller bridge at Mossy Creek, the raiders turned northwest, evading pursuers by slipping through an obscure gap in the Cumberland Plateau. Sanders' men reached Boston, Kentucky on June 24, having captured and paroled over 400 Confederate soldiers while sustaining minimal losses in men but considerable losses in horses.

== Background ==
Since the start of the Civil War, President Abraham Lincoln and other government authorities urged Union generals to invade East Tennessee. There were two reasons for this. First, a large part of the East Tennessee population remained loyal to the government in Washington, D.C. and seethed under Confederate occupation. Second, a key railroad through the region connected Virginia with the western Confederate states. The East Tennessee and Georgia Railroad linked Knoxville with Chattanooga, Tennessee and Dalton, Georgia, while the East Tennessee and Virginia Railroad connected Knoxville with Bristol, Virginia. Logistics was the major obstacle keeping Union forces from seizing East Tennessee. There were no railroads linking the region with Union-occupied areas of Kentucky, and the wagon roads across the Cumberland Plateau became very difficult to use in bad weather. Supplying an invading army with necessities by wagon promised to be challenging. Lincoln hoped to build a railroad, but its construction was not attempted because it would have taken too long. Therefore, Union commanders directed their efforts to capturing Middle Tennessee in 1862.

On April 27, 1863, the Union XXIII Corps was formed from the regiments stationed in Kentucky and put under the command of Major General George Lucas Hartsuff. The Army of the Ohio, led by Major General Ambrose Burnside consisted of the XXIII Corps plus the IX Corps from the Eastern Theater. Burnside was tasked with the invasion of East Tennessee at the same time that the Army of the Cumberland was ordered to capture Chattanooga. On June 2, Burnside left his Cincinnati headquarters to lead the expedition. However, the following day he was ordered to send 8,000 troops to assist in the Siege of Vicksburg. Burnside sent the veteran IX Corps under Major General John Parke and this caused the planned invasion to be delayed until August 16.

While waiting for the return of IX Corps, Burnside ordered a cavalry raid to destroy important railroad bridges east and west of Knoxville. This operation was recommended in May 1863 by IX Corps Brigadier General Orlando B. Willcox, who also advised appointing Sanders as its commander. In December 1862, a successful cavalry raid led by Brigadier General Samuel P. Carter inflicted damage on the railroad. Sanders was born in Kentucky, raised in Mississippi, graduated from West Point Academy in 1856, and served on the western frontier. Despite his Southern upbringing, Sanders remained loyal to the Union, fighting at the battles of Williamsburg and Antietam before being appointed colonel of the 5th Kentucky Cavalry Regiment on March 4, 1863.

== Raid ==
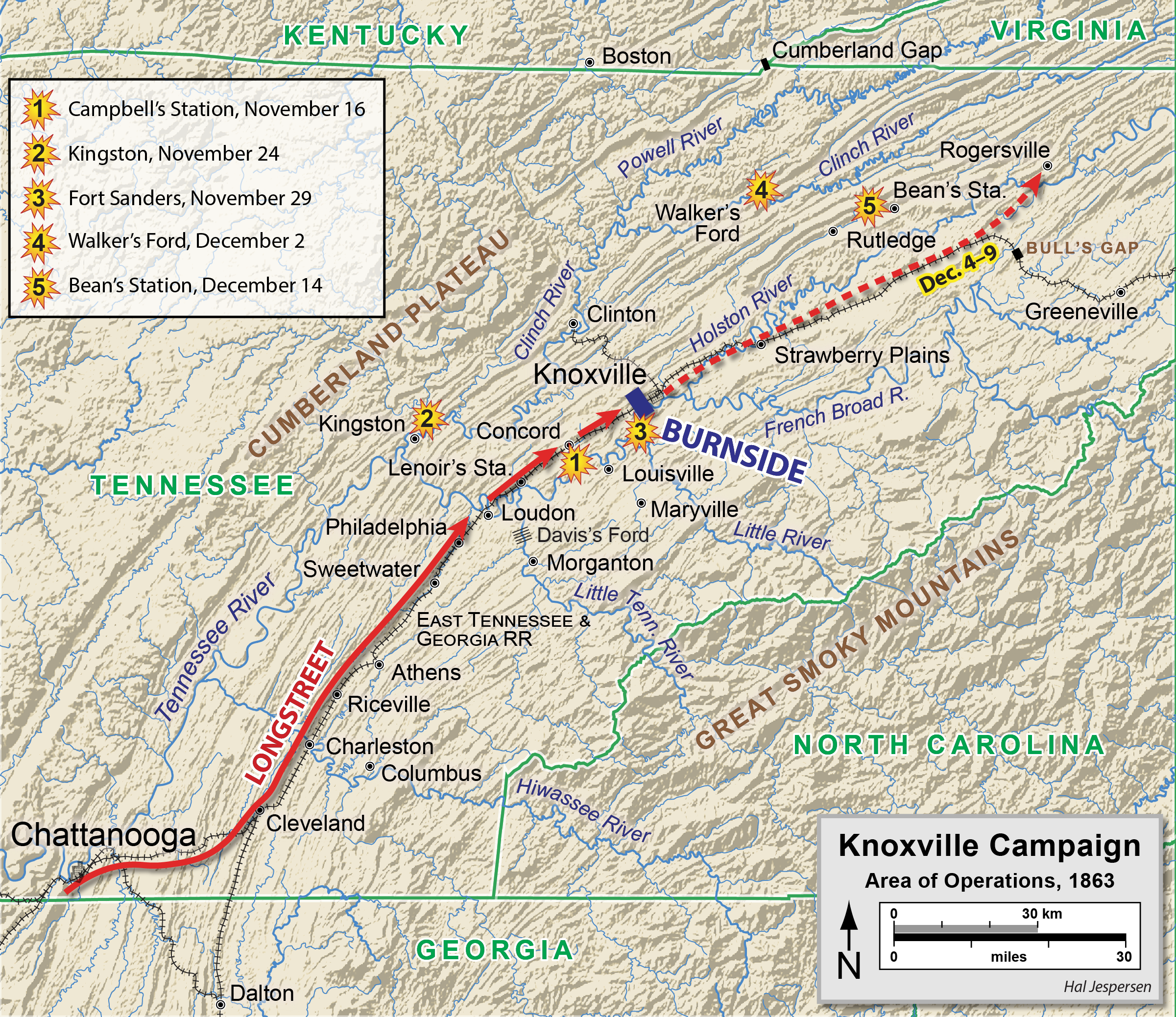
From Williamsburg, which is at the top edge of the map above Boston, Sanders' raiders moved southwest, then south to Kingston. They struck the railroad at Lenoir's and followed it past Strawberry Plains to Mossy Creek (above the "b" in Strawberry). From there, they returned directly to Boston.

On June 14, 1863, Sanders left Mount Vernon, Kentucky with 1,500 Union mounted soldiers from the following units.

Union order of battle and casualties for Sanders' Raid
Unit	Strength	Commander	Killed	Wounded	Missing
1st Tennessee Infantry Regiment (mounted)	700	Colonel Robert K. Byrd	0	1	2
44th Ohio Infantry Regiment (mounted)	200	Major Alpheus S. Moore	0	0	2
112th Illinois Infantry Regiment (mounted)	200	Major Tristam T. Dow	1	0	5
2nd Ohio Cavalry Regiment	150	Captain David E. Welch	0	3 (Note: One of the 2nd Ohio's wounded later died. (Official Records p. 389))	5
7th Ohio Cavalry Regiment	150	Captain Richard C. Rankin	0	0	6
1st Kentucky Cavalry Regiment	100	Captain George Drye	1	0	1
Battery D, 1st Ohio Light Artillery (Konkle's)	2 guns	Lieutenant Henry C. Lloyd	0	0	0
Totals	1,500, 2 guns	–	2	4	21 (Note: A later report stated that 7 of the missing men had showed up. This means that in the final report of 13 missing, 1 missing man is not accounted for. (Official Records p. 389))

Sanders' column took a wagon train containing forage and provisions with his column from Mount Vernon to Williamsburg, Kentucky, on the Cumberland River, a distance of 60 mi (97 km). At Williamsburg, Sanders sent the wagon train back with an escort of 200 horsemen. Meanwhile, another column of Federals rode south of Williamsburg toward Big Creek Gap as a diversion. This feint worked so well that the Confederate department commander Brigadier General Simon Bolivar Buckner massed the bulk of his troops at Clinton, 15 mi (24 km) northwest of Knoxville. Sanders' column passed west of Huntsville, Tennessee, and arrived at the village of Montgomery (now-defunct) on the evening of June 17. Discovering that some Confederate cavalry were nearby at Wartburg, Sanders sent 400 men from the 1st Tennessee to attack them. Sanders' men surprised, captured, and paroled 2 officers and 102 men, and seized their horses. The Union raiders also captured and destroyed six wagons filled with food, artillery ammunition, and tools. As they approached Kingston, the Union horsemen discovered that Colonel John S. Scott's Confederate cavalry brigade was in the town, so Sanders crossed the Clinch River 8 mi (13 km) to the northeast to avoid it.

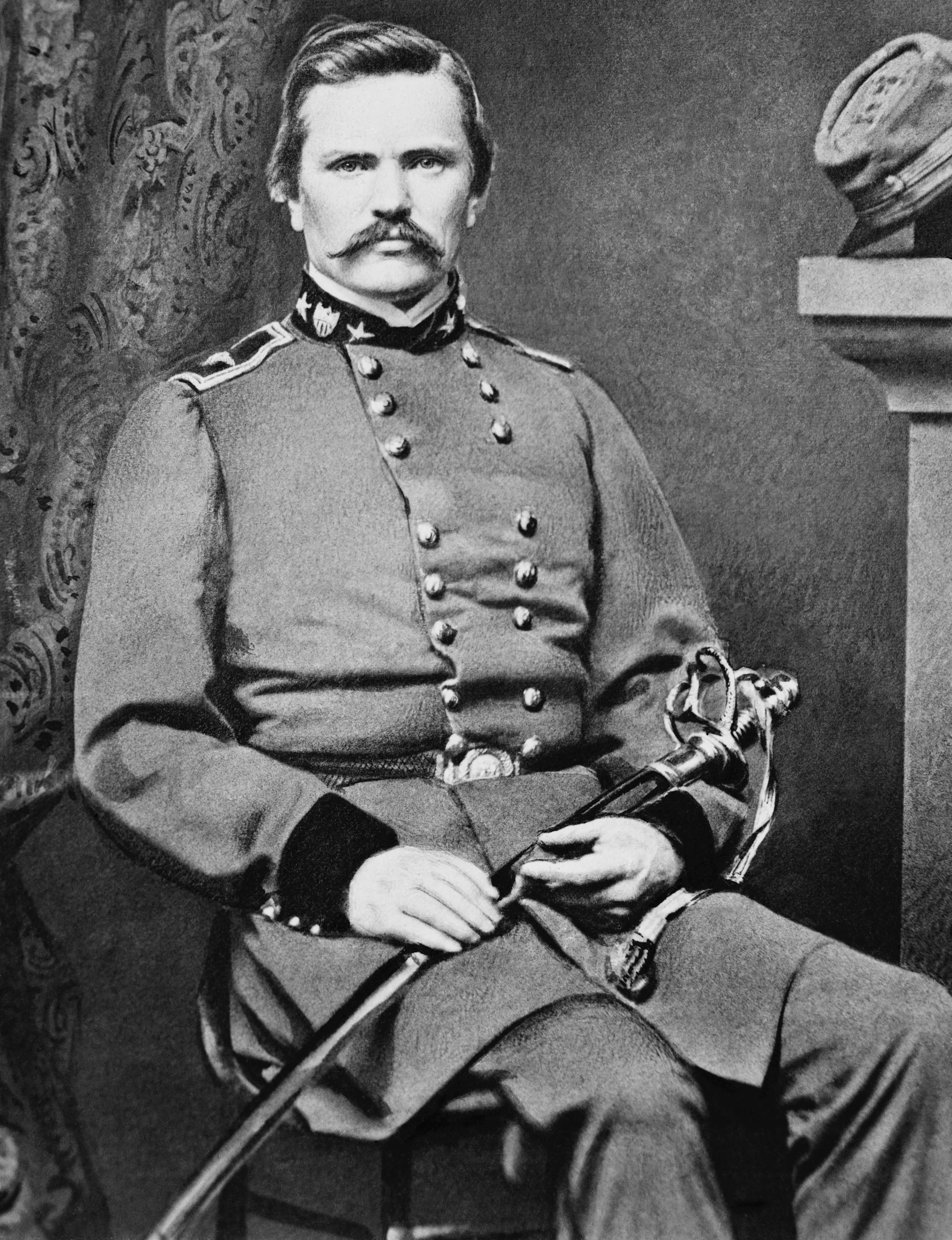
Simon B. Buckner

Sanders hoped to destroy the major bridge that carried the East Tennessee and Georgia Railroad over the Tennessee River at Loudon, about 25 mi (40 km) southwest of Knoxville. This bridge was found to be guarded by a force too strong to be overwhelmed, so Sanders headed for Lenoir's Station instead. On June 19 at 8 am, the Union cavalry descended on Lenoir's, capturing 65 Confederates and three iron 6-pounder field guns. Sanders' raiders cut the telegraph line, burned the depot, seized 75 horses and mules, and destroyed 2,500 weapons, 5 pieces of artillery, ammunition, and military equipment. The Union horsemen moved along the railroad, cutting the telegraph line and tearing up track at intervals of about 1 mi (1.6 km). That evening, when 8 mi (13 km) west of Knoxville, Union skirmishers encountered some Confederate pickets and Dr. James Harvey Baker, who was armed with a rifle and pistol and intending to join in the defense of the city. Believing Baker was a Confederate soldier, they chased him into his house, fatally wounding him, but not before he wounded one of the Union cavalrymen.

Buckner left 1,000 Confederates to defend Knoxville and these were joined by 200 armed citizens and soldiers not fit for active duty. Colonel Robert C. Trigg commanded the 6th Florida, 7th Florida, and 54th Virginia Infantry Regiments. Trigg placed six 6-pounder field guns on McGee's, Summit, and Temperance Hills outside the city and supported them with his infantry units. At 7 pm on June 19, Sanders left the 1st Kentucky to watch the west side of Knoxville while he circled around the city with the rest of his raiders to approach it from the north. He tore up the railroad so that reinforcements could not be sent to the bridges above the city. Early on June 20, the Union raiders skirmished with Knoxville's defenders for about one hour. Sanders withdrew after losing 1 killed and 2 wounded and inflicting a loss of 4 killed and 4 wounded on the defenders. The raiders also captured two 6-pounders, 31 men, and 80 horses. The Union column continued moving east along the railroad, destroying a bridge at Flat Creek about 4 mi (6.4 km) southwest of Strawberry Plains.

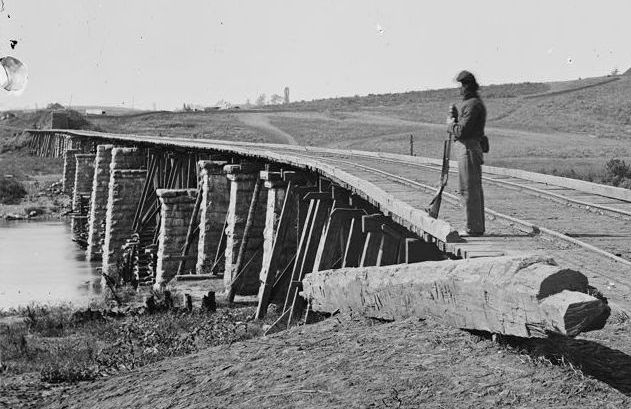
Union sentry guards the repaired bridge across the Holston River at Strawberry Plains in 1864. (Note: Burnside's Union forces captured Knoxville on September 1, 1863. (Hess, p. 14))

Sanders' raiders crossed the Holston River and attacked the Confederate bridge guard at Strawberry Plains, which numbered 400 men. Sanders sent Moore and the 44th Ohio to make a dismounted attack, while other troops under Byrd and Dow attempted to cut off the bridge guard's retreat. After one hour, most of the Confederates fled aboard a locomotive and train, while 2 officers and 137 men surrendered. Sanders' men wrecked 5 cannons, 70 tents, a large quantity of salt and food, and other supplies. The Union cavalrymen spent the night destroying the bridge, which was supported by 11 piers. Starting at dawn on June 21, the raiders moved east to Mossy Creek near Jefferson City. After capturing its 120-man bridge guard, Sanders' men destroyed the Mossy Creek bridge and ruined more supplies, including 200 barrels of sugar. They also wrecked nearby saltpeter and gun factories. Aware that his column was the target of Confederate forces, Sanders left the railroad and made a dash for Rogers' Gap in Cumberland Mountain.

Sanders' column forded the Holston River at Hayworth's Bend and headed for Powder Springs Gap in Clinch Mountain. The Union raiders soon found a Confederate force in front with a second pursuing force coming up behind. The column used country roads to evade the force in front and passed through the gap without resistance. When approaching Rogers' Gap (near Speedwell), the Union column discovered the road obstructed with felled trees and defended by infantry and artillery. Unable to use the road, Sanders destroyed his two artillery pieces plus three captured guns, ammunition, artillery wagons, and harness. Blocked by Confederate pursuers in front and rear, Sanders' men moved 3 mi (4.8 km) west and crossed Cumberland Mountain by Smith's Gap, as reported by Sanders, or by Childer's Gap, according to Hess. Sanders' escape was facilitated by some East Tennessee soldiers in his command who knew all the byways. The skirmishes in the area occurred on June 22. Sanders described Smith's Gap as a mere bridal path and noted that part of his force became separated near there. Dow and the missing 170 men eventually escaped and rejoined the column in Kentucky. Sanders' main column arrived at Boston, (present-day Lot, Kentucky), on June 24.

== Results ==
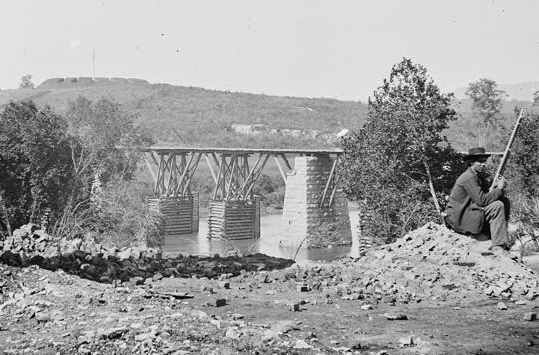
Photo shows a Union sentry and the Strawberry Plains bridge in 1864.

The Union raiders sustained casualties of 2 killed, 4 wounded, and 13 missing. Sanders reported that his soldiers captured several hundred horses during the raid. So many horses broke down and were left behind that not every raider had a horse at the end of the operation. Sanders reported paroling 461 Confederate prisoners. Burnside congratulated Sanders for the "brilliant success of your expedition". The destroyed spans were the 1,600 ft (488 m) Strawberry Plains bridge, the 312 ft (95 m) Slate Creek bridge, and the 325 ft (99 m) Mossy Creek bridge. (Note: Sanders reported wrecking the Slate Creek bridge in one report and the Flat Creek bridge in a second report. These might have been the same structure.) Buckner reported that the repair crews would have the railroad back in operation within four days. He admitted that the largest bridge would not be repaired for two weeks, but that he would make a river steamer available to transfer freight across the Holston. Confederate States Secretary of War James Seddon wondered if Buckner's repair estimates were too optimistic. Burnside's sources informed him that the Strawberry Plains bridge would take two months to rebuild. Sanders was promoted brigadier general on October 18, 1863, and mortally wounded in action on November 18, 1863, at Knoxville.

== Locations of interest ==
- Childress Gap
- Haworth Bend
- Powder Spring Gap
- Rogers Gap

== Notes ==
Footnotes

Citations
