= 2nd Ohio Cavalry Regiment =

- Active: August 1861 to October 12, 1865
- Country: United States
- Allegiance: Union
- Branch: Cavalry
- Engagements: First Battle of Newtonia; Sanders' Knoxville Raid; Morgan's Raid; Battle of Buffington Island; Battle of Cumberland Gap; Knoxville Campaign; Battle of the Wilderness; Battle of Spotsylvania Court House; Battle of Totopotomoy Creek; Sheridan's Shenandoah Valley Campaign; Battle of Opequon; Battle of Fisher's Hill; Battle of Cedar Creek; Appomattox Campaign; Battle of Dinwiddie Court House; Battle of Five Forks; Battle of Namozine Church; Battle of Sailor's Creek; Battle of Appomattox Station; Battle of Appomattox Court House

The 2nd Ohio Cavalry Regiment was a cavalry regiment that served in the Union Army during the American Civil War.

== Service ==
The 2nd Ohio Cavalry Regiment was organized in Cleveland, Ohio and at Camp Dennison near Cincinnati, Ohio, from August to October 1861, and mustered in for a three years under the command of Colonel Charles Doubleday.

Men were detached from the regiment to form the 25th Ohio Battery at Fort Scott, Kansas, on August 27, 1862. The initial designation of the battery was 3rd Kansas Independent Battery (not be confused with the 3rd Independent Battery Kansas Light Artillery), but was officially changed to 25th Ohio Battery February 17, 1863. The battery was mustered in for three years service under the command of Captain Julius L. Hadley.

The regiment was attached to Doubleday's Brigade, Department of the Missouri, February to June 1862. Fort Scott, Kansas, to August 1862. Solomon's Brigade, Department of Kansas, to October 1862. 1st Brigade, 1st Division, Army of the Frontier, to December 1862. At Columbus, Ohio, to April 1863. Kautz's 1st Cavalry Brigade, District of Central Kentucky, Department of the Ohio, to June 1863. 3rd Brigade, 1st Division, XXIII Corps, Army of the Ohio, to August 1863. 3rd Brigade, 4th Division, XXIII Corps, to November 1863. 1st Brigade, 2nd Division Cavalry, XXIII Corps, to February 1864. At Columbus, Ohio, to April 1864. Cavalry, IX Corps, Army of the Potomac, to May 24, 1864. 1st Brigade, 3rd Division, Cavalry Corps, Army of the Potomac, and Middle Military Division, to May 1865. Department of the Missouri to October 1865.

The 2nd Ohio Cavalry mustered out of service October 12, 1865.

== Detailed service ==
- Duty at Camp Dennison, Ohio, November 1, 1861 - January 27, 1862.
- Scout duty on the Missouri border January 27 - February 18, 1862.
- Expedition to Fort Scott, Kan., February 18 - March 2, 1862.
- Action at Independence, Mo., February 22.
- Expedition to Diamond Grove, Kan., April 15 - May 7.
- Action at Horse Creek May 7.
- Expedition into Indian Territory May 25 - July 8.
- Action at Grand River June 6.
- Capture of Fort Gibson July 18. Bayou Bernard July 27. Montevallo August 5. Lone Jack, Mo., August 11.
- Blount's Campaign in Missouri and Arkansas September 17 - December 3. Expedition to Sarcoxie September 28–30. Newtonia September 30.
- Occupation of Newtonia October 4.
- Skirmishes at Carthage, Cow Hill, Cow Skin Prairie, Wolf Creek, Maysville, and White River.
- Ordered to Columbus, Ohio, December 1862, and duty there until March 1863.
- Moved to Somerset, Ky., and duty there until June 27. Mt. Sterling, Ky., March 19 (3rd battalion). Owensville March 31.
- Expedition to Monticello and operations in southeastern Kentucky April 26-May 12.
- Action at Monticello May 1. Near Mill Springs May 29. Monticello, Rocky Gap, and Steubenville June 9.
- Sanders' Raid in eastern Tennessee June 14–24 (3rd battalion). Knoxville June 19–20. Strawberry Plains and Rogers' Gap June 20. Powder Springs Gap June 21.
- Pursuit of Morgan July 1–25. Columbia, Ky., July 3. Buffington Island, Ohio, July 18–19.
- Operations in eastern Kentucky against Scott July 25-August 6. Near Rogersville July 27. Richmond July 28. Lancaster and Paint Lick Bridge July 31. Lancaster August 1. Burnside's Campaign in eastern Tennessee August 16-October 17. Winter's Gap August 31. Expedition to Cumberland Gap September 4–7.
- Operations about Cumberland Gap September 7–10. Capture of Cumberland Gap September 9. Greenville September 11. Carter's Depot September 22. Zollicoffer September 24. Jonesboro September 28. Greenville October 2. Blue Springs October 5 and 10. Sweetwater October 10–11. Knoxville Campaign November 4-December 23. Lenoir Station November 14–15. Stock Creek November 15.
- Siege of Knoxville November 17 - December 5. Morristown and Long's Ford December 10. Cheek's Cross Roads December 12. Russellville December 12–13. Bean's Station December 14. Blain's Cross Roads December 16–19. Rutledge December 16. Stone's Mill December 19. Dandridge December 24. Mossy Creek Station December 26.
- Regiment reenlisted January 1, 1864. On veteran furlough until March.
- Ordered to Annapolis, Md., March 20. Campaign from the Rapidan to the James May 4 - June 15. Battles of the Wilderness May 5–7; Piney Branch Ford May 8; Spottsylvania May 8–21; Piney Branch Ford May 15; U.S. Ford May 21 (detachment); North Anna River May 23–26.
- On line of the Pamunkey May 26–28. Totopotomoy May 28–31. Mechump's Creek and Hanover Court House May 31. Ashland June 1. Cold Harbor June 1–12. Gaines' Mill, Salem Church, Haw's Shop and Totopotomoy June 2. Haw's Shop June 3–5. Long Bridge and White House Landing June 12. Smith's Store, near Samaria Church, June 15. Wilson's Raid on Southside & Danville Railroad June 22–30. Black and White Station June 23. Staunton River Bridge, or Roanoke Station, June 25. Sappony Church, or Stony Creek, June 28–29. Ream's Station June 29. Sheridan's Shenandoah Valley Campaign August 7 - November 28. Winchester August 17. Summit Point August 21. Charlestown August 21–22. Smithfield and Kearneysville August 25. White Post September 3. Abram's Creek, near Winchester, September 13.
- Battle of Opequan, Winchester, September 19. Near Cedarville September 20. Front Royal Pike September 21. Milford and Fisher's Hill September 22. Waynesboro September 29. Bridgewater October 4. Near Columbia Furnace October 7. Tom's Brook October 8–9. Cedar Creek October 13.
- Battle of Cedar Creek October 19. New Market November 6. Kearneysville November 10. Newtown and Cedar Creek November 12. Rude's Hill, near Mt. Jackson, November 22.
- Raid to Lacey's Springs December 19–22. Lacey's Springs December 21.
- Expedition from Winchester to Moorefield, W. Va., February 4–6, 1865.
- Sheridan's Raid from Winchester to Petersburg February 27-March 25.
- Occupation of Staunton March 2. Waynesboro March 2.
- Occupation of Charlottesville March 3. Ashland March 15. Appomattox Campaign March 28-April 9.
- Dinwiddie Court House March 30–31. Five Forks April 1. Namozine Church April 3. Sayler's Creek April 6.
- Appomattox Station April 8. Appomattox Court House April 9.
- Surrender of Lee and his army.
- Expedition to Danville April 23–29.
- March to Washington, D.C., May. Grand Review of the Armies May 23.
- Ordered to St. Louis, Mo., May 27.
- Duty in Department of the Missouri until October.

== Casualties ==
The regiment lost a total of 267 men during service; 7 officers and 76 enlisted men killed or mortally wounded, 5 officers and 179 enlisted men died of disease.

== Commanders ==
- Colonel Charles Doubleday
- Colonel August V. Kautz
- Colonel Allnard Bayard Nettleton
- Colonel Dudley Seward

== Notable members ==
- Private Adelbert Bleekman, Company A - Wisconsin State Assemblyman and Senator
- First Sergeant Albert A. Clapp, Company G - Medal of Honor recipient for action at the battle of Sayler's Creek
- William L. Copeland, Company C
- Corporal Isaac Gause, Company E - Medal of Honor recipient for action near Berryville, Virginia, September 13, 1864
- Corporal Heinrich Hoffman, Company M - Medal of Honor recipient for action at the battle of Sayler's Creek
- Corporal John Hughey, Company L - Medal of Honor recipient for action at the battle of Sayler's Creek
- Corporal Smith Larimer, Company G - Medal of Honor recipient for action at the battle of Sayler's Creek
- Private William R. Richardson, Company A - Medal of Honor recipient for action at the battle of Sayler's Creek
- Lieutenant Colonel David E. Welch, Company I and C - Wisconsin State Assemblyman and Senator
- Major Lionel Allen Sheldon. Commander of 42nd Ohio Volunteer Infantry Regiment. Congressman of Louisiana 2nd district and New Mexico Territorial Governor. Ohio militia Brigadier General

== See also ==
- List of Ohio Civil War units
- Ohio in the Civil War
