= 112th Illinois Infantry Regiment =

112th Regiment Illinois Volunteer Infantry
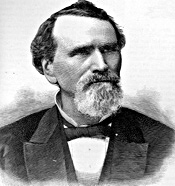
- Thomas J. Henderson led the 112th Illinois Infantry.
- Active: September 20, 1862 – July 7, 1865
- Country: United States
- Allegiance: (United States) Union; Illinois
- Branch: Union Army
- Type: Infantry and Mounted infantry
- Size: Regiment
- Engagements: American Civil War; Sanders' Knoxville Raid (1863); Knoxville campaign (1863); Atlanta campaign (1864); Battle of Resaca (1864); Battle of Dallas (1864); Battle of Gilgal Church (1864); Battle of Kennesaw Mountain (1864); Battle of Atlanta (1864); Battle of Utoy Creek (1864); Battle of Jonesborough (1864); Battle of Franklin (1864); Battle of Nashville (1864); Carolinas campaign (1865); Battle of Wilmington (1865)

Commanders
- Notable commanders: Thomas Jefferson Henderson

The 112th Illinois Volunteer Infantry was an infantry regiment in the Union Army during the American Civil War. It was organized at Peoria in September 1862 and garrisoned places in Kentucky until Spring 1863. Beginning in April 1863, the regiment served as mounted infantry during the Knoxville campaign, before being dismounted in February 1864. Subsequently, it served in the Atlanta campaign, the Franklin-Nashville campaign, and the Carolinas campaign as part of the XXIII Corps. The regiment was mustered out on June 20, 1865.

== Service ==
The 112th Illinois Infantry was organized at Peoria, Illinois, and mustered in for three years' service on September 20, 1862, under the command of Colonel Thomas Jefferson Henderson.

The regiment was attached to 1st Brigade, 2nd Division, Army of Kentucky, Department of the Ohio, to January 1863. 3rd Brigade, District of Central Kentucky, Department of the Ohio, to April 1863. 2nd Brigade, District of Central Kentucky, Department of the Ohio, to June 1863. 1st Brigade, 1st Division, XXIII Corps, Army of the Ohio, to August 1863. 1st Brigade, 4th Division, XXIII Corps, to October 1863. 2nd Brigade, 4th Division, XXIII Corps, to November 1863. 2nd Brigade, 1st Cavalry Division, XXIII Corps, to May 1864. 1st Brigade, 3rd Division, XXIII Corps, to August 1865. 3rd Brigade, 3rd Division, XXIII Corps, Army of the Ohio, to February 1865, and Department of North Carolina to June 1865.

The 112th Illinois Infantry mustered out of service at Greensboro, North Carolina June 20, 1865, and was discharged at Chicago on July 7, 1865.

== Detailed service ==
Moved to Covington, Kentucky, October 8, 1862. Moved to Falmouth, Kentucky, October 18, 1862. Escorted supply train to Big Eagle, Kentucky, October 19–21, then moved to Georgetown and Lexington, Kentucky. October 23–24. Duty at Lexington until March 1863. Moved to Danville, Kentucky, March 21; then to Nicholasville, Camp Dick Robinson, Lancaster, Crab Orchard, Stanford, and Milledgeville, Kentucky. Duty at Milledgeville until April 26. Regiment mounted at Milledgeville. Moved to Somerset April 26. Operations against Pegram's forces in southeastern Kentucky April 26-May 12. Action at Monticello May 1. Duty at Somerset, Kentucky, until July. Saunders' Raid in eastern Tennessee June 14–24 (detachment). Knoxville June 19–20. Strawberry Plains June 20. Rogers' Gap June 20. Powder Springs Gap June 21. Pursuit of Scott's forces July 9–13. Operations in eastern Kentucky against Scott July 26-August 6. Battle of Richmond July 28. Burnside's Campaign in eastern Tennessee August 16-October 16. Winker's Gap August 31. Action at Cleveland September 18. Athens, Calhoun, and Charleston September 25. Calhoun September 26. Athens September 27. About Kingston October 16–24. Philadelphia October 25–26. Lieper's Ferry, Holston River, October 28. Knoxville Campaign November 4-December 23. Holston River November 15. Campbell's Station November 16. Near Knoxville November 16. Siege of Knoxville November 17-December 5. Skirmishes about Bean's Station December 9–13. Bean's Station December 10 and 14. Blain's Cross Roads December 16–19. Bend of Chucky Road, near Dandridge, January 16, 1864. Operations about Dandridge January 16–17. Dandridge January 17. Operations about Dandridge January 26–28. Flat and Muddy Creek January 26. Near Fair Garden January 27. Kelly's Ford January 27–28. Moved to Marysville, then to Knoxville and dismounted, then moved to Mount Sterling, Ky., February 1864. Duty at Mt. Sterling February 22-April 6. Moved to Camp Nelson, Kentucky, April 6, then to Knoxville, Tennessee, arriving May 3. Movement to Tunnel Hill, Georgia, May 3–5. Atlanta Campaign May 5-September 8. Demonstrations on Dalton May 9–13. Battle of Resaca May 14–15. Cartersville May 18. Advance on Dallas May 18–25. Operations on line of Pumpkin Vine Creek and battles about Dallas, New Hope Church, and Allatoona Hills May 25-June 5. Operations about Marietta and against Kennesaw Mountain June 10-July 2. Lost Mountain June 15–17. Muddy Creek June 17. Noyes' Creek June 19. Cheyney's Farm June 22. Olley's Creek June 26–27. Assault on Kennesaw June 27. Line of Nickajack Creek July 2–5. Chattahoochie River July 5–17. Siege of Atlanta July 22-August 25. Utoy Creek August 5–7. Flank movement on Jonesboro August 25–30. Battle of Jonesboro August 31-September 1. Lovejoy's Station September 2–6. Operations against Hood and Forrest in northern Georgia and northern Alabama September 29-November 3. Nashville Campaign November–December. Columbia, Duck River, November 24–27. Battle of Franklin November 30. Battle of Nashville December 15–16. Pursuit of Hood to the Tennessee River December 17–29. At Clifton, Tennessee, until January 15, 1865. Movement to Washington, D.C., then to Fort Fisher, North Carolina, January 18-February 9. Operations against Hoke February 11–14. Fort Anderson February 18. Capture of Fort Anderson February 19. Town Creek February 19–20. Capture of Wilmington February 22. Carolinas Campaign March 1-April 26. Advance on Goldsbow March 6–21. Occupation of Goldsboro March 21. Gurley's March 31. Advance on Raleigh April 10–14. Occupation of Raleigh April 14. Bennett's House April 26. Surrender of Johnston and his army. Duty at Greensboro, North Carolina, until June 20.

== Casualties ==
The regiment lost a total of 234 men during service; 4 officers and 76 enlisted men killed or mortally wounded, 1 officer and 153 enlisted men died of disease.

== Commanders ==
- Colonel Thomas J. Henderson - promoted to brevet brigadier general November 30, 1864
- Lieutenant Colonel Emery S. Bond - commanded the regiment at rank until muster out

== See also ==
- List of Illinois Civil War units
- Illinois in the Civil War
