= 7th Ohio Cavalry Regiment =

- Active: 1862–1865
- Country: United States of America
- Allegiance: Union
- Branch: Union Army
- Type: Cavalry
- Part of: Army of the Ohio, Cavalry Corps
- Nickname: River Regiment
- Engagements: Sanders' Knoxville Raid; Morgan's Raid; Battle of Buffington Island; Battle of the Cumberland Gap; Knoxville Campaign; Atlanta campaign Battle of Cynthiana; Franklin-Nashville Campaign; Wilson's Raid

Commanders
- Notable commanders: Israel Garrard

The 7th Ohio Cavalry Regiment was a regiment of Union cavalry raised in southern Ohio for service during the American Civil War. Nicknamed the "River Regiment" as its men came from nine counties along the Ohio River, it served in the Western Theater in several major campaigns of the Army of the Ohio.

== Organization and service ==
The 7th Ohio Cavalry Regiment was organized in Ripley, Ohio, on October 3, 1862, under Col. Israel Garrard.

The regiment primarily operated in Kentucky, Tennessee, and western North Carolina, seeing action in several campaigns and cavalry raids as part of the Army of the Ohio. It was part of the Union forces hastily sent northward in the summer of 1863 in pursuit of Morgan's Raiders, seeing action at the Battle of Buffington Island where much of Morgan's command was captured. Colonel Garrard accepted the surrender of the Confederates under Col. Basil W. Duke, although Brig. Gen. John Hunt Morgan escaped with a portion of the raiders.

Participating in the Knoxville Campaign in the autumn of 1863, the regiment suffered a significant setback in a small skirmish in Greeneville, Tennessee, on November 6. Confederate Maj. Gen. Robert Ransom, Jr., and Brig. Gen. William E. "Grumble" Jones dispersed Union cavalry and infantry in the area, seizing numerous prisoners from the 7th Ohio Cavalry and the 2nd East Tennessee Mounted Infantry Regiments.

In July 1864, the regiment moved from Tennessee into Georgia and joined the forces of Maj. Gen. William T. Sherman during the Atlanta campaign. It participated in numerous skirmishes and engagements with Confederate cavalry until the fall of Atlanta in late July. The regiment then accompanied the army of George H. Thomas northward back into Tennessee during the Franklin-Nashville Campaign, again engaged in scouting and periodic skirmishes with the Confederates, particularly during the retreat of the beaten Army of Tennessee as it withdrew towards the Tennessee River.

In March 1865, the regiment participated in Wilson's Raid into Alabama and was among the troops to enter Selma. It pursued retreating Confederates as far as the Andersonville Prison in Georgia, where news was received that Robert E. Lee had surrendered in Virginia.

The regiment was mustered out on July 4, 1865, and returned home to Ohio. During the war, the regiment lost 2 officers and 26 enlisted men killed and mortally wounded, and 4 officers and 197 enlisted men by disease, for a total of 229 fatalities. According to the Sultana Disaster Museum in Marion, Arkansas, 28 lives were lost in the steamer Sultana disaster on April 27, 1865, as the men were returning home.

Following the war, veterans frequently met to remember the war and their fallen comrades, and many became active in local posts of the Grand Army of the Republic.

== Notable Members ==
- Captain Leander Woods, part of the detachment that captured Confederate President Jefferson Davis
