= Leander Woods =

- Died: October 31, 1932 (aged 88); Dayton, Ohio, U.S.
- Military career
- Allegiance: Union
- Branch: Cavalry
- Unit: 7th Ohio Cavalry Regiment
- Known for: Part of the detachment who captured Jefferson C. Davis

Captain Leander Woods was a member of the detachment of soldiers who participated in the reward for the capture of Jefferson Davis.

== During the war ==
Captain Woods volunteered with the 7th Ohio Cavalry Regiment. He took part in several battles, was captured and spent several months in a Confederate prison.

Captain Woods was sent with a detachment to find Jefferson Davis. The cavalrymen disguised themselves as Confederate troopers. Captain Woods was guarding a bridge a short distance away from the capture.

== After the war ==
Captain Leander Woods shared the $100,000 reward from President Andrew Johnson. He returned to a career on a steamboat and commanded several of the largest boats on the Ohio River before retiring more than fifty-years later.

He died on October 31, 1932 at the National Military Home in Dayton, Ohio at the age of 88.
