= 22nd Ohio Independent Light Artillery Battery =

22nd Ohio Battery
- Active: April 1, 1863, to July 13, 1865
- Country: United States
- Allegiance: Union
- Branch: Artillery
- Engagements: Morgan's Raid; Battle of Cumberland Gap

22nd Ohio Battery was an artillery battery that served in the Union Army during the American Civil War.

== Service ==
The 22nd Ohio Battery was organized as one section on April 1, 1863, under Captain Henry M. Neil and sent into the field. It later completed organization as a full battery at Camp Chase in Columbus, Ohio and mustered in July 14, 1863, for a three-year enlistment.

The battery was attached to Willcox's Left Wing, IX Corps, Department of the Ohio, to October 1863. DeCourcy's Brigade, Cumberland Gap, Willcox's Left Wing, IX Corps, to January 1864. District of the Clinch, Department of the Ohio, to April 1864. 1st Brigade, 4th Division, XXIII Corps, Department of the Ohio, to August 1864. 2nd Brigade, 4th Division, XXIII Corps, to February 1865. 2nd Brigade, 4th Division, District of East Tennessee, Department of the Cumberland, to July 1865.

The 22nd Ohio Battery mustered out of service at Camp Chase on July 13, 1865.

== Detailed service ==
Moved to Wheeling, West Virginia, April 1. Duty there and in Holmes County, Ohio, until June. Moved to Camp Chase, Ohio, June 19. Moved to Parkersburg, West Virginia, then to Wheeling, West Virginia, and, to Hancock, Maryland, to support Kelly's operations against General Lee in his retreat from Gettysburg. Sent to operate against Morgan, July. Moved to Camp Nelson, Kentucky, August 12, 1863. Expedition to Cumberland Gap August 17-September 7. Operations about Cumberland Gap September 7–10. Capture of Cumberland Gap September 9. Duty there until June 27, 1864. Action at Crab Gap December 5. 1863. Reconnaissance from Cumberland Gap January 3, 1864. Near Cumberland Gap June 21. Moved to Knoxville, Tennessee, June 27, 1864, and garrison duty there until July 5, 1865. Ordered to Camp Chase, Ohio, July 5.

== Casualties ==
The battery lost a total of 20 men during service; 1 officer and 2 enlisted men killed or mortally wounded, 1 officer and 16 enlisted men died due to disease.

== Commanders ==
- Captain Henry M. Neil

== See also ==
- List of Ohio Civil War units
- Ohio in the Civil War
