= 1st Georgia Cavalry Regiment =

- Georgia State flag prior to 1879
- Active: May 28, 1862–April 26, 1865
- Country: Confederate States of America
- Allegiance: Georgia
- Branch: Confederate States Army
- Type: Regiment
- Role: Cavalry
- Size: ~1000 (initial); 2244 (overall)
- Engagements: American Civil War: Battle of Murfreesboro; Battle of Nashville (1862); Battle of Big Hill; Pegrams Kentucky Raid; Expedition to Monticello; Battle of Chickamauga; Siege of Chattanooga; Battle of Philadelphia; Siege of Knoxville; Atlanta campaign; Battle of Sunshine Church; Savannah Campaign; Carolinas campaign

Commanders
- Notable commanders: Col. James J. Morrison; Col. Samuel W. Davitte; Ltc. George T. Watts

The 1st Georgia Cavalry Regiment was a cavalry regiment in the Confederate States Army, during the American Civil War.

It fought from 1862 to 1865, and mostly served in the Army of Tennessee.

== Service ==
In late 1861 the 1st Georgia Cavalry assembled at Rome, Georgia, and was mustered into the Confederate States Army on May 28, 1862.

Sent to Tennessee it served in the Department of East Tennessee, until assigned to the Army of Tennessee.

For the duration of the civil war it switched between these two for numerous times; the only change being a stint with the Department of South Carolina, Georgia, and Florida in early 1865, before returning to the AoT.

It was surrendered as part of this army at Bennett Place in North Carolina on April 26, 1865; fielding less than 50 men.

== Commanders ==
- Col. James J. Morrison
- Col. Samuel W. Davitte
- Ltc. Armistead R. Harper
- Ltc. James H. Strickland
- Maj. John W. Trench
- Ltc. George T. Watts

== See also ==
- List of Georgia Confederate Civil War regiments
