= 11th Kentucky Cavalry Regiment =

- Active: July 1862 - July 17, 1865
- Country: United States
- Allegiance: Union
- Branch: Cavalry
- Engagements: Battle of Buffington Island; Knoxville Campaign; Atlanta campaign Battle of Kennesaw Mountain; Siege of Atlanta; Battle of Saltville; Second Battle of Saltville

The 11th Kentucky Cavalry Regiment was a cavalry regiment that served in the Union Army during the American Civil War.

== Service ==
Companies A, C, D, and F of the 11th Kentucky Cavalry Regiment were organized at Harrodsburg, Kentucky, in July 1862. The remainder of the regiment was organized in Louisville, Kentucky, and mustered in on September 26, 1862, and mustered in for three years under the command of Colonel Alexander W. Holeman.

The regiment was attached to District of Western Kentucky, Department of the Ohio, to June 1863. 2nd Brigade, 3rd Division, XXIII Corps, Department of the Ohio, to August 1863. Independent Cavalry Brigade, XXIII Corps, to November 1863. 1st Brigade, 1st Division, Cavalry Corps, Army of the Ohio, to April 1864. 3rd Brigade, Cavalry Division, District of Kentucky, Department of the Ohio, to May 1864. Independent Brigade, Cavalry Division, XXIII Corps, to September 1864. Military District of Kentucky, Department of the Ohio, to March 1865. 2nd Brigade, Cavalry Division, District of East Tennessee, Department of the Cumberland, to July 1865.

The 11th Kentucky Cavalry mustered out of service on July 17, 1865.

== Detailed service ==
Companies A, C, D, and F moved to Frankfort, Kentucky, July 22, 1862, then to Louisville, Kentucky, and joined regiment. Regiment moved to Frankfort, Kentucky, November 1862. Duty there and at Bowling Green, Scottsville, and Gallatin, Tennessee, until December 25, 1862. Hartsville, Tennessee, December 7 (Company E). Moved to Glasgow, Kentucky, December 25, and duty there and at various points in western Kentucky until August 1863. Action at Creelsburg, Kentucky, April 19. Expedition to Monticello and operations in southeast Kentucky April 26 – May 12. Scottsville June 11. Pursuit of Morgan July 2–26. Buffington Island, Ohio, July 19. New Lisbon, Ohio, July 26. Burnside's Campaign in eastern Tennessee August 16 – October 17. Calhoun and Charleston September 25. Philadelphia October 20. Knoxville Campaign November 4 – December 23. Maryeville November 14. Little River November 14–15. Stock Creek November 15. Near Loudon November 15. Near Knoxville November 16. Siege of Knoxville November 17 – December 5. About Bean's Station December 9–13. Operations about Dandridge January 16–17, 1864. Bend of Chucky Road near Dandridge January 16. Dandridge January 17. Flat and Muddy Creeks January 26. Near Fair Garden January 27. French Broad January 28. Moved to Mt. Sterling, Kentucky, February 3–12, and duty there until April. March from Nicholasville, Kentucky, to Dalton, Georgia, April 29 – May 11. Atlanta Campaign May to August. Varnell Station May 11. Demonstration on Dalton May 11–13. Battle of Resaca May 14–15. Operations on line Pumpkin Vine Creek and battles about Dallas, New Hope Church, and Allatoona Hills May 25 – June 5. Burnt Church May 26–27. Mt. Zion Church May 27–28. Allatoona May 30. Operations about Marietta and against Kennesaw Mountain June 10 – July 2. Pine Hill June 11–14. Lost Mountain June 15–17. Muddy Creek June 17. Noyes Creek June 19. Cheyney's Farm June 22. Olley's Creek June 26–27. Assault on Kennesaw June 27. On line of Nickajack Creek July 2–5. On line of Chattahoochie River July 6–17. Siege of Atlanta July 22 – August 25. Stoneman's Raid to Macon July 27 – August 6. Macon and Clinton July 30. Sunshine Church July 30–31. Ordered to Kentucky August 31, and operating against guerrillas in Green River counties until September. Burbridge's Expedition into southwest Virginia September 20 – October 17. Saltsville, Virginia, October 2. Sandy Mountain October 3. Stoneman's Raid into southwest Virginia December 10–29. Bristol December 14. Abington, Virginia, December 15. Marion, Va., December 16. Near Marion December 17–18. Capture of Saltville, Virginia, December 20–21. Jonesboro December 23. Clinch River December 24. At Lexington, Kentucky, until February 1865. Moved to Louisville, then to Knoxville, Tennessee, February 27 – March 9, and to Strawberry Plains March 15. Stoneman's Raid into southwest Virginia and western North Carolina March 21 – April 25. 1865. Statesville, North Carolina, April 10–11. Shallow Ford, North Carolina, April 11. Salisbury April 12. Catawba River near Morgantown April 17. Howard's Gap, Blue Ridge, April 22. Hendersonville April 23. Asheville April 25. Moved to Atlanta, Georgia, then to Louisa, Kentucky.

== Casualties ==
The regiment lost a total of 262 men during service; 1 officer and 23 enlisted men killed or mortally wounded, 2 officers and 236 enlisted men died of disease.

== Commanders ==
- Colonel Alexander W. Holeman

== See also ==
- List of Kentucky Civil War Units
- Kentucky in the Civil War
