= Smith Larimer =

American Civil War Medal of Honor recipient

- Born: March 17, 1829; Richland County, Ohio
- Died: February 20, 1881 (aged 51)
- Burial place: Mansfield, Ohio
- Military career
- Allegiance: United States of America; Union
- Branch: United States Army; Union Army
- Rank: Corporal
- Units: Company G, 2nd Ohio Cavalry
- Conflicts: American Civil War
- Awards: Medal of Honor

Smith Larimer (March 17, 1829 – February 20, 1881) was a corporal in the 2nd Ohio Cavalry, Union Army and a Medal of Honor recipient for his actions at the Battle of Sayler's Creek in the American Civil War.

== Biography ==
Born on March 17, 1829, in Richland County, Ohio, Larimer enlisted in the Army from Columbus. By April 6, 1865, he was serving as a corporal in Company G of the 2nd Ohio Cavalry. On that day, during the Battle of Sayler's Creek in Virginia, he captured the flag of Confederate General Joseph B. Kershaw's headquarters. For this action, he was awarded the Medal of Honor a month later, on May 3.

Larimer's official Medal of Honor citation reads:

Capture of flag of General Kershaw's headquarters.

Larimer died at age 51 on February 20, 1881, and was buried in Mansfield, Ohio. He was one of five people from Richland County to receive the Medal of Honor for actions during the Civil War, the others being David L. Cockley, Joseph Hedges, John H. Ricksecker, and James Wiley.

== See also ==
- List of American Civil War Medal of Honor recipients: G–L
