= Isaac Gause =

American Civil War soldier

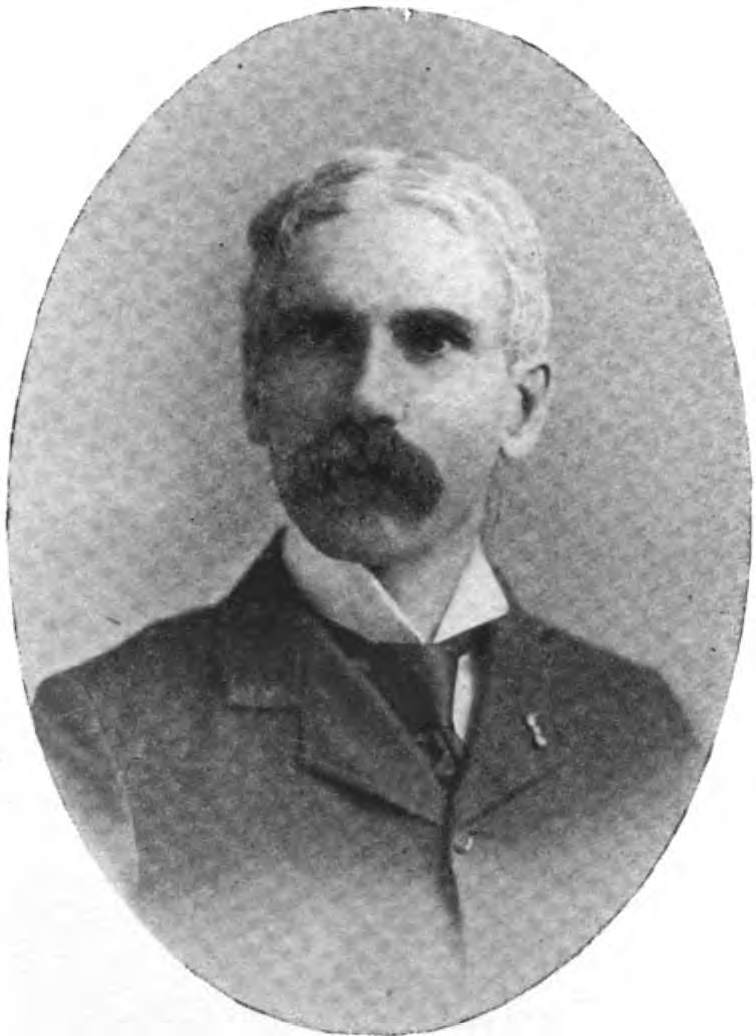
- Medal of Honor winner Isaac Gause c1908
- Born: December 9, 1843; Trumbull County, Ohio, US
- Died: April 23, 1920 (aged 76)
- Burial place: Arlington National Cemetery
- Military career
- Allegiance: United States of America; Union
- Branch: United States Army; Union Army
- Service years: 1861 - 1865
- Rank: Sergeant
- Units: Company E, 2nd Ohio Volunteer Cavalry Regiment
- Conflicts: American Civil War
- Awards: Medal of Honor

Isaac Gause (December 9, 1843 – April 23, 1920) was a corporal in Union Army during the American Civil War and a recipient of the highest military decoration for valor in combat, the Medal of Honor, for having distinguished himself near Berryville, Virginia, on September 13, 1864.

== Medal of Honor citation ==
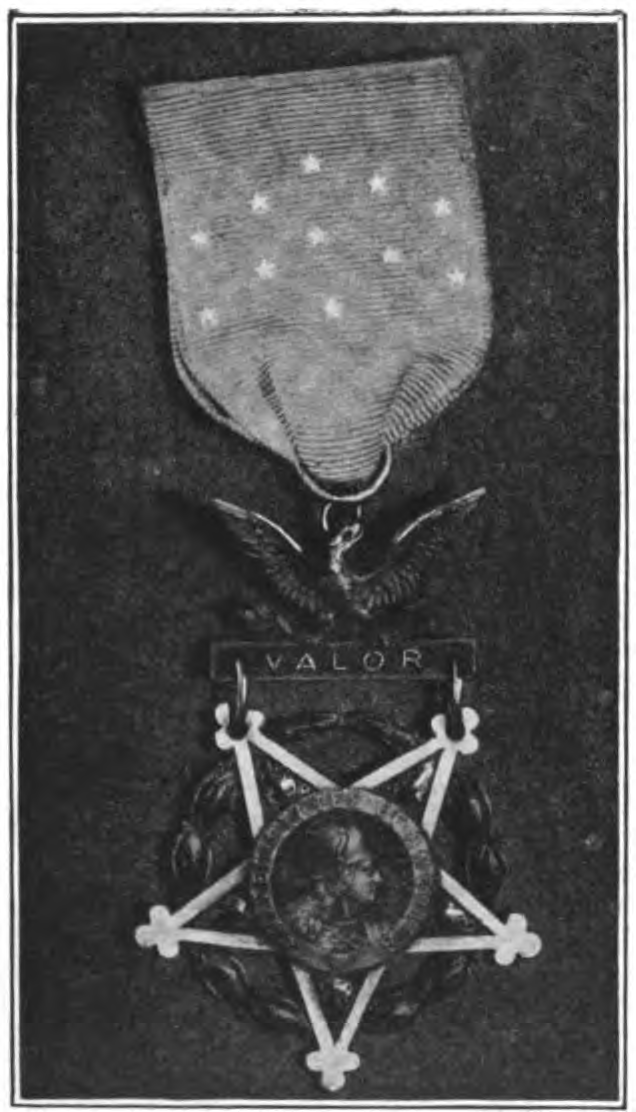
Gause's Medal of Honor

- Rank and organization: Corporal, Company E, 2nd Ohio Cavalry
- Place and date: Near Berryville, Virginia, September 13, 1864
- Birth: Trumbull County, Ohio
- Date of issue: September 19, 1864

Citation:

Capture of the colors of the 8th South Carolina Infantry while engaged in a reconnaissance along the Berryville and Winchester Pike.

== Publications ==
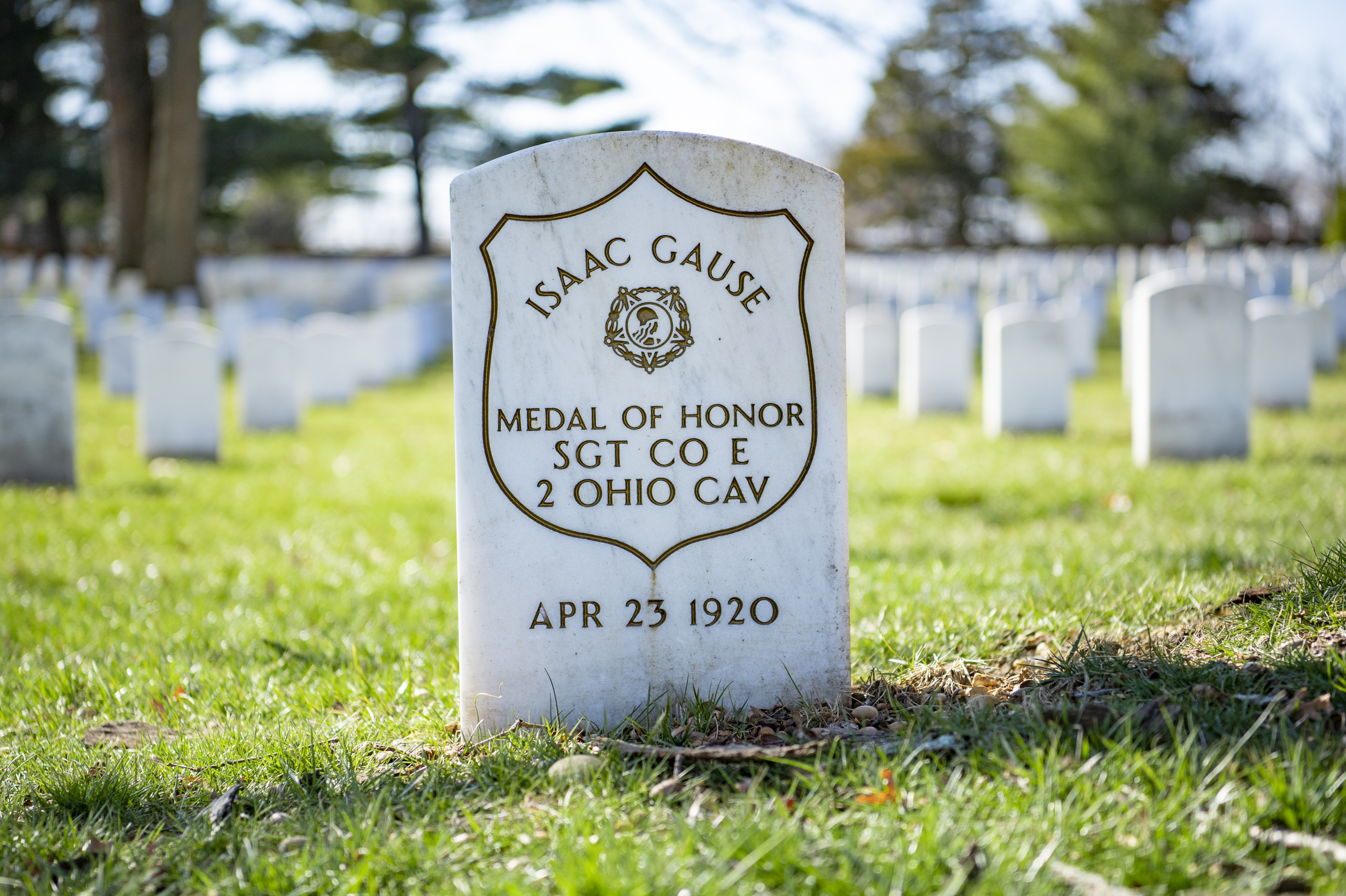
Grave at Arlington National Cemetery

- Gause, Isaac (1908). Four years with five armies: Army of the frontier, Army of the Potomac, Army of the Missouri, Army of the Ohio, Army of the Shenandoah. New York: Neale Publishing.

== See also ==
- List of Medal of Honor recipients
- List of American Civil War Medal of Honor recipients: G–L
