= William L. Copeland =

American politician (1846–1885)

Member of the Arkansas House of Representatives
- In office 1873–1875

Personal details
- Born: 1846
- Died: December 30, 1885 (aged 38–39)
- Cause of death: Homicide
- Party: Republican
- Education: Oberlin College
- Occupation: Politician, police officer

Military service
- Allegiance: United States
- Branch/service: United States Army (Union army)
- Years of service: 1865
- Unit: 2nd Ohio Cavalry Regiment

William L. Copeland (1846 - December 30, 1885) was an American police officer, government official, and state legislator in Arkansas. He was born in Ohio and studied at Oberlin College in Ohio. On March 7, 1865, at the end of the American Civil War, he joined Company C, 2nd Ohio Cavalry Regiment, of the Union Army. At the end of the war, he returned to Oberlin College, where he studied from 1867–69.

He served in the Arkansas House of Representatives from 1873 until 1875 representing Crittenden County. He was appointed assessor of Crittenden County. In 1876 he was the Republican candidate for Arkansas Secretary of State. A letter he wrote to his wife survives. The Daily Arkansas Gazette described him as "Colored". He was a Republican.

Copeland may have been the first Little Rock police officer killed in the line of duty. Copeland was killed after being assaulted by a jail trusty who was on work release.
