= 1st Kentucky Cavalry Regiment (Union) =

- Active: October 28, 1861 – September 20, 1865
- Country: United States
- Allegiance: Union
- Branch: Union Army
- Role: Cavalry
- Engagements: American Civil War: Battle of Perryville; Knoxville Campaign; Atlanta campaign; Battle of Kennesaw Mountain

The 1st Kentucky Cavalry Regiment was a cavalry regiment that served in the Union Army during the American Civil War.

== Service ==
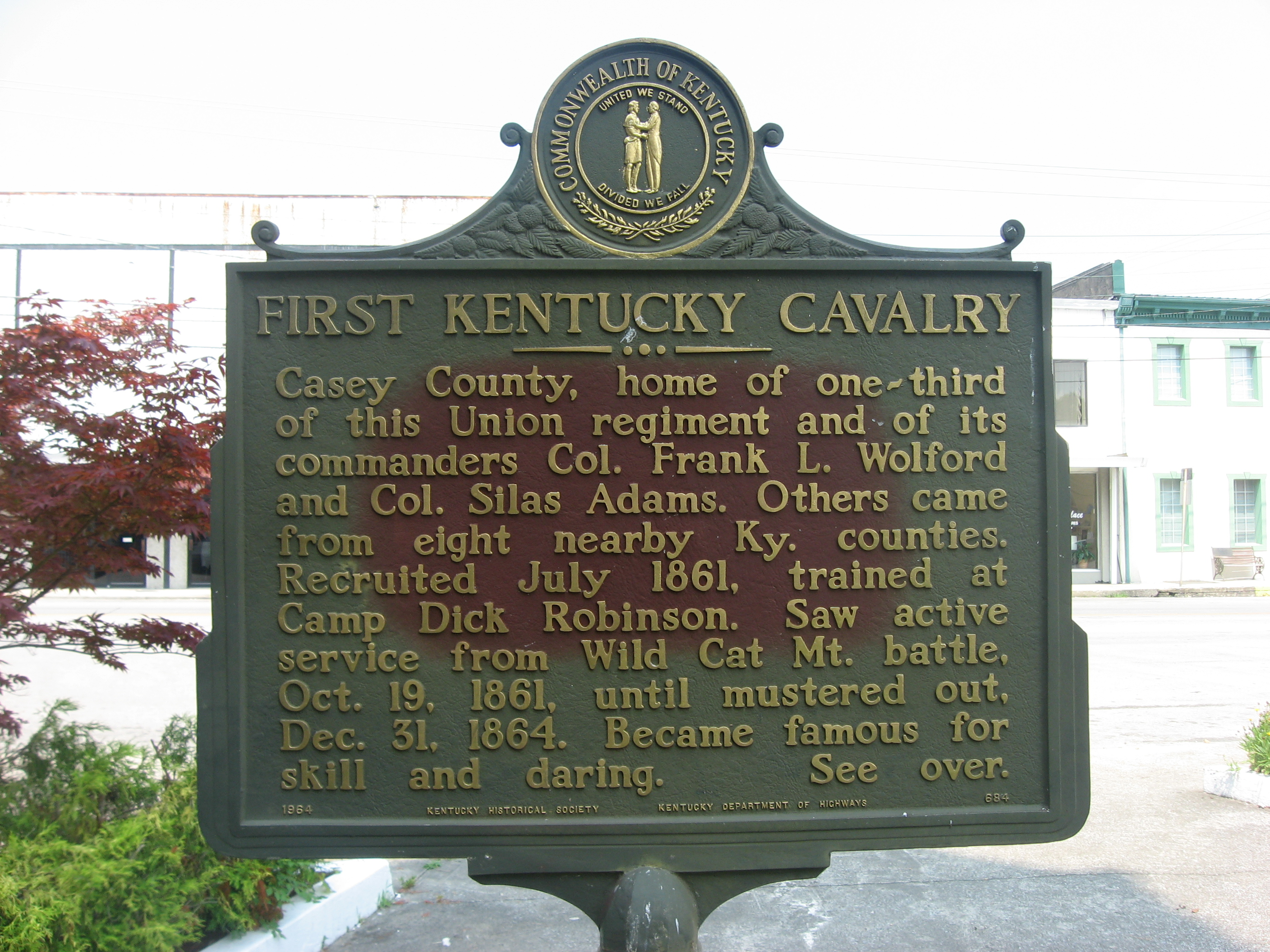
Historical marker to the regiment in Liberty

The 1st Kentucky Cavalry Regiment was organized at Liberty, Burkesville, and Monticello, Kentucky and mustered in for a three-year enlistment on October 28, 1861. It was mustered in under the command of Colonel Frank Lane Wolford.

The regiment was attached to Thomas' Command, Camp Dick Robinson, Kentucky, to December 1861. 1st Division, Army of the Ohio, to March 1862. (5 companies attached to Garfield's 18th Brigade, Army of the Ohio, December 1861 to March 1862.) Unattached, Army of the Ohio, to September 1862. 1st Brigade, Cavalry Division, Army of the Ohio, to November 1862. Post Gallatin, Tennessee, Department of the Cumberland, to April 1863. District of Central Kentucky, Department of the Ohio, to June 1863. 1st Brigade, 1st Division, XXIII Corps, Army of the Ohio, to August 1863. Independent Cavalry Brigade, XXIII Corps, to November 1863. 1st Brigade, 1st Division, Cavalry Corps, Army of the Ohio, to May 1864. Independent Brigade, Cavalry Division, XXIII Corps, to August 1864. 4th Brigade, 1st Division, District of Kentucky, Department of the Ohio, to December 1864. Camp Nelson, Military District of Kentucky, to September 1865.

The 1st Kentucky Cavalry mustered out of service at Camp Nelson on September 20, 1865.

== Detailed service ==
Near Rockcastle Hills October 18, 1861. Camp Wild Cat October 21. Fishing Creek December 8. (5 companies sent to Prestonsburg, Kentucky, December 10 and Join Garfield. Garfield's operations against Humphrey Marshall December 23, 1861 to January 20, 1862. Middle Creek, near Prestonburg, January 10, 1862.) Near Logan's Cross Roads, Mill Springs, on Fishing Creek, January 19–20, 1862. Near Cumberland Gap February 14 (detachment). Big Creek Gap and Jacksboro March 14 (detachment). Reconnaissance to Cumberland Gap March 21–23 (1st Battalion). Moved to Nashville, Tennessee, April. Purdy and Lebanon May 5. Duty at Shelbyville, Columbia, Mt. Pleasant, Lawrenceburg, Pulaski, and Murfreesboro, Tennessee, until August. March to Louisville, Kentucky, in pursuit of Bragg August 21-September 26. Capture of 3rd Georgia Cavalry at New Haven September 29. Pursuit of Bragg into Kentucky October 1–22. Near Perryville October 6–7. Battle of Perryville October 8. Danville October 11. Near Mountain Gap October 14 and 16. March to Nashville, Tennessee, October 22-November 7. Ordered to Kentucky, November. Operations against Morgan December 1862 to January 1863. Operations against Pegram, March 22-April 1. Danville March 24. Dutton's Hill, near Somerset, March 30. Expedition to Monticello and operations in southeast Kentucky April 25-May 12. Howe's Ford, Weaver's Store, April 28. Monticello May 1. Neal Springs May. Near Mill Springs May 29. Monticello and Rocky Gap June 9. Sanders' raid in eastern Tennessee June 14–24. Lenoir June 19. Knoxville June 19–20. Strawberry Plains and Rogers' Gap June 20. Powder Springs Gap June 21. Columbia and Creelsborough June 29. Pursuit of Morgan July 2–26. Marrowbone, Burkesville, July 2. Columbia July 3. Martin's Creek July 10. Buffington's Island. Ohio, July 19. Near Lisbon July 26. Operation against Scott in eastern Kentucky. Lancaster and Paint Lick Bridge July 31. Lancaster August 1. Smith's Shoals, Cumberland River, August 1. Burnside's campaign in eastern Tennessee August 16-October 17. Calhoun and Charleston September 25. Near Philadelphia September 27 and October 15. Philadelphia October 20. Motley's Ford, Little Tennessee River, November 4. Knoxville Campaign November 4-December 23. Marysville November 14. Little River November 14–15. Stock Creek November 15. Near Knoxville November 16. Siege of Knoxville November 17-December 5. Pursuit of Longstreet December 5–23. About Bean Station December 9–13. Operations about Dandridge January 16–17, 1864. Bend of Chucky River, near Dandridge, January 16. Dandridge January 17. Flat and Muddy Creek January 26. Seviersville January 26. Near Fair Garden January 27. Moved to Mt. Sterling, Kentucky, February 17–26, and duty there reorganizing until April. March to Tunnel Hill, Georgia, May 1–12. Atlanta Campaign May to September. Demonstrations on Dalton May 9–13. Operations on line of Pumpkin Vine Creek and battles about Dallas, New Hope Church, and Allatoona Hills May 25-June 5. Operations about Marietta and against Kennesaw Mountain June 10-July 2. Lost Mountain June 10 and 15–17. Assault on Kennesaw June 27. Operations on line of Nickajack Creek July 2–5. Campbellton July 4. On line of the Chattahoochie River July 5–17. About Atlanta July 22–27. Stoneman's raid to Macon July 27-August 6. Macon and Clinton July 30. Sunshine Church July 30–31. Ordered to Mt. Sterling, Kentucky, September. Duty at Camp Nelson, Kentucky, and at other points in Kentucky until December. Mustered out December 31, 1864. Veterans and recruits consolidated to a battalion of 3 companies and on duty at various points in Kentucky, operating against guerrillas and quieting country, until September 1865.

== Casualties ==
The regiment lost a total of 344 men during service; 5 officers and 56 enlisted men killed or mortally wounded, 1 officer and 282 enlisted men died of disease.

== Commanders ==
- Colonel William Jennings Landram - resigned before being mustered
- Colonel Frank Lane Wolford
- Colonel Silas Adams

== See also ==
- List of Kentucky Civil War Units
- Kentucky in the Civil War
