= James Jefferson Morrison =

American Confederate officer

James Jefferson Morrison (October 31, 1829 – September 3, 1910) was a Confederate States Army officer during the American Civil War.

Morrison was born in Hopkinsville, Kentucky. He volunteered for the United States Army during the Mexican-American War; serving in the 3rd U.S. Dragoons. There he befriended Jefferson Davis who he sought out at the start of the American Civil War, seeking to establish a cavalry regiment. Davis instead directed him to establish an infantry unit to defend Virginia. He organized the 4th Georgia Infantry Battalion, which soon was consolidated into the 21st Georgia Infantry Regiment, as Lieutenant Colonel. In 1862 he organized the 1st Georgia Cavalry Regiment and became its Colonel. He resigned on April 15, 1864, and was succeeded by Samuel W. Davitte. He lived in Cedartown, Georgia, Decatur, Georgia, and Eastman, Georgia, where he died and is buried in Woodlawn Cemetery.
