= Silas Adams =

American lawyer and politician

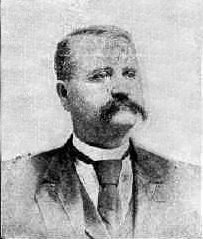

Member of the U.S. House of Representatives from Kentucky's 11th district
- In office March 4, 1893 – March 3, 1895
- Preceded by: John H. Wilson
- Succeeded by: David G. Colson

Member of the Kentucky House of Representatives from Casey and Russell Counties
- In office August 5, 1889 – October 17, 1892
- Preceded by: J. L. Phelps
- Succeeded by: F. P. Combest

Personal details
- Born: February 9, 1839 Pulaski County, Kentucky, U.S.
- Died: May 5, 1896 (aged 57) Liberty, Kentucky, U.S.
- Education: Kentucky University

Military service
- Branch/service: Union Army
- Unit: 1st Kentucky Cavalry Regiment
- Battles/wars: American Civil War

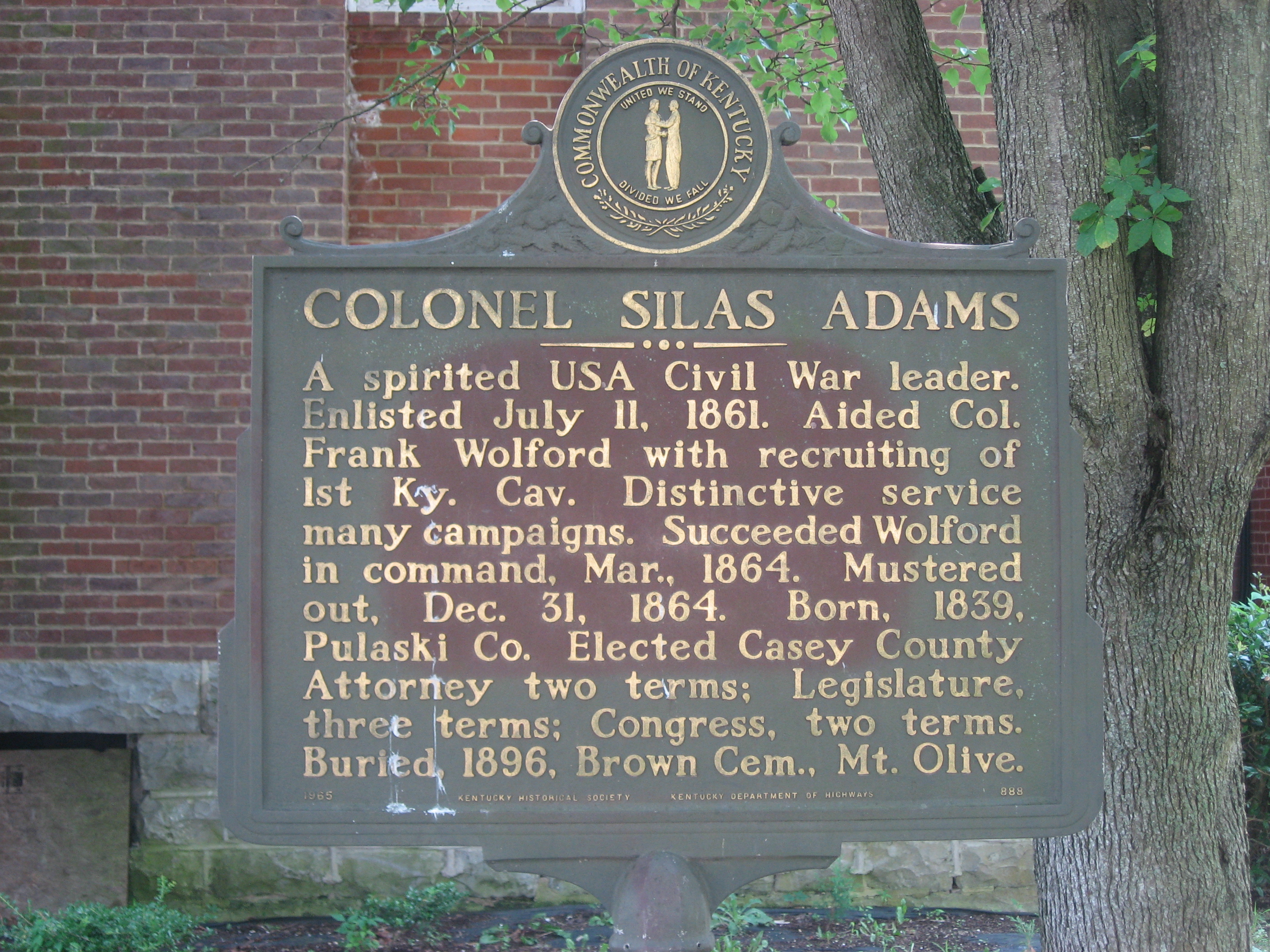
Historical marker to Adams in Liberty, Kentucky

Silas Adams (February 9, 1839 – May 5, 1896) was an American attorney and politician from Kentucky who served for one term as a member of the United States House of Representatives from Kentucky's 11th congressional district.

== Early life and education ==
He was born in Pulaski County, Kentucky, on February 9, 1839, and moved to Casey County with his parents in 1841. He attended Kentucky University (now Transylvania University).

== Career ==
He entered the Union Army during the Civil War as a first lieutenant in the 1st Kentucky Cavalry Regiment. He was later promoted to captain, lieutenant colonel and colonel of the regiment. He was mustered out on December 31, 1864.

His experiences in the cavalry are recorded in the book The Wild Riders of the First Kentucky Cavalry by Eastham Tarrant.

Following the war, he entered the Lexington Law School in 1867. He was later admitted to the bar and practiced law.

He served two terms as county attorney and later was a member of the Kentucky House of Representatives from 1889 to 1892. He led an unsuccessful campaign as a Republican candidate for the United States Senate in 1892. He was later elected as a Republican to the 53rd U.S. Congress (March 4, 1893 – March 3, 1895). He was an unsuccessful independent candidate for re-election in 1894 to the 54th U.S. Congress and thereafter returned to the practice of law.

== Personal life ==
He died in Liberty on May 5, 1896, and was buried in Brown Cemetery in Casey County.
