= George Lucas Hartsuff =

United States Army general

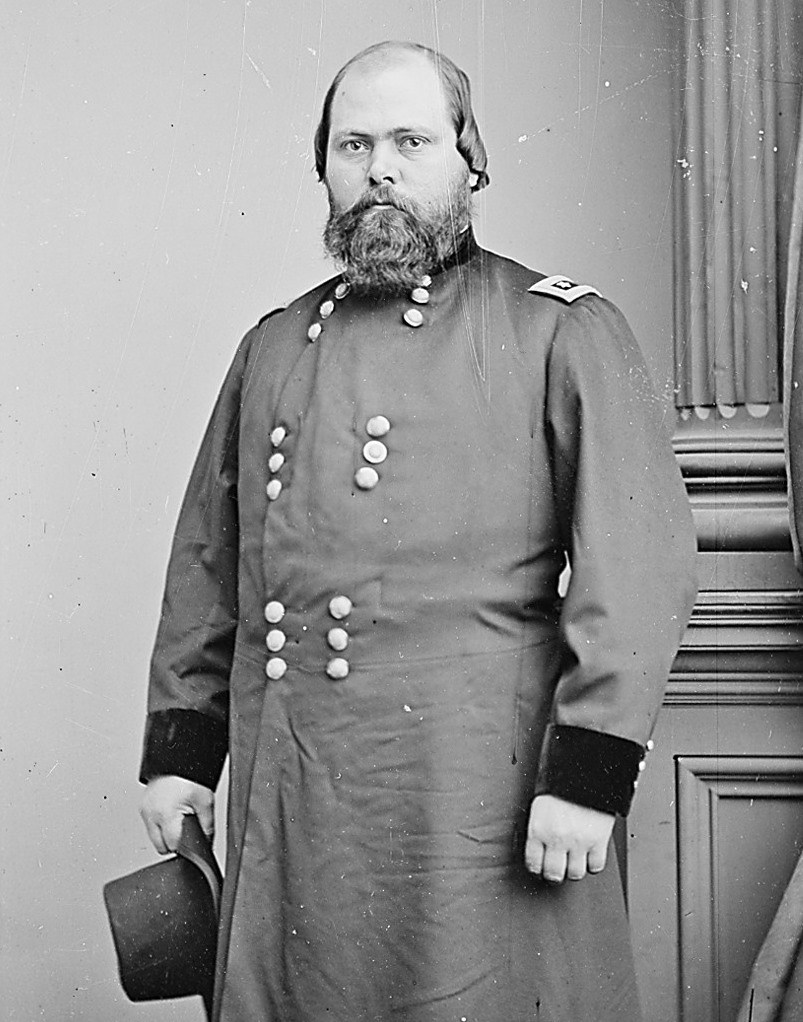
- Born: May 28, 1830; Tyre, New York
- Died: May 16, 1874 (aged 43); West Point, New York
- Burial place: West Point Cemetery
- Military career
- Allegiance: United States of America
- Branch: United States Army; Union Army
- Service years: 1852–1871
- Rank: Major General
- Commands: XXIII Corps
- Conflicts: American Civil War; Battle of Cedar Mountain; Battle of Antietam; Knoxville Campaign

George Lucas Hartsuff (May 28, 1830 – May 16, 1874) was an American soldier, born at Tyre, New York. He graduated at West Point in 1852, graduating 19th out of 43 in his class. He served on the frontier and in Florida, where, during a fight with the Seminole Indians near Fort Myers in December 1855, he received a wound which eventually caused his death. Hartsuff survived the wreck of the steamer Lady Elgin on Lake Michigan on September 8, 1860.

On March 22, 1861, Hartsuff was appointed Assistant Adjutant General with the brevet rank of captain, assigned to the Department of Florida on April 13. He was assigned to the staff of Brigadier General William Rosecrans in West Virginia on August 8, 1861. He held under staff positions, eventually serving briefly as chief of staff of the Mountain Department. Hartsuff became a brigadier general on April 15, 1862. He served in third corps Army of Virginia and then in the Army of the Potomac. Hartsuff was severely wounded in the hip at Antietam while leading a brigade in second division I Corps. Immediately after the battle he was made a brevet colonel in the regular army for gallant and meritorious services.

Hartsuff was promoted to the rank of major general on November 29, 1863. Returning to active duty, he commanded XXIII Corps in the Army of the Ohio from May 28 to September 24, 1863. This period included the early stages of the Knoxville Campaign of MG Ambrose Burnside.

On March 13, 1865, he was given the brevet rank of major general in the regular army, and from March 19, to April 16, of the same year was in command of Bermuda Hundred in the Army of the James. Then he commanded the District of Nottoway in the Department of Virginia from May 22 to August 24.

Hartsuff was mustered out of the volunteer service on August 24, 1865, and served in the regular army as a lieutenant colonel. Hartsuff resigned from the regular army on June 29, 1871, because of disability resulting from wounds received in battle. Hartsuff was retired with the rank of major general. He died on May 16, 1874, and was buried at the West Point Cemetery.

Military offices
Preceded by none, new corps	Commander of the XXIII Corps (ACW); May 28, 1863 – September 24, 1863	Succeeded by Mahlon D. Manson
