= Frank Lane Wolford =

American politician (1817–1895)

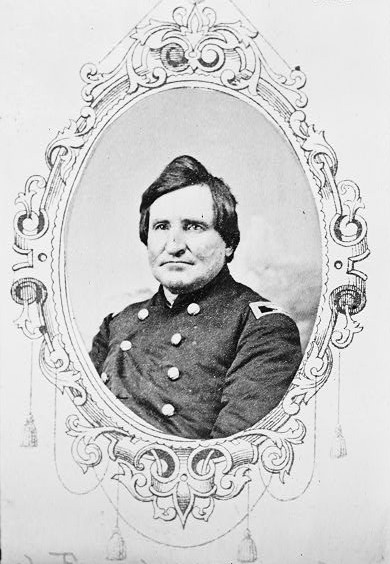
- Frank Wolford, c. 1860-1870

Representative for Kentucky in the Forty-eighth and Forty-ninth United States Congresses
- In office March 4, 1883 - March 3, 1887

Member of the Kentucky House of Representatives
- In office 1847-1848; 1865-1866

Personal details
- Born: September 2, 1817 Near Columbia, Kentucky, US
- Died: August 2, 1895 (aged 77) Columbia, Kentucky, US
- Party: Democratic Party
- Military career
- Allegiance: Union States of America
- Branch: Union Army
- Rank: Colonel
- Unit: 1st Kentucky Cavalry Regiment
- Conflicts: American Civil War

Frank Lane Wolford (September 2, 1817 – August 2, 1895) was a U.S. representative from Kentucky.

Wolford was born near Columbia, Kentucky. He attended the common schools, studied law and was admitted to the bar and commenced practice in Liberty, Kentucky. He served as member of the Kentucky House of Representatives in 1847, 1848, 1865, and 1866. During the American Civil War Wolford served in the Union Army as colonel of the 1st Kentucky Cavalry Regiment which he organized in 1861. In 1864 he was dismissed, and for a time arrested. He served as Adjutant General of the Kentucky militia in 1867 and 1868.

Wolford was elected as a Democrat to the Forty-eighth and Forty-ninth Congresses (March 4, 1883 – March 3, 1887). He was an unsuccessful candidate for reelection to the Fiftieth Congress in 1886. Then he continued the practice of law in Columbia, Kentucky, until his death there on August 2, 1895. He was interred in Columbia Cemetery.

U.S. House of Representatives
Preceded by District re-established	Member of the U.S. House of Representatives from Kentucky's 11th congressional district 1883 – 1887 (obsolete district)	Succeeded by Hugh F. Finley
