= Piatt =

Piatt is a surname. Notable people with the surname include:

== People ==
- Adam Piatt (born 1976), American professional baseball outfielder
- Abram S. Piatt (1821–1908), Union general in the American Civil War
- Donn Piatt (1819–1891), American journalist and writer
- John James Piatt (1835–1917), American poet
- Sarah Morgan Bryan Piatt (1836–1919), American poet
- Wiley Piatt (1874–1946), American professional baseball pitcher
- Wendy Piatt (born 1976), British director

== People with middle name ==
- A. Piatt Andrew (1873–1936), American economist and politician

== Places ==
=== United States ===
- Piatt Township, Pennsylvania
- Piatt County, Illinois
- Piatt's Landing, Kentucky
- Piatt Castles, Logan County, Ohio
- Piatt Park, Cincinnati, Ohio
- https://www.monroecountyohio.com/departments/parks_and_recreation/piatt_park.php, Monroe County, Ohio

== See also ==
- Piat (disambiguation)
