= Benjamin Piatt Runkle =

American military officer (1836–1916)

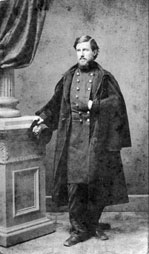
- Benjamin Piatt Runkle
- Born: September 3, 1836; West Liberty, Ohio, U.S.
- Died: June 28, 1916 (aged 79); Hillsboro, Ohio, U.S.
- Burial place: Arlington National Cemetery
- Relatives: Abram S. Piatt (uncle); Donn Piatt (uncle)
- Military career
- Allegiance: United States
- Branch: United States Army
- Service years: 1861–1870
- Rank: Colonel; Brevet Major General
- Unit: 13th Ohio Infantry
- Commands: 45th Ohio Infantry; Cavalry Brigade, Gilmore's Division, Department of the Ohio; 3rd Brigade, 4th Division, XXIII Corps
- Conflicts: American Civil War; Battle of Carnifex Ferry; Battle of Shiloh; Battle of Dutton's Hill Monument; Defense of Cincinnati; Morgan's Raid; Battle of Rocky Face Ridge; Battle of Resaca
- Other work: Freedmen's Bureau; Episcopal priest; Miami University trustee

Benjamin Piatt Runkle (September 3, 1836 – June 28, 1916) was an American military officer, Episcopal priest, and Freemason, who is noted as being one of the seven founders of Sigma Chi fraternity. Prior to joining the clergy, he served in the Union Army during the American Civil War. He served as Chief Superintendent of Freedmen's Affairs in Kentucky, and was plaintiff in the Supreme Court case Runkle v. United States. Runkle also twice served as trustee of Miami University.

== Early life ==
Runkle was born in West Liberty, Ohio, to Ralph Edwin Runkle and Hannah Isabella Piatt. He attended Geneva College and, later, Miami University, from which he graduated in July 1857. While attending Miami University, Runkle became a Freemason as well as one of the seven founders of the Sigma Chi fraternity.

Runkle married Venitia Reynolds on June 4, 1857, and their daughter, Maud Elizabeth Runkle, was born on January 15, 1859, in Findlay, Ohio. After college, he studied law under General Samson Mason in Springfield and was admitted to the bar in July 1859. He was the 1860 Democratic candidate for the Ohio State Senate. Runkle volunteered for an Ohio militia company and, when the Civil War began, it became a part of the 13th Ohio Infantry.

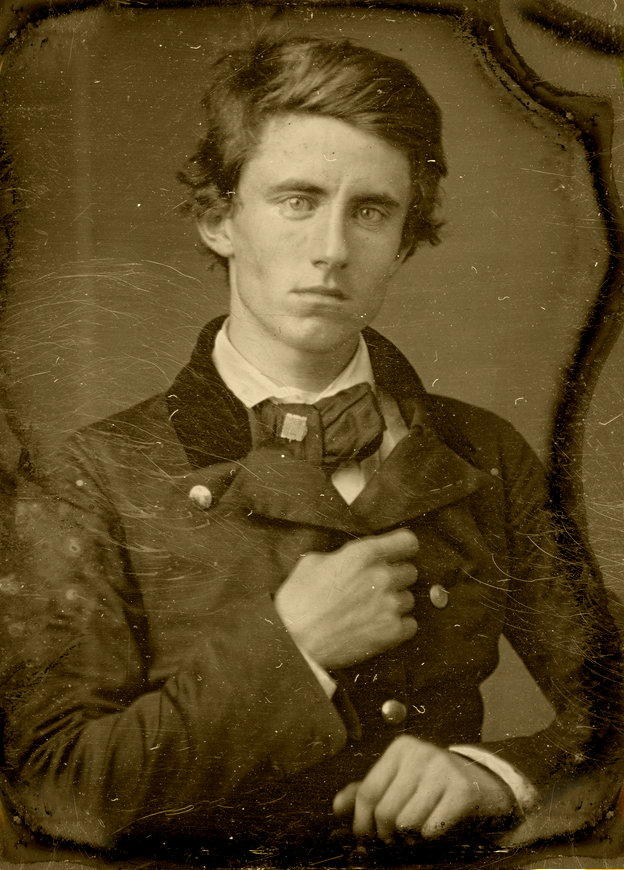
Daguerreotype image of Benjamin Piatt Runkle circa 1857, then an undergraduate student at Miami University in Oxford, Ohio, around the time of the founding of the then-called "Sigma Chi Society."

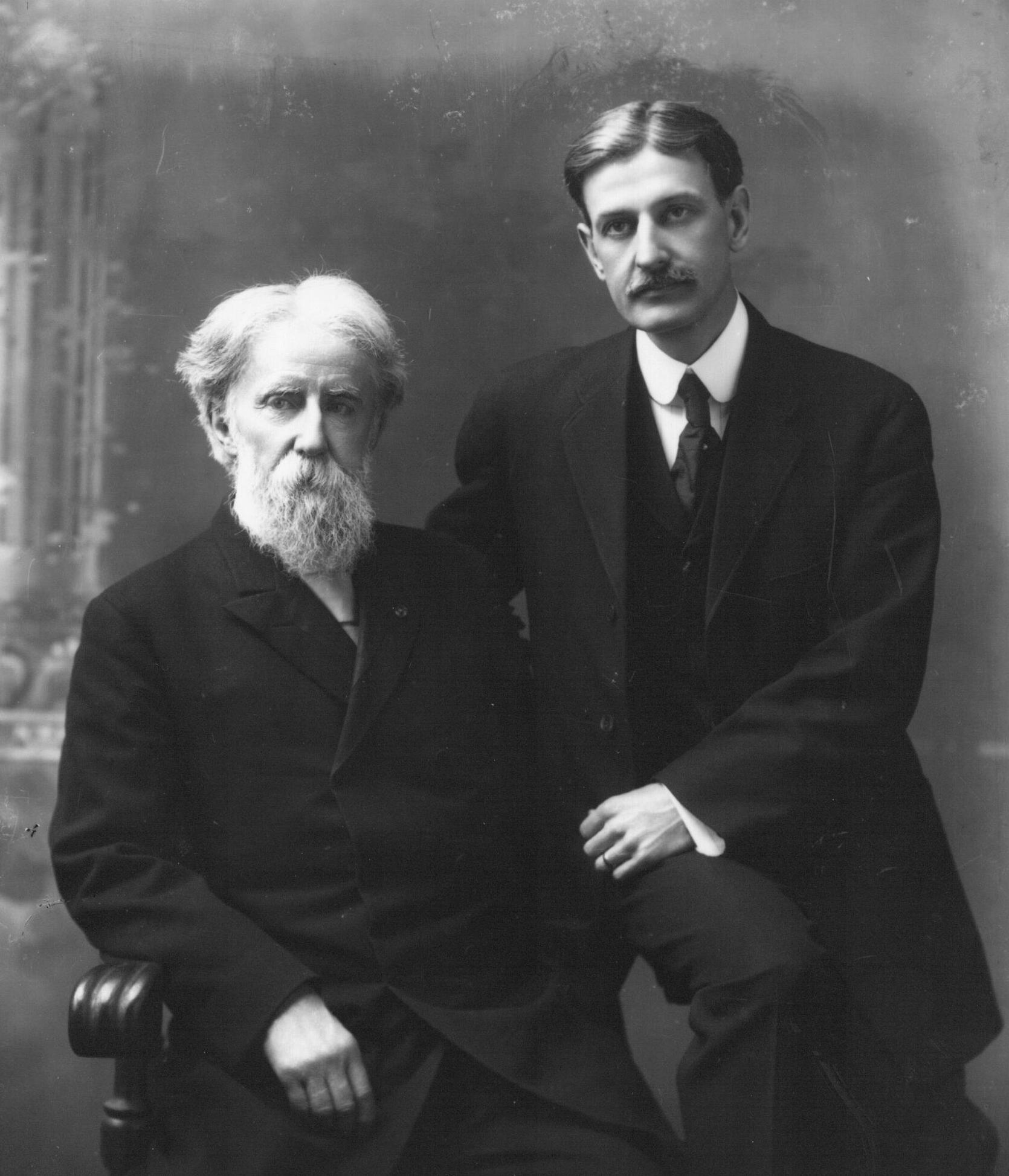
Runkle (left) with Dr. Joseph Nate at Miami University

== Civil War ==
=== 13th Ohio Infantry ===
Runkle was commissioned as a captain in the 13th Ohio Infantry on April 22, 1861, and served as such until November 8, 1861, when he was promoted to the rank of major after the Battle of Carnifex Ferry. In April 1862 the 13th Ohio, then in Virginia, made a forced march to join General Don Carlos Buell's forces in Kentucky, then continued with Buell's forces to the Battle of Shiloh. Upon arrival, the regiment led an attack that captured the Washington Artillery Battery of New Orleans. He was shot through the feet during a Confederate counter-attack, but continued until wounded again with a shot through the right jaw. He was thought to be mortally wounded, and Whitelaw Reid, then a correspondent for the Cincinnati Gazette, had seen Runkle's wounds and filed a glowing obituary saying in part "He died a hero. Green grows the grass above his grave." Runkle not only survived but outlived Reid, and in turn praised him in an obituary. He was promoted to lieutenant colonel in May 1862.

=== 45th Ohio Infantry ===
After recovering from his wounds, on August 19, 1862, he was commissioned Colonel of the 45th Ohio Infantry. The regiment was ordered to Cynthiana, Kentucky, where it remained until General Kirby Smith's advance following the Confederate victory at the Battle of Richmond, Kentucky on August 30, 1862, forced the 45th Ohio, along with the 99th Ohio Infantry, to pull back to the Ohio River at Covington, Kentucky, where they participated in the Defense of Cincinnati. In mid– February the regiment was mounted at Danville, Kentucky, and Colonel Runkle commanded the brigade formed by the mounted 45th Ohio along with the 7th Ohio Cavalry and 10th Kentucky Cavalry regiments. Runkle's men broke the enemy line at the Battle of Dutton's Hill in Somerset, Kentucky on March 30, 1863, and he was thanked for his gallantry on the field by Quincy Gillmore, the commanding general, who gave Colonel Runkle's command entire credit for the victory. Fought in the Battle at Monticello, Kentucky on May 1, 1863, where Confederate forces under General Pegram were driven from the field.

=== Other commands ===
From July 1863 to January 1864, while recovering from wounds, he served on the staff of Ohio governor David Tod and led Ohio Militia units in response to Morgan's Raid. He later commanded the 3rd Brigade of the 4th Division of the XXIII Corps in Kentucky and Tennessee and participated in Sherman's Atlanta campaign at the battles of Rocky Face Ridge and Resaca. Runkle was honorably mustered out July 21, 1864, and on August 29, 1864, he was appointed lieutenant colonel in the Veteran Reserve Corps where he commanded the 21st Regiment until the war ended.

== Freedmen's Bureau ==
While in the Veteran Reserve Corps, Runkle was assigned to work at the Bureau of Refugees, Freedmen, and Abandoned Lands (Freedmen's Bureau) where he served as Chief Superintendent of the Freedmen's Bureau for Memphis, Tennessee.

On January 13, 1866, President Andrew Johnson nominated Runkle for appointment to the grade of brevet brigadier general of volunteers, to rank from November 9, 1865, and the United States Senate confirmed the appointment on March 12, 1866.

He served as the Chief Superintendent of the Freedmen's Bureau for Memphis, Tennessee during the violent Memphis Riots of 1866 on May 1, 1866, where, since he had few troops available, he was powerless to protect the black Union veterans who had been mustered out of the army the previous day. On January 7, 1869, Runkle became the head Superintendent of Freedmen's Affairs, State of Kentucky. Since the government had announced plans to terminate Freedmen's Bureau operations in Kentucky, Runkle, and his caretaker staff presided over bureau school closings and the dispersal of the remaining funds, which were completed in the summer of 1870, although the veterans' claim offices remained open through June 1872. While serving as both an active duty army major and as a disbursing officer of the Freedmen's Bureau for the State of Kentucky in 1870, he was placed on the retired list as major, but continued as a disbursing officer until he was arrested and tried before a court-martial for financial irregularities on the part of his sub-agents for "alleged failures to pay, or to pay in full".

== Court-martial ==
The court-martial found Runkle guilty of conduct unbecoming an officer and gentleman and of violating the March 2, 1863, c. 67, § 1, Act of Congress. His sentence was imprisonment, payment of a fine, and dismissal from the army, where he had been serving on the retired list and drawing retired pay. The Secretary of War, William W. Belknap, reviewed the proceedings and in 1873 issued an order approving Runkle's conviction, but in consideration of his war service and wounds, granted Runkle executive clemency in the name of the President and eliminated the fine and prison sentence. However, his dismissal from the army remained in effect. Under the law at that time, any court-martial sentence involving an officer's dismissal in peacetime needed to be confirmed by the President, and there was no indication in this order that the conviction was confirmed by President Ulysses S. Grant himself.

On the same day that he was cashiered, Runkle petitioned President Grant, complaining that his sentence had not been confirmed by the President. This petition was referred by Grant to the Judge Advocate General for review. Runkle objected to the court-martial specifically because President Grant had appointed the officers who served on it. Initially, General Joseph Holt, the Judge Advocate General, determined that the court-martial conformed to the Articles of War and that because the president, as commander in chief, had an inherent authority to convene courts-martial, Grant's role in Runkle's trial was sound. It remained open when President Rutherford B. Hayes came into office, as President Grant had done nothing further in the matter. On the advice of Holt's successor, General William McKee Dunn, Hayes then picked it up as unfinished business and registered an order of disapproval, revoking the 1873 order dismissing Runkle.

== Supreme Court Case – Runkle v. United States ==
On the authority of the executive order, Runkle was given retirement pay – both from the date of the Hayes order going forward and back pay to the date he was dismissed. In 1882, he claimed additional longevity pay, which was referred to the Court of Claims. In the Court of Claims, however, the government challenged his right to any pay at all, asserting that Hayes did not have the right to revoke the 1873 order confirming Runkle's dismissal, and demanded Runkle reimburse the government for the pay he had received following Hayes' disapproval of the court-martial decision. Runkle appealed to the Supreme Court, which found in his favor, ruling that Runkle was never legally dismissed from the army, and was entitled to longevity pay, as well as the regular pay he already received, both before and after Secretary Belknap's order was revoked.

== Later life ==
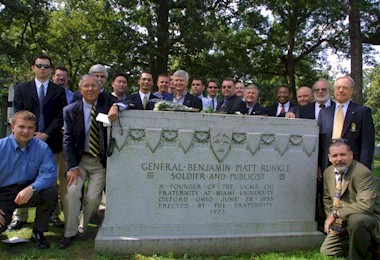
Benjamin Piatt Runkle memorial

When he retired from military service in 1870, Runkle was a major and brevetted colonel in the Regular Army. From 1879– to 1880 he studied at the Protestant Episcopal Theological Seminary in Gambier, Ohio, and from 1880–1885 served as rector of parishes at Galena, Ohio, Midland, Michigan, Minneapolis, Minnesota, and Greencastle, Indiana. Runkle married his second wife, Lalla McMicken, February 10, 1894, in Los Angeles, California. Runkle was the only founder of Sigma Chi to become Grand Consul, serving as the seventh national president from 1895 to 1897.

Runkle held commands at the Peekskill Military Academy, the Military School in Freehold, New Jersey, and at the Miami Military Institute in Germantown, Ohio from 1902 to 1909. He served as trustee of Miami University from 1863–1872 and from 1912 until his death. Runkle died at his home in Hillsboro, Ohio on June 28, 1916, the fraternity's sixty-first birthday. He is buried in Arlington National Cemetery, Section 1, Grave 240, in Virginia.

== See also ==
- List of American Civil War brevet generals (Union)
