= Old Church Cemetery (Cobh) =

Historical cemetery in Cobh, County Cork, Ireland

Coordinates: 51.86342°N 8.29822°W

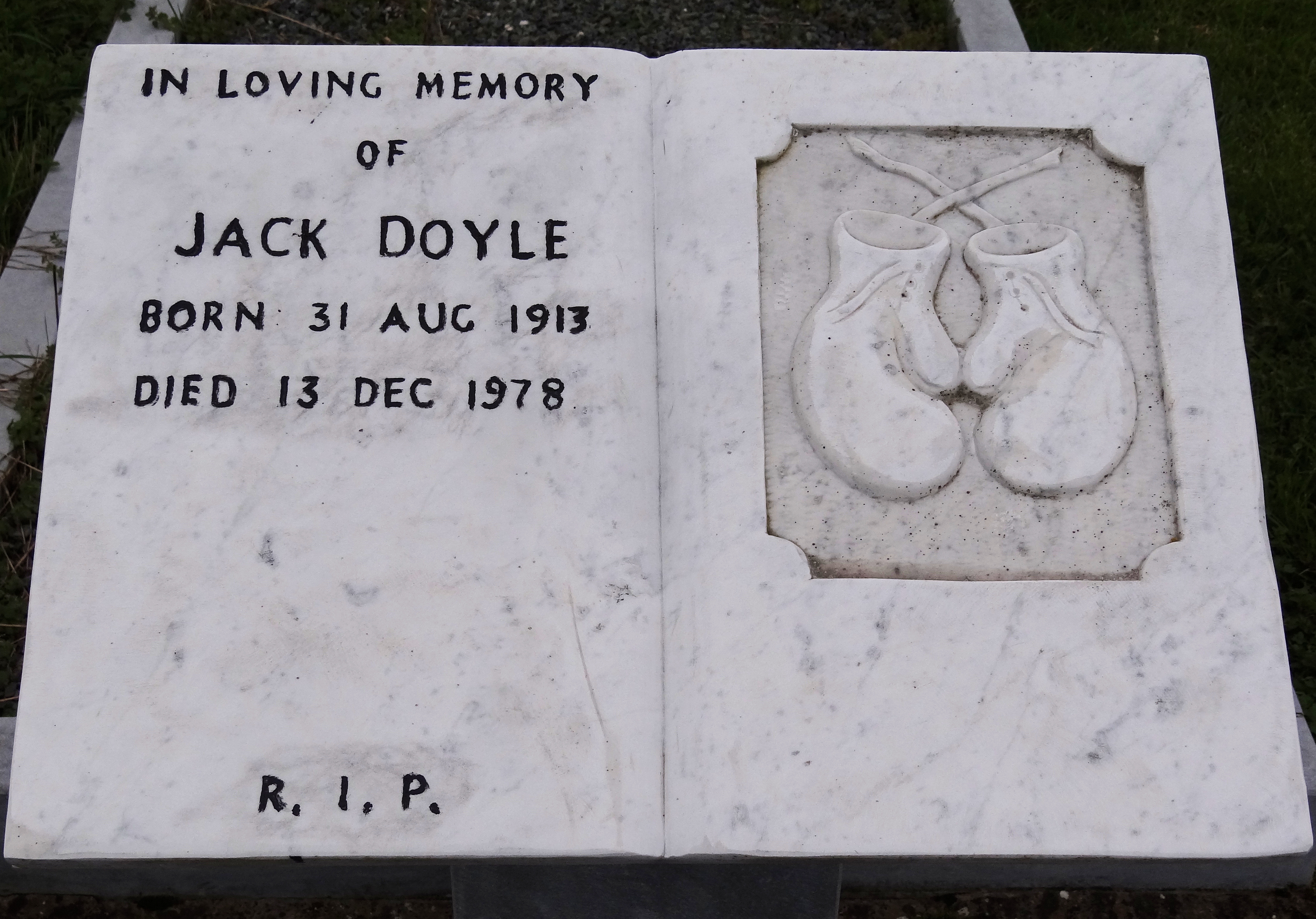
Jack Doyle's grave

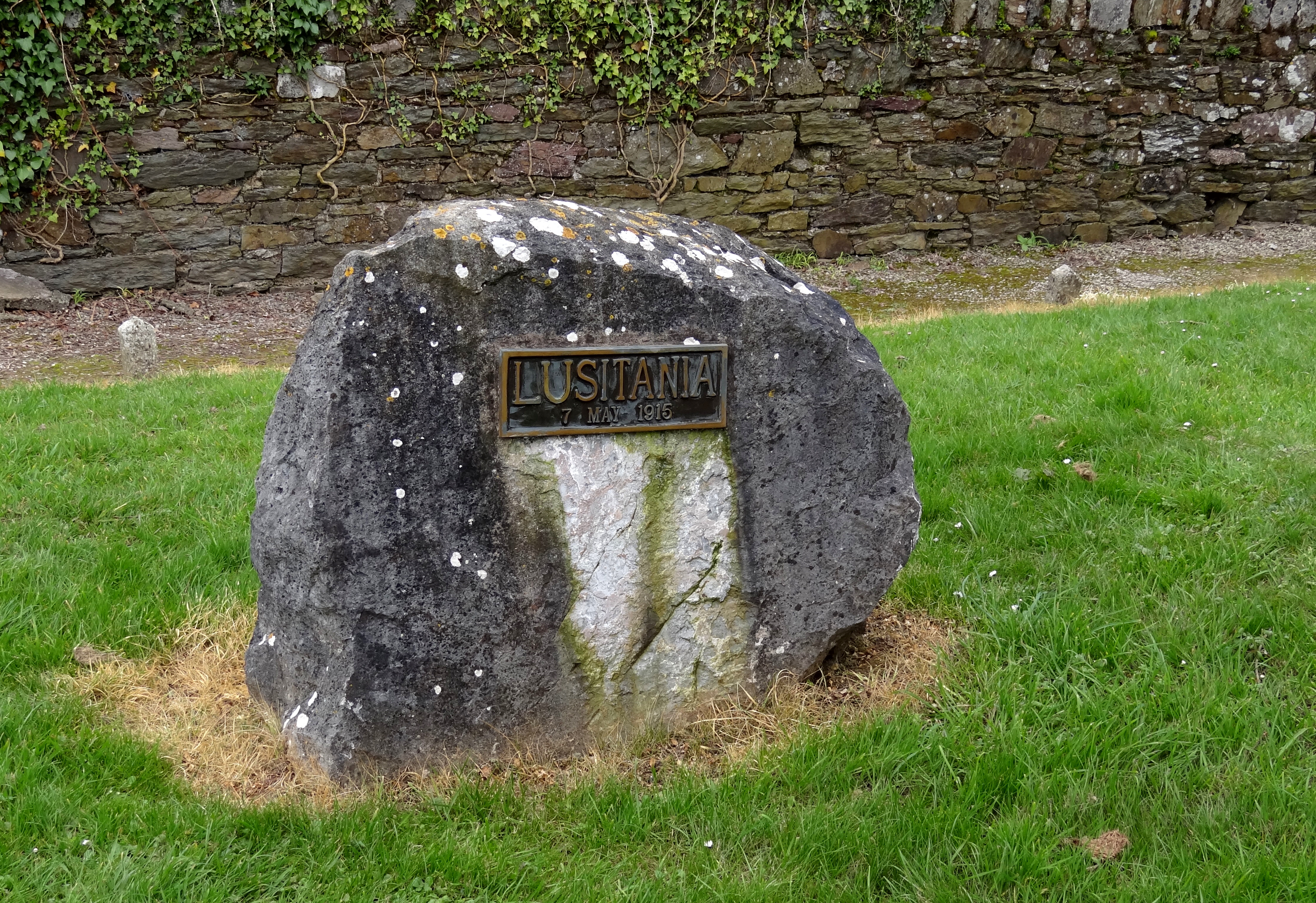
Sinking of RMS Lusitania Memorial

The Old Church Cemetery (also known as Cobh Cemetery) is an ancient cemetery on the outskirts of the town of Cobh, County Cork, Ireland. It contains a significant number of important burials, including three mass graves and individual graves of 193 victims of the passenger ship RMS Lusitania, which was sunk by a German torpedo off the Old Head of Kinsale during the First World War in May 1915 with the loss of more than 1,100 lives. The Commonwealth War Graves Commission register and maintain the graves of 127 identified Commonwealth service personnel (including Lusitania victims) from the same war.

== Notable burials ==
- Captain Thomas Brierley, awarded a medal for his part in rescue of survivors from RMS Lusitania
- Jack Doyle (1913–1978), boxer, singer, Irish Guards soldier and actor
- Robert Forde (1875–1959), Antarctic explorer
- Charles Hallahan (1943–1997), American actor
- Frederick Daniel Parslow (1856–1915), posthumous recipient of the Victoria Cross and first member of the British Mercantile Marine to receive the award
- Charles Wolfe (1791–1823), poet, remembered for "The Burial of Sir John Moore at Corunna"
- Louis Piatt (1876–1884), son of American poets John James Piatt and Sarah Morgan Bryan Piatt; drowned in a boating accident in Cork Harbor
- Dr James Roche Verling (1787–1858), personal physician to Emperor of the French Napoleon Bonaparte during his exile on St. Helena
- Six members of the crew of the British Royal Navy submarine HMS A5 which was destroyed in an accidental explosion at nearby Haulbowline Naval Base in February 1905
