= Daniel Dutton =

American classical composer

Daniel Dutton (born 1959 near Somerset, Kentucky) is a contemporary artist, lyricist, composer, artistic director, and amateur filmmaker, whose work combines visual, musical, and narrative arts. He is best known for his first opera, The Stone Man.

During the 1980s, Dutton showed visual and video installation art at the J. B. Speed Art Museum in Louisville, Kentucky. The Speed Museum commissioned two video works from Dutton: A Day in the Life of the Artist, and Water; an installed environment. Dutton's work was featured as a one-man show in the rotunda of the US Congressional Office Building in 1985.

In 1990, Kentucky Opera premiered Dutton's first opera, The Stone Man, at the Kentucky Center for the Arts. The Stone Man was followed by a four-part cycle of dance operas titled The Secret Commonwealth. These four operas; The Changeling and the Bear, The Road, Love and Time, and The Approach of the Mystery, were staged between 1995 and 2000. The first three operas were filmed and broadcast by Kentucky Educational Television.

Dutton's visual art work is displayed in the corporate art collections of the Brown-Forman Corporation, Louisville, KY and the LeBlond Machino company in Cincinnati. Also, they can be seen at the Berea College Art Museum, Berea, Kentucky, and the 21c Museum, Louisville, KY.

In 2003, Dutton was commissioned to paint a set of 12 scenes from traditional ballads by 21c Museum Hotels, Louisville, Kentucky. The paintings, along with a book and Dutton's recordings of traditional ballads, are complementary aspects of a project titled Ballads of the Barefoot Mind, which were displayed at 21c Museum in the Fall of 2006.

In 2016, Dutton partnered with welder / artist Jesse Rivera to form Rivera-Dutton Sculpture Studio.

Daniel Dutton lives in Somerset, Kentucky. Dutton is one of the last descendants still residing in Somerset of the Dutton family whose property was the site of the Civil War Battle of Dutton Hill (also known as the Battle of Somerset). His studio is less than 1/4 mile from the Battle of Dutton's Hill Monument.
