= Sligo Gaol =

Prison in County Sligo, Ireland

Sligo Gaol or Sligo Prison, (Irish: Príosún Shligigh) is a former prison located in Sligo, County Sligo, Ireland, which was open from 1823 to 1959.

== Construction ==
The prison sits on an 8-acre (32,000 m^{2}) site and was designed to hold 200 inmates in a polygon-shaped building, with the governor's residence situated in the centre of the prison. Construction of the prison began in 1818, and opened in 1823 at a cost of £30,000.

The prison provided its own hospital wing, surgery, dispensary, cookhouse, furnace, clothing store and school.

== General history ==
Gas was introduced to the prison in 1879. This allowed the provision of heating via hot water pipes and earned it the nickname of the Cranmore Hotel.

Male inmates in the prison were forced to undertake "hard labour". This labour included the picking of oakum, rock breaking and wood chopping. Other forms of male labour included shoemaking, tailoring, carpentry, glazing, and painting, whilst female inmates were employed to sew, knit and wash clothes.

During the 20th century the prison was self-sufficient and produced its own food, the surplus of which was sold outside the prison at stalls in Sligo.

== Notable events ==
The final public hanging at Sligo Gaol occurred on 19 August 1861 when 26-year-old Ballymote native Mathew Phibbs, also known as the "Ballymote Slasher", was hanged for murdering William and Fanny Callaghan and a servant girl Anne Mooney in January of the same year. The last person overall to be hanged within the prison was a Mr. Doherty of Carrick-on-Shannon, County Leitrim in 1903, who was convicted of murdering his son.

On 26 June 1920, a party of approximately 100 volunteers from the Irish Republican Army (IRA) undertook a raid on Sligo Gaol with the aim of liberating Frank Carty, the OC of the South Sligo Brigade of the IRA and the newly elected Sinn Féin council of Sligo Town Council.

The IRA members forced open the main gate of the prison and the inner doors. They then forced the nightwatchman to turn over the keys to the cells and they released Carty who was taken away in a waiting motor car.

Throughout the period of the Second World War a number of German spies were held in Sligo Gaol. In September 1946, ten German spies were released from the prison; however, eight of the spies chose to remain in Ireland.

In 1947, Jack Doyle was imprisoned in Sligo Gaol for issuing a cheque which later bounced. He served four months of hard labour.

== Closure ==
During the 1950s, the number of prisoners detained in the prison was low and dropped to less than 15. The prison subsequently closed on 5 June 1956 after the then Minister for Justice, Equality and Law Reform James Everett passed the Sligo Prison Closing Order, 1956 on 25 April 1956 and the prisoners were transferred to Mountjoy Prison.

The closure of the prison was welcomed by councillors of Sligo Corporation as they felt it was a symbol of slavery and the conquest of Ireland.

In 1957, the Irish Department of Justice transferred the ownership of the prison to Sligo County Council. The department, however, retained control of three houses. One of these was retained as a Bridewell in which a prisoner could be held on remand overnight. The last time this Bridewell was used was circa 1959 for a youth remanded on a murder charge. The law was changed to allow a Peace Commissioner to remand a prisoner to Mountjoy, thus the necessity of overnight remand was removed. In 1961, there were plans made to convert the former prison officers' quarters into married quarters for the Gardaí. However, this never materialised and the prison is now used as a storage facility for Sligo County Council with a portion of the site redeveloped as council offices and the headquarters for the Sligo Fire Brigade.

== Notable inmates ==
- Frank Carty
- Michael Collins
- Michael Davitt
- Jack Doyle

== List of governors of Sligo Gaol ==
Name	Years
Mr. J. Beatty	1830–1857
Mr. Walsh	1861–1886
Capt. Loyd	1886–1899
Mr. McArthur	1900–1901
Mr. William J. Reid	1906–1924
Mr. Hipwell	1924–1943
Mr. T. Maher	1943–1947
Mr. J. Kelly	1947–1950
Mr. Moody	1950
Mr. Kelly	1950–1954
Mr. Moody	1954–1956
