= 45th Ohio Infantry Regiment =

- Active: August 19, 1862, to June 12, 1865
- Country: United States
- Allegiance: Union
- Branch: Union Army
- Type: Infantry
- Engagements: Defense of Cincinnati; Battle of Somerset; Knoxville Campaign; Atlanta campaign; Battle of Resaca; Battle of Dallas; Battle of New Hope Church; Battle of Allatoona; Battle of Kennesaw Mountain; Battle of Peachtree Creek; Siege of Atlanta; Battle of Jonesboro; Battle of Lovejoy's Station; Battle of Philadelphia; Battle of Franklin; Battle of Nashville

The 45th Ohio Infantry Regiment was an infantry regiment in the Union Army during the American Civil War.

== Service ==
The 45th Ohio Infantry Regiment was organized at Camp Chase in Columbus, Ohio August 19, 1862, and mustered in for three years service under the command of Colonel Benjamin Piatt Runkle.

The regiment was attached to 3rd Division, Army of Kentucky, Department of the Ohio, September and October 1862. 1st Brigade, 2nd Division, Army of Kentucky, to January 1863. District of Central Kentucky, Department of the Ohio, to June 1863. 2nd Brigade, 1st Division, XXIII Corps, Department of the Ohio, to July 1863. 2nd Brigade, 4th Division, XXIII Corps, to August 1863. 1st Brigade, 4th Division, XXIII Corps, to October 1863. 2nd Brigade, 4th Division, XXIII Corps, to December 1863. 3rd Brigade, 1st Division Cavalry Corps, Department of the Ohio, to April 1864. 2nd Brigade, 2nd Division, XXIII Corps, to June 1864. 1st Brigade, 2nd Division, XXIII Corps, June 1864. 2nd Brigade, 1st Division, IV Corps, Army of the Cumberland, to June 1865.

The 45th Ohio Infantry mustered out of service at Nashville, Tennessee, on June 12, 1865. Recruits were transferred to the 51st Ohio Infantry.

== Detailed service ==
Ordered to Cynthiana, Ky., August 19; then moved to Covington. Ky., and defense of Cincinnati, Ohio, against threatened attack by Kirby Smith. Duty at Lexington, Ky., October 1862 to January 1863. Moved to Danville, Ky., January 25, and duty there until March. Operations in central Kentucky against Cluke's forces February 18-March 5. Regiment mounted at Danville and Brigaded with 7th Ohio Cavalry and 10th Kentucky Cavalry. Operations against Pegram March 22-April 1. Action at Dutton's Hill, near Somerset, March 30. Expedition to Monticello and operations in southeastern Kentucky April 26-May 12. Monticello May 1. Skirmishes about Monticello April 28-May 2. Waitsborough June 6. Monticello and Rocky Gap June 9. West Farm June 9. Operations against Morgan July 2–26 in response to Morgan's Raid, the 45th, along with Wolford's 1st Kentucky Cavalry and the 2nd Ohio Cavalry, left Jamestown, Kentucky, in pursuit of John Hunt Morgan's troops which had crossed the Cumberland River at Burkesville, Kentucky. The Union troops pursued the Rebels from the Cumberland across the Ohio River at Brandenburg, Kentucky, and through Indiana and Ohio. Columbia July 3. Buffington Island, Ohio. July 19. Cheshire and Coal Hill July 20. Operations in eastern Kentucky against Scott's forces July 25-August 6. Burnside's Campaign in eastern Tennessee August 16-October 17. Winter's Gap August 31. Near Sweetwater September 6. Athens, Calhoun, and Charleston September 25. Near Philadelphia October 15. Philadelphia October 20. Jones' Hill October 26–27. Knoxville Campaign November 4-December 23. Marysville November 14. Rockford November 14. Stock Creek November 15. Holston River November 15. Near Knoxville November 16. Skirmishes about Kingston November 16–23. Siege of Knoxville November 17-December 5. Skirmishes at and near Bean's Station December 9–15. Russellsville December 10. Bean's Station December 10–14-15. Rutledge December 16. Blain's Cross Roads December 16–19. Operations about Dandridge January 26–28, 1864. Near Fair Garden January 27. At Cumberland Gap until February 8. At Mt. Sterling, Ky., until April 6, when dismounted. March to Knoxville, then moved to Cleveland, Tenn., April 6-May 5. Atlanta Campaign May to September. Demonstrations on Dalton May 9–13. Battle of Resaca May 14–15. Advance on Dallas May 18–25. Operations on line of Pumpkin Vine Creek and battles about Dallas, New Hope Church, and Allatoona Hills May 25-June 5. Operations about Marietta and against Kennesaw Mountains June 10-July 2. Pine Hill June 11–14. Lost Mountain June 15–17. Muddy Creek June 17. Noyes' Creek June 19. Kolb's Farm June 23. Assault on Kennesaw June 27. Ruff's Station July 4. Chattahoochie River July 5–17. Peachtree Creek July 19–20. Siege of Atlanta July 22-August 25. Flank movement on Jonesboro August 25–30. Battle of Jonesboro August 31-September 1. Lovejoy's Station September 2–6. Operations against Hood in northern Georgia and northern Alabama September 29-November 3. Moved to Pulaski, Tenn., Nashville Campaign, November–December. Columbia, Duck River, November 24–27. Battle of Franklin November 30. Battle of Nashville December 15–16. Pursuit of Hood to the Tennessee River December 17–28. Moved to Huntsville, Ala., and duty there until March 1865. Operations in eastern Tennessee March 15-April 22. At Nashville, Tenn., until June.

== Casualties ==
The regiment lost a total of 339 men during service; 5 officers and 58 enlisted men killed or mortally wounded, 1 officer and 275 enlisted men died of disease.

== Commanders ==
- Colonel Benjamin Piatt Runkle
- Lieutenant Colonel John H. Humphrey - commanded at the Battle of Nashville

== See also ==
- List of Ohio Civil War units
- Ohio in the Civil War
