= McGlusky the Sea Rover =

1935 film directed by Walter Summers

- Trade advertisement
- Directed by: Walter Summers
- Written by: A.G. Hales (novel); Walter Summers
- Produced by: Walter C. Mycroft
- Starring: Jack Doyle; Tamara Desni; Henry Mollison; Cecil Ramage
- Cinematography: Horace Wheddon
- Production company: British International Pictures
- Distributed by: Wardour Films
- Release date: July 1935
- Running time: 58 minutes
- Country: United Kingdom
- Language: English

McGlusky the Sea Rover (U.S. title: Hell's Cargo) is a 1935 British comedy action film directed by Walter Summers and starring Jack Doyle, Tamara Desni and Henry Mollison. It was written by Summers based on a novel by A.G. Hales. It featured the Arklow schooner Mary B Mitchell.

== Plot summary ==
A stowaway becomes mixed up with gunrunners.

== Cast ==
- Jack Doyle as McGlusky
- Tamara Desni as Flame
- Henry Mollison as Captain Mazarin
- Cecil Ramage as Auda
- Frank Cochrane as Abu
- Hugh Miller as Karim
- Jack Short as Govan

== Reception ==
The Monthly Film Bulletin wrote: "A naive tale, whose chief virtues lie in one or two good sea-shots and some quite effective hand-to-hand fighting between Jack Doyle and Henry Mollison. As an actor, Doyle is rarely more than adequate, but Mollison has potentialities which might be better used. Some of the voices come over rather badly, in particular those of Doyle and the small boy, which are full of echoes and sometimes almost incomprehensible. The film would be good children's entertainment were it not for the highly unconventional code of morals, portraying murder, abduction, treachery, and piracy in general as frankly admirable, without any of the counter-balancing grimness of the gangster-film."
