= Piat =

Piat may refer to:

== People ==
=== Given name ===
- Piatus of Tournai (died c. 286), Belgian saint
- Piat Joseph Sauvage (1744–1818), Flemish painter

=== Surname ===
- Jean Piat (1924–2018), French actor and writer
- Maurice Piat (born 1941), Mauritian Roman Catholic cardinal
- Yann Piat (1949–1994), assassinated French politician
- Yves Piat, French writer and filmmaker

== Other uses ==
- PIAT, an anti-tank weapon
- Piat, Cagayan, a municipality in the Philippines
- Peabody Individual Achievement Test

== See also ==
- Piet (disambiguation)
- Piatt, a surname
- Saint-Piat, Eure-et-Loir, France
