= Jack Doyle (boxer) =

Irish boxer and singer (1913–1978)

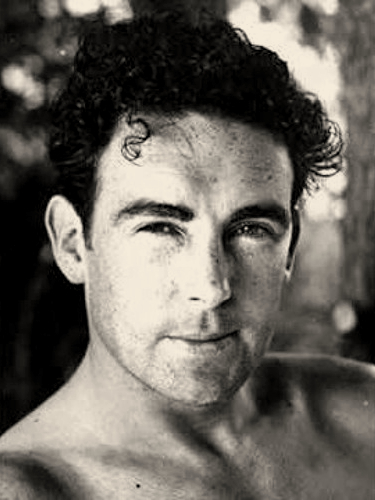
- Doyle, c. the early 1930s
- Born: 31 August 1913: 12 Queen Street, Queenstown, County Cork, Ireland; (Present day Cobh, County Cork)
- Died: 13 December 1978 (aged 65); Paddington, London, England
- Spouses: Judith Allen (m. 1935; div. 1938); Movita Castaneda (m. 1939; div. 1944)
Jack Doyle
Personal information
- Nicknames: The Gorgeous Gael; The King of Clout (Note: In Hiberno-English, to "give someone a clout" means to have struck them); The Body Beautiful
- Height: 1.96 m (6 ft 5 in) (Note: Doyle was promoted and billed at 1.96 m (6 ft 5 in) during the beginning of his career but other sources list him as 1.91 m (6 ft 3 in) or 1.93 m (6 ft 4 in))
- Weight: Heavyweight
Boxing career
- Reach: 201 cm (79 in)
- Stance: Orthodox
Boxing record
- Total fights: 23
- Wins: 17
- Losses: 6

Joseph "Jack" Doyle (31 August 1913 – 13 December 1978), known as "the Gorgeous Gael", was an Irish boxer, professional wrestler, actor, and a tenor. He was born Joseph Doyle but changed his name to Jack when starting his professional career. Considered a boxing prodigy in his youth, Doyle was a contender for the British Boxing Heavyweight Championship. However, his promising boxing career was destroyed by the emergence of his alcoholism, which he would continue to battle with for the rest of his life. In the early to mid-1930s he would attempt to launch both singing and acting careers, but was pulled back into the world of boxing only to be humiliated in a number of first-round knockouts. In the 1950s Doyle turned his hand to professional wrestling, playing up to his former "Gorgeous Gael" moniker with a character inspired by Gorgeous George.

By the 1950s alcoholism had completely overtaken his life and Doyle frequently found himself homeless. Doyle died from cirrhosis of the liver in 1978. Doyle's legacy is a contested one; while many 20th-century sources romanticised Doyle as a tragic hero, many 21st-century sources are highly critical of his relationships with women, which frequently featured domestic violence.

== Early years and start of boxing career ==
Doyle was born into a working-class family in Queenstown (Note: Queenstown was renamed Cobh in 1920) in County Cork, Ireland in 1913. Doyle's father was a sailor in the British navy, but his career was cut short by an injury and he was forced to take work variously as a farm labourer, on local coal boats, and as a quay labourer. Doyle himself left school at 12 years of age and like his father, mostly found work on Cobh's docks.

In Doyle's youth, he came into possession of the book How to Box by Jack Dempsey, the great world heavyweight champion from 1919 to 1926. Doyle would learn the techniques in the book to develop his own boxing skills, and Doyle is reputed to have knocked out a Donkey with a right-hand punch once during a practice session.

After being refused entry into the Irish Army for being underaged, Doyle joined the Irish Guards regiment of the British Army (based in Wales) in September 1930 at the age of 17. It was there that Doyle adopted the first name "Jack" in honour of Jack Dempsey. It was also whilst in Wales that Doyle excelled at boxing and became famed for his strong hooks that won him the British Army Championship. A record of 28 straight victories, 27 by knockout, brought him to the attention of boxing promoter Dan Sullivan. Sullivan "bought out" Doyle from the army for the sum of £28 in February 1932.

Doyle turned professional in 1932 and quickly notched up 10 consecutive victories, all inside two rounds, making him one of the most popular young boxers of the time.

=== Doyle vs Petersen for the British heavyweight championship ===
I fouled Petersen in the first round. I admit that now freely. I was warned that I should be disqualified if I persisted. I did persist. I fouled him again in the second round more than once. I was ordered back to my corner, disqualified and disgraced. Why did I do it? Why did I ignore the warning I got? The plain honest fact of the matter is that I was ill, so ill I should never have been in the ring. I could have refused flatly to go in the ring at all. I put the public first. I did not want to disappoint the tens of thousands who were waiting for the ‘match of the century’, not just the huge crowd who watched, remember, but the peoples of Britain and Ireland. I knew I had only one chance. A knockout in the first two rounds. My strength would not last beyond that. At all costs, I must knock Petersen out in six minutes. I left my corner reckless and desperate, my mind obsessed by just one thought — I must hit and keep on hitting. In this way, I became fighting mad. I did not know what I was doing. I saw red. ‘Hit and keep on hitting’, drummed through my dazed mind and not until I had been forced back to my corner did I realise what I had done

— Jack Doyle, recalling his 1933 fight against Jack Petersen years later in the Sunday Pictorial,

In July 1933, at the age of 19, Doyle was scheduled for a title match for the British Heavyweight title against the reigning champion, Jack Petersen of Wales. By the time of the fight itself, Doyle was not in a condition to fight. Some sources suggested Doyle showed up drunk to the fight, while others suggest he was suffering from a sexually transmitted disease. In either case, a panicked Doyle seemed to come the conclusion he was overmatched in the fight and began repeatedly throwing low blows to his opponent. The referee called for a disqualification in the second round and the 70,000 in attendance for the fight at White City, London promptly began to riot, with supporters of Doyle storming the ring and tossing chairs before carrying Doyle shoulder-high out of the ring.

Doyle knocks out Frank Borrington of Derby, England in 83 seconds at a fight held in the Royal Albert Hall on 22 March 1934

For his actions, Doyle was fined £3,000 and suspended from boxing for six months by the newly established British Boxing Board of Control. Doyle deeply resented the decision. Doyle won a comeback fight against Frank Borrington in 83 seconds on 22 March 1934, but thereafter his boxing career stalled as Doyle fell out with his management as well as continued to butt heads with the Boxing Board of Control.

== Hiatus from boxing ==
=== Music career ===
A restless Doyle soon turned to singing for income. A tenor, Doyle recorded a version of the song "Mother Machree", which sold extremely well (thanks in many parts to his already established fame). Doyle returned to Ireland for a number of sold-out performances at the Theatre Royal, Dublin and Cork Opera House. At this time it was largely the version of the Irish public that Doyle had been the victim of Hibernophobia in England, and that his fight against Petersen had been unjust.

=== Acting career, America ===
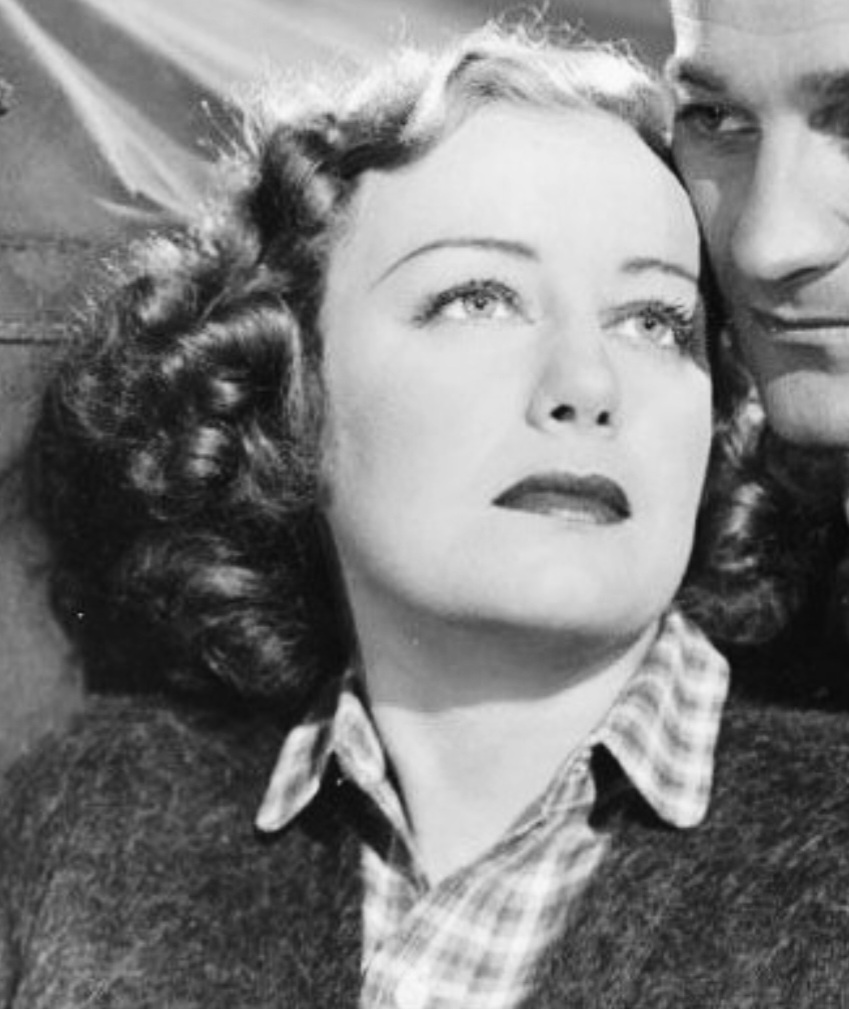
Doyle married American actress Judith Allen in 1935

In 1934 Doyle also continued expanding his ever-growing repartee by turning his hand to acting. Doyle was cast in the British comedy-action swashbuckling film McGlusky the Sea Rover as the titular McGlusky. Although the film bombed at the box office, Doyle travelled to Hollywood, California in the United States to further pursue an acting career. It was while there that Doyle met and married American actress Judith Allen in 1935. Although Doyle and Allen were reported to have a genuine and passionate relationship, Doyle nevertheless continued to pursue and seduce other women continuously. Doyle and Allen would travel first to London, where Doyle performed a concert tour. Doyle and Allen were less well received in conservative Catholic Ireland; Doyle's marriage to an American divorcee was highly controversial and ultimately forced several scheduled gigs at the Theatre Royal to be cancelled. An undeterred Doyle and Allen returned to Hollywood, where Doyle reputedly caroused with the likes of Errol Flynn and Clark Gable, and otherwise lived the life of a socialite.

== Return to boxing, Doyle vs Baer ==
Footage of Doyle and Buddy Baer training for their August 1935 fight. Both men also demonstrate their singing abilities.

Doyle once again resumed his boxing career while in America, this time racking up three victories in short order, although Time magazine dismissed these opponents as Tomato cans. A fourth fight was scheduled for 25 August 1935 in Madison Square Garden, New York City against Buddy Baer. The fight was somewhat of a grudge match: Previous to marrying Doyle, Allen had been the girlfriend of Baer's older brother Max Baer.

The fight itself was a disaster: Doyle lost in the very first round to Baer by technical knockout, which Time Magazine suggested was the result of a deliberate low blow from Baer. The referee had no power to stop the fight or disqualify Baur as New York State Athletic Commission did not allow referees to do that at the time. Allen heightened the melodrama from ringside as she reportedly screamed, fainted, revived and tore at her hair over the result.

Doyle and Allen would star alongside each other in the 1937 American film Navy Spy, however, their relationship remained fraught and by 1938 the pair had brought divorcee proceedings against each other. Navy Spy bombed at the box office. Part of the breakup between Doyle and Allen was over Doyle's affair with Delphine Dodge, her fifteen-year-old daughter and her sister-in-law. Delphine was the heiress to the Dodge motor company. On 4 September 1937, the New York Times announced in an article that Delphine Dodge (12 years Doyle's senior) was to divorce her husband with an eye to marrying Doyle as soon as his divorce to Allen was complete. This prompted the Dodge family to intervene; they reportedly paid Doyle $10,000 (Note: Some sources state $10,000, other sources state $5,000 directly, and another $5,000 indirectly to pay off gambling debts) to leave the Dodge women while also threatened to have a hitman kill him if he broke the deal.

== End of boxing career ==
Doyle left for the UK and continued to box, only to once again become mired in controversy as he was disqualified during a bout against Alf Robinson after Doyle struck Robinson while he sat on the bottom rope. Doyle fought twice more, gaining two victories including one over King Levinsky in a match that went to the judges' scorecards. However, during a match against Eddie Phillips on September 27, 1938, Doyle swung wildly with a haymaker in the first round and missed entirely before barrelling out of the ring and into the press seats, where he was promptly counted out by the referee. Doyle was widely seen as having taken a (literal) dive in order to avoid exposing his lack of fitness.

Nevertheless, Doyle remained a potent draw in boxing and mainstream celebrity, particularly amongst the Irish and Irish diaspora. A return match on July 10, 1939 between Doyle and Philips drew as many as 250,000 attendees to White City, London, to witness Doyle knock down Philips twice, only for Philips to counter an overly aggressive Doyle and knock him out.

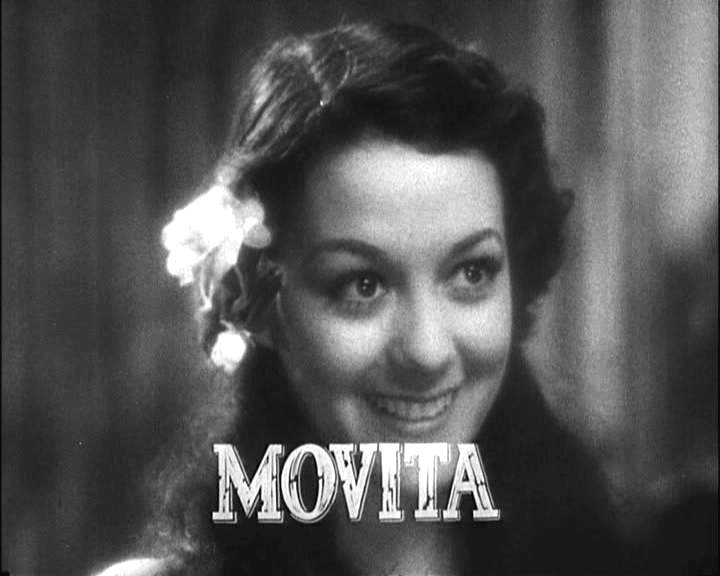
Movita in a trailer for Mutiny on the Bounty

Doyle's drawing power had been supplemented by his January 1939 marriage in Baja California, Mexico to actress Movita Castaneda, recent co-star to Clark Gable in Mutiny on the Bounty, which once-again fortified his persona as a playboy and international celebrity.

The final match of note of Doyle's boxing career came on 11 June 1943, when he faced novice Irish boxer and farmer Chris Cole in Dublin's Dalymount Park. 16,000 attendees witnessed the 24-year-old Cole effectively end Doyle's (then a 29-year-old) fighting days when Cole floored Doyle in early (Note: Sources differ how early; one source states 2 minutes 30 into the first round, while others states 1 minute 30 seconds in the first round) into the first round.

== Post-boxing ==
Doyle and Movita renewed their vows in 1943 at Dublin's Westland Row Church. Soon the pair toured both sides of the Irish Sea, selling out music halls and opera houses singing. Amongst their setlist was their version of the recently released song "South of the Border".

The marriage between Doyle and Movita was not a happy one; on multiple nights it's alleged that Doyle would become drunk and hit Movita after performances. On Christmas Day 1944 Movita caught Doyle kissing another woman in a taxi outside their home. Movita confronted Doyle, and in return Doyle dragged Movita by her hair into the house before punching the pregnant Movita, knocking her out and causing her to suffer a miscarriage. Shortly thereafter Movita left and divorced Doyle. Later in life, she would marry actor Marlon Brando.

Quickly after Movita left, Doyle continued to spiral out of control; He was imprisoned in Mountjoy Jail, Dublin for knocking out a Garda Detective in a Ranelagh pub. In 1947 Doyle was again imprisoned, this time in Sligo Gaol for issuing a cheque which later bounced. He served four months of hard labour.

=== Professional wrestling ===
"Two Ton Tony Galento faces against Doyle in a professional wrestling match in Harringay, London

In the early 1950s, Doyle entered into the world of professional wrestling. In February 1951, Doyle and former boxing rival Eddie Philips had a professional wrestling "rematch" while on 8 June 1951, Doyle faced “Two Ton” Tony Galento in a professional wrestling match at Tolka Park, Dublin in front of 22,500 attendees. During the match, Doyle heavily played into his "Gorgeous Gael" moniker by coming out dressed in lace, imitating the effeminate character made famous by Gorgeous George. On 5 March 1953, Joyle wrestled "Tiger" Joe Robinson while on 10 August 1953 Doyle faced his friend Michael "Butty" Sugrue in a professional wrestling in Killorglin, County Kerry as part of entertainment for the "King Puck" fair.

== Life in London ==
For approximately the last 30 years of his life, Doyle lived in London with an Irish woman, Nancy Keogh. It is alleged that Doyle would be violent with Keogh on occasion. Keogh left Doyle approximately 16 or 15 months before his death, at which point Doyle became homeless. The last months of Doyle's life are described as Doyle wandering shoeless from pub to pub, doorway to doorway, his health deteriorating due to syphilis.

== Death ==
Doyle died in 1978, age 65, at St. Mary's Hospital in Paddington, from cirrhosis of the liver. At the time it seemed he would be buried in a pauper's grave in London. However, when news of his death reached Ireland a number of members of the Cork Ex-Boxer's Association decided to act. In conjunction with Cobh undertaker Paddy Barry they brought Jack's remains home. Large crowds lined the streets of Cobh as the coffin led by a lone piper and topped with Jack's trademark - a red carnation - was brought on its last journey. He was buried in the Old Church Cemetery, an ancient cemetery on the outskirts of the town of Cobh, County Cork, Ireland, and his grave is visited by thousands of people every year.

Shortly before his death, he was interviewed by a journalist who asked him if he had any regrets about not spending his money more wisely. "None at all," he said, "twas never a generous man went to hell."

== Legacy ==
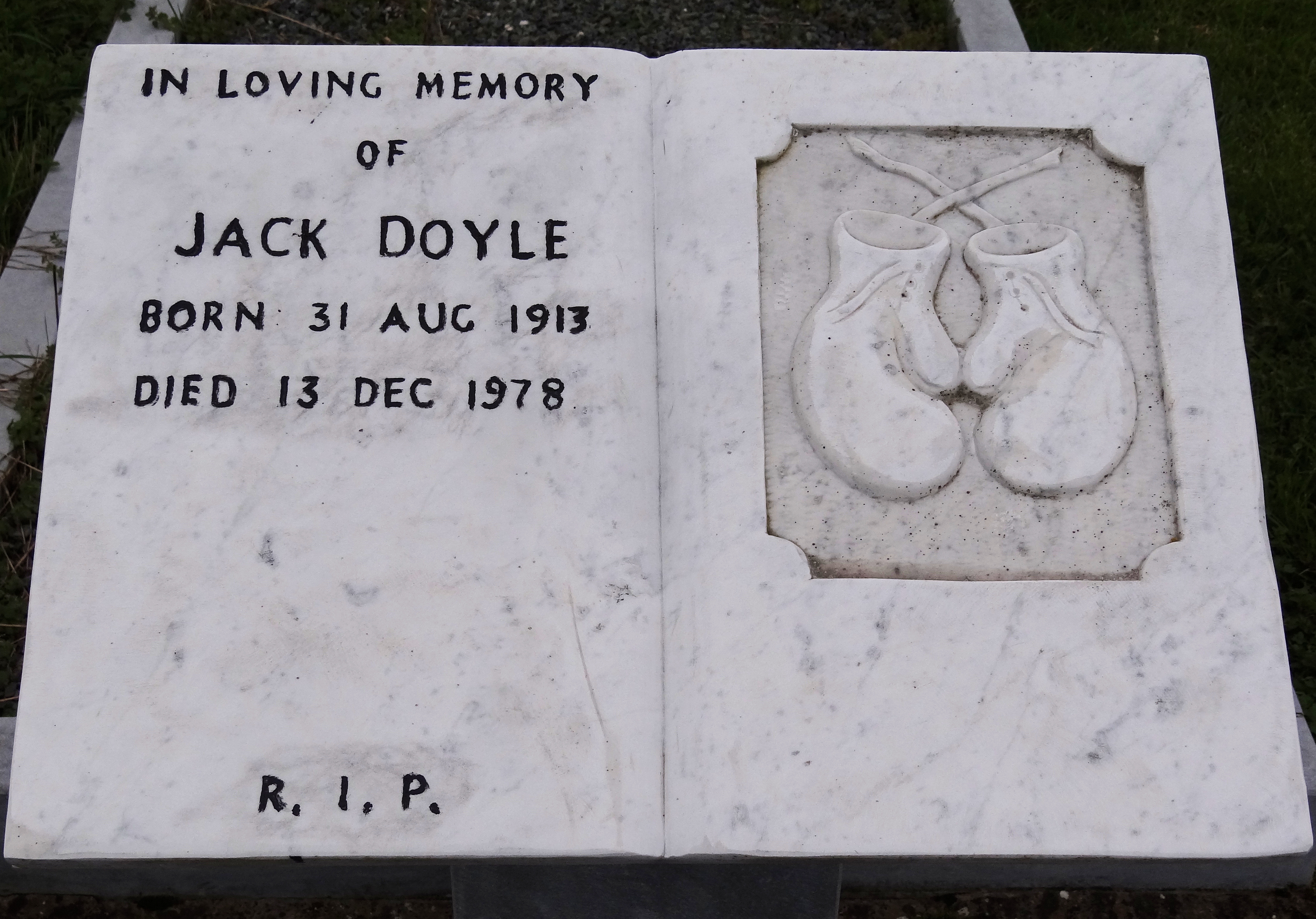
Doyle's grave

Doyle was the subject of a radio documentary by RTÉ Radio 1 in 1979. RTÉ again featured Jack Doyle in their series True Lives in a programme called Jack Doyle, a Legend Lost in September 2007. A book to accompany the programme called Jack Doyle: The Gorgeous Gael was released in late 2007.

The popular Irish song The Contender written by Jimmy MacCarthy around 1983 was a song about Jack Doyle, and has been performed by many musicians including Finbar Wright, Christy Moore, Tommy Fleming and Paul McGrath (footballer)

In the late 2010s Cork County Council had a number of debates over whether or not to build a statue honouring Doyle in his hometown of Cobh. Councillors against the move cited the allegations of domestic violence against Doyle, in particular against his second wife Movita Castaneda. Councillors in favour of the statue claimed that the allegations of domestic violence are "unsubstantiated". (Note: Multiple reliable, secondary sources state as fact that Doyle engaged in domestic violence, and are cited in this article)

== Filmography ==
Year	Title	Role	Notes
1935	McGlusky the Sea Rover	McGlusky	
1937	Navy Spy	Lt. Don Carrington	
1954	The Belles of St Trinian's	Assistant trainer	
1957	The Counterfeit Plan	Racketeer	(final film role)
