= Eddie Phillips (boxer) =

English boxer

- Born: 9 November 1911; Bow, London, England
- Died: 2 March 1995 (aged 83); London, England
- Known for: English boxer and actor

Eddie Phillips (9 November 1911 in Bow, London – 2 March 1995 in London, England) was an English boxer. He was the youngest of five children. At the age of sixteen he became a charabanc driver taking visitors on day outings. He started boxing at the age of eighteen. In 1934, he married Marion Oakley. They had three children, Edward born in 1935, Derek in 1937 and Stephanie born in 1940. Stephanie had two boys Marcus & Gregory Clifford. Gregory had 4 children. Bradley Clifford, Ryan Clifford, Kyle Clifford & Sian Clifford.

He was called up for the Royal Air Force in 1940 and reached the rank of corporal. Due to illness he left in 1943.

During his career as a boxer he fought 42 bouts, winning 32 fights with seventeen K.Os, six losses, three draws and 1 no contest (32-6-3). He won the British Light Heavyweight championship belt in 1935.

In the early 1940s he made two films, My Learned Friend starring Will Hay in 1943 and Champagne Charlie in 1944. He was a publican of The Lord Tredegar and then the Vicar of Wakefield both of which were situated in the East End.

== Career ==
Eddie Phillips made his debut in December 1929, the exact date is not known. He fought to a draw with Reg Palmer at the Casino Club in Rochester, Kent.

Date	Opponent	Result	Location
December, 1929	Reg Palmer (0-0-0)	Draw	Casino Club, Rochester
17 November 1930	Roy Webb (2-5-0)	W-TKO	Holborn Stadium Club, Holborn
3 May 1931	Ted Mason (30-10-8)	W-PTS	The Ring, Blackfriars Road, Southwark
21 May 1931	Tony Arpino (3-3-0)	W-KO	Royal Albert Hall, Kensington
15 November 1931	Lucien Decleau (14-7-6)	W-RTD	The Ring, Blackfriars Road, Southwark
14 December 1931	Dave Mintor (0-0-0)	W-TKO	Holborn Stadium Club, Holborn
21 December 1931	Jack Stratton (6-11-1)	W-PTS	Holborn Stadium Club, Holborn
11 January 1932	Jack Marshall (9-23-1)	W-RTD	Holborn Stadium Club, Holborn
18 January 1932	Jack Newitt (3-3-0)	W-KO	Holborn Stadium Club, Holborn
1 February 1932	Leo Bandias (10-8-1)	W-TKO	Holborn Stadium, Holborn
15 February 1932	Billy Allick (9-6-1)	W-TKO	Drill Hall, Crystal Palace
21 February 1932	"Battling" Bill Hudson (7-10-1)	W-TKO	The Ring, Blackfriars Road, Southwark
21 March 1932	Bob Carvill (32-16-2)	W-PTS	Holborn Stadium Club, Holborn
17 April 1932	Bill Partridge (2-1-1)	L-KO	Bow Drill Hall, Bow
27 April 1932	Lode Wuestenraedt (40-35-11)	W-PTS	Royal Albert Hall, Kensington
12 July 1932	Eddie Steele (21-6-2)	W-PTS	Wimbledon Stadium, Wimbledon
29 September 1932	Jack O'Malley (35-10-3)	W-TKO	Royal Albert Hall, Kensington
13 March 1933	Len Harvey (110-9-8)	Draw	Royal Albert Hall, Kensington
13 April 1933	Piet van Gool (11-19-3)	W-KO	Royal Albert Hall, Kensington
12 June 1933	Len Harvey (110-10-9)	L-PTS	Olympia, Kensington
1 February 1934	Tommy Farr (48-18-16)	W-PTS	Holborn Stadium Club, Holborn
26 February 1934	Eddie Peirce (12-2-3)	NC	White City Stadium, Hull
12 April 1934	Ben Foord (14-3-2)	L-KO	Royal Albert Hall, Kensington
13 June 1934	Tommy Farr (49-21-16)	W-DQ	Wandsworth Stadium, Wandsworth
10 December 1934	Alf Luxton (15-8-0)	W-KO	Alexandra Theatre, Birmingham
4 February 1935	Tommy Farr (56-23-17)	W-PTS	Pavilion, Mountain Ash
6 May 1935	Charlie Bundy (22-20-5)	Draw	White City, Cardiff
25 June 1935	Eddie Wenstob (7-1-2)	W-DQ	Wembley Stadium, Wembley
8 October 1935	Eddie Wenstob (7-2-2)	W-PTS	Wembley Arena, Wembley
26 October 1935	Len Harvey (116-11-10)	L-PTS	Wyndham Hall, Plymouth
28 February 1936	Ernie Simmons (16-14-5)	W-PTS	Millbay Rinkeries, Plymouth
22 June 1936	Ernie Simmons (17-15-5)	W-PTS	Holborn Stadium, Holborn
5 October 1936	Lode Wuestenraedt (43-45-15)	W-KO	Drill Hall, Wolverhampton
9 November 1936	Jim Wilde (19-9-2)	W-PTS	Empire Pool, Wembley
27 April 1937	Jock McAvoy (109-9-1)	L-KO	Empire Pool, Wembley
9 August 1937	Alex Bell (21-14-0)	W-TKO	Hackney Wick Greyhound Stadium, Hackney
3 November 1937	Arno Koelblin (31-10-7)	W-DQ	Harringay Arena, Harringay
21 June 1938	Ben Foord (35-12-4)	W-KO	Harringay Arena, Harringay
27 September 1938	Jack Doyle (16-3-0)	W-KO	Harringay Arena, Harringay
1 December 1938	Len Harvey (119-13-10)	L-DQ	Harringay Arena, Harringay
10 July 1939	Jack Doyle (16-4-0)	W-KO	White City Stadium, White City
25 September 1945	Olle Tandberg (6-3-1)	W-PTS	Royal Albert Hall, Kensington

- May 1931, Tony Arpino, Olympia London.
- February 1932, Leo Bandias, Holborn Stadium, London.
- February 1932, Billy Alleck, Crystal Palace, London.
- March 1932, Bob Carvill, Holborn Stadium, London.
- April 1932, Bill Partridge, Bow, London.
- September 1932, Jack O'Malley, Royal Albert Hall, London.
- March 1933, Len Harvey, Royal Albert Hall, London.
- June 1933, Len Harvey, Olympia, Kensington.
- February 1934, Tommy Farr, Holborn Stadium, London.
- February 1934, Eddie Peirce, White City Stadium, Yorkshire.
- April 1934, Ben Foored, Royal Albert Hall, London.
- June 1934, Tommy Farr, Wandsworth Stadium, London.
- February 1935, Tommy Farr, Mountain Ash, Wales.
- May 1935, Charlie Bundy, White City, Cardiff, Wales.
- June 1935, Eddie Wenstob, Wembley Stadium, London.
- October 1935, Eddie Wenstob, Wembley Stadium, London.
- October 1935, Len Harvey, Millbay Rinkeries, Devon.
- November 1936, Jim Wilde, Empire Pool, Wembley.
- April 1937, Jock McAvoy, Empire Pool, Wembley.
- August 1937, Alex Bell, Devonshire Club, Hackney.
- November 1937, Arno Kölblin, Harringay Arena, Harringay.
- June 1938, Ben Foorde, Harringay Arena, Harringay.
- September 1938, Jack Doyle, Harringay Arena, Harringay.
- December 1938, Len Harvey, Harringay Arena, Harringay.
- September 1939, Jack Doyle, White City Stadium, London.
- September 1945, Olle Tandberg, Royal Albert Hall, London.

For a while he did some wrestling after his boxing career. He also did an exhibition fight with Joe Lewis. He died in 1995, leaving his wife, children, and grandchildren, and great grandchildren.
