= Battle of Somerset =

Battle of the American Civil War

Coordinates: 37°6.900′N 84°35.783′W

- Part of the American Civil War
Date	March 30, 1863
Location	Somerset, Kentucky
Result	Union victory

Belligerents
United States (Union)	(Confederate States of America) CSA (Confederacy)

Commanders and leaders
Quincy A. Gillmore	John Pegram

Strength
1,250	1,550

Casualties and losses
10 killed 25 wounded	290 total

The Battle of Somerset (or Dutton's Hill) was fought on March 30, 1863, during the American Civil War. General John Pegram led a Confederate cavalry raid into central Kentucky which was defeated by Union forces under General Quincy A. Gillmore.

== Background ==
In late March 1863, Confederate Brigadier General John Pegram led a 9-day cavalry foray into Kentucky in the vicinity of Lexington for the purpose of gathering beef cattle to feed the Army of Tennessee. Pegram led approximately 1,550 cavalry supported by a three piece battery of artillery across the Cumberland River at Stigall's Ferry on March 22. The Confederate column consisted of the 1st Louisiana Cavalry, 1st Georgia Cavalry, 1st and 2nd Tennessee Cavalry, 16th Battalion Tennessee Cavalry (less two companies left behind in Tennessee), 1st Florida Cavalry (3 mounted companies), and Huwald's Tennessee Battery of mule-drawn mountain howitzers. By making an orderly march through Somerset, the local populace was led to believe that Pegram was leading the forefront of a Confederate invasion of central Kentucky. Rumors flew as to the actual strength of Pegram's command.

In response to the Confederate raid, Union Brigadier General Quincy A. Gillmore sought permission from Department of the Ohio commander, Major General Ambrose E. Burnside, to move against Pegram. Although Gillmore had gained a reputation in artillery and engineering service, Burnside nevertheless authorized Gillmore to lead a mixed force of cavalry and mounted infantry. Gillmore organized a strike force including elements of the 1st Kentucky Cavalry, 7th Ohio Cavalry, 44th Ohio (Mounted) Infantry, 45th Ohio (Mounted) Infantry, and six pieces of artillery including two 3-inch Ordnance Rifles and four Mountain Howitzers, manned by the 26th Independent Battery Indiana Light Artillery and Law's Artillery, respectively.

While foraging for cattle, Pegram's cavalry encountered Yankees under the command of Brigadier General Samuel P. Carter on March 28 at Hickman's Bridge near the future site of Camp Nelson, established one month later. Then, narrowly evading the closely following 44th and 45th Ohio Mounted Infantry regiments, they continued to rustle cattle until they had rounded up about 750 animals. Braxton Bragg was relying on beef to keep the Army of Tennessee supplied with nourishing food. Pegram's cavalry had herded 537 of the cattle across the Cumberland River when their luck ran out.

== Battle ==
On March 30, 1863, about 1 1/2 miles from Somerset in Pulaski County, Kentucky, Pegram's cavalry was overtaken by a Union force of 1,250 men under the command of Brigadier General Quincy A. Gillmore. Gillmore drove Pegram's skirmishers up Dutton's Hill where the Confederates made a stand. Making no headway at first, Union artillery was brought forward. The 45th Ohio Infantry made a successful charge against the hill forcing the Confederates to retreat. Pegram was defeated.

== Results ==
Pegram retreated south of the Cumberland River leaving behind horses and much of his confiscated cattle. Confederate casualties numbered at least 10 killed and many dozens captured, while Union forces lost around 10 killed and 25 wounded.

The defeat brought a significant amount of tension between Pegram and his subordinates.

Gillmore's first independent field command was a success, though he continued to express interest in artillery and coastal service. General-in-Chief Henry W. Halleck transferred Gillmore to South Carolina for a proposed campaign against Charleston, South Carolina.

== See also ==
- Battle of Dutton's Hill Monument
