= Abram S. Piatt =

American politician (1821–1908)

Abram Sanders Piatt
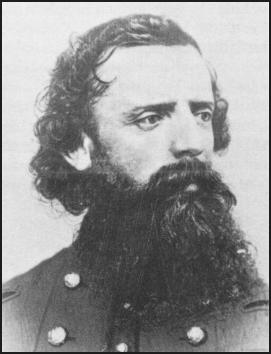
- Born: May 2, 1821; Cincinnati, Ohio
- Died: March 23, 1908 (aged 86); Logan County, Ohio
- Burial place: Mac-a-cheek Cemetery, West Liberty, Ohio
- Relatives: Col. Donn Piatt (brother); Col. Benjamin Piatt Runkle (nephew)
- Military career
- Allegiance: United States of America; Union
- Branch: United States Army; Union Army
- Service years: 1861–1863
- Rank: Brigadier General
- Commands: 13th Ohio Infantry Regiment; 34th Ohio Infantry Regiment; 1st Brigade, 3rd Division, III Corps
- Conflicts: American Civil War: Battle of Kanawha Gap; Battle of Princeton Court House; Second Battle of Bull Run; Battle of Fredericksburg
- Other work: politician

Abram (or Abraham) Sanders Piatt (May 2, 1821 – March 23, 1908) was a wealthy farmer, publisher, poet, politician, and soldier from southern Ohio who served as a general in the Union Army during the American Civil War. He organized the only zouave regiment from Ohio and later led a brigade in the Army of the Potomac. In 1864, he and his brother constructed the Piatt Castles, two sprawling chateaux near West Liberty, Ohio, that are still used today for weddings, meetings, retreats, and other social gatherings.

== Early life and career ==
Piatt was born in Cincinnati, Ohio, to Benjamin McCullough Piatt and Elizabeth Barnett. His father was a Federal Circuit Judge and entrepreneur engaged in land development and flat boat trade in Cincinnati, who moved his family to Logan County in 1828.

On November 10, 1840, Piatt married his Kentucky-born first cousin Hannah Anna Piatt at the home of his grandfather, Federal Hall, Boone County, Kentucky. They eventually would have eight children. He attended what is now Xavier University before deciding to return home to the Mac-a-cheek Valley in Logan County, where he became a prosperous farmer. In 1846, Piatt studied law briefly and began editing and publishing the local Mac-a-cheek Press newspaper.

His brother Donn Piatt became a staff officer in the Union Army during the Civil War, and after the war edited and published "The Capital," a weekly newspaper in Washington, D.C. that fiercely criticized the administration of President Grant.

== Civil War ==
Piatt's wife Anna died April 10, 1861, in Macochee, Ohio, as the American Civil War was beginning. A grief-stricken Abram became the colonel of the three-months' 13th Ohio Infantry Regiment on April 30, leaving his children in the care of a servant and his other family members. Later that summer, he raised a new three-years' regiment, the 34th Ohio Infantry, and clothed and fed them for a month and six days with his own gold. The regiment became known as Piatt's Zouaves for their early war red pants and zouave attire. Piatt also raised and equipped the 54th Ohio Infantry, which went into the field under the command of Thomas Kilby Smith.

On September 1, 1861, Piatt and the 34th moved to Camp Dennison near Cincinnati. The regiment then was ordered to western Virginia later in the month. It received its baptism of fire from a Virginia Confederate regiment at the Battle of Kanawha Gap, on September 25. During the fall and winter months, Piatt's Zouaves were on picket and scouting duty, and engaged in occasional skirmishing with guerrillas. In May 1862, the regiment had a sharp fight with the Confederate forces under Humphrey Marshall near Princeton.

In 1862, Piatt was promoted to brigadier general and assigned command of the 1st Brigade, 1st Division, Headquarters, Mountain Department. Later serving in the Army of the Potomac, he saw action at the Second Battle of Bull Run that August.

During the Maryland Campaign in the fall of 1862, Piatt and his regiment were detached from the Army of the Potomac and served in the Defenses of Washington, thereby missing the Battle of Antietam on September 17. He badly injured his back when his horse stumbled and brought both of them to the ground during the Battle of Fredericksburg on December 12, 1862. As a result of his injury, he resigned from the army on February 17, 1863.

== Postbellum career ==
Piatt returned to his home in Logan County and soon remarried and resumed farming. He and his brother both prospered and they built a pair of castles near West Liberty, Ohio.

His brother Donn Piatt was a member of the Ohio House of Representatives, 1865–66, and was the Washington correspondent of the Cincinnati Commercial from 1868 to 1871. He established and edited, with George Alfred Townsend, the Capital at Washington, D.C., 1871–72, and was its editor-in-chief, 1873–80. He was arrested in 1876 by order of President Ulysses S. Grant on the charge of inciting the people through his paper to rebellion, insurrection and riot. He retired to his estate Mac-a-cheek in 1880 and devoted himself to literary work. He edited Belford's Magazine from 1888 to 1889.

Abram S. Piatt was a candidate for Ohio Governor in 1879 on the Greenback ticket.

Abram S. Piatt died in 1908 in Monroe Township from cancer and is buried in the nearby Piatt Cemetery.

== See also ==
- List of American Civil War generals (Union)
- Ohio in the American Civil War
