= Sarah Morgan Bryan Piatt =

American poet (1836–1919)

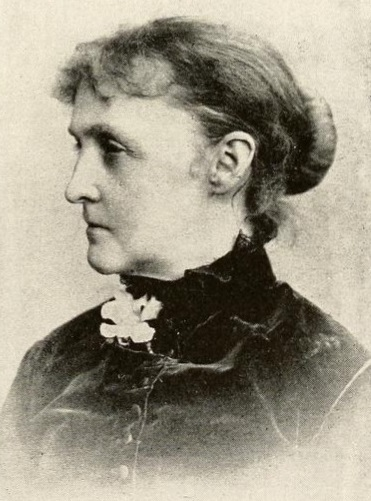
- "A woman of the century"
- Born: Sarah Morgan Bryan; August 11, 1836; Lexington, Kentucky, U.S.
- Died: December 22, 1919 (aged 83); Caldwell, New Jersey, U.S.
- Resting place: Spring Grove Cemetery, Cincinnati, Ohio, U.S.
- Education: Henry Female College
- Occupation: Poet
- Partner: John James Piatt (m. 1861; died 1917)
- Children: 7
- Writing career
- Language: English
- Notable work: A Woman's Poems

Sarah Morgan Bryan Piatt (August 11, 1836 – December 22, 1919), also known as Sallie M. Bryan, was an American poet. Her career began in the mid-1850s and lasted into the early twentieth century. She published hundreds of poems in nationally circulated newspapers, magazines, and anthologies as well as in eighteen volumes of poems, two of which she co-authored with her husband, the poet John James Piatt (also known as "J.J."). Although Piatt is not well known today, during her lifetime her work was widely read and reviewed in the U.S. and Europe.

== Early years and education ==
Sarah Morgan Bryan was born near Lexington, Kentucky, on August 11, 1836, to Talbot Nelson Bryan and Mary Spiers Bryan. She was the eldest of three children. Her mother was related to the Stocktons, Simpsons, and other early Kentucky settlers. Her paternal grandfather, Morgan Bryan, was one of the pioneer settlers of that state and the early settlement Bryan's Station, as well as a relation by marriage of Daniel Boone, whom the Bryans accompanied from North Carolina into Kentucky. Both of Piatt's parents were descended from slaveholding families.

When Piatt was three, the family moved near Versailles, Kentucky. When she was eight, her mother died. The loss had a profound impact on her life and outlook, as evident in her poetry. After her mother's death, Piatt lived on various Kentucky plantations with relatives, accompanied by her mother's nurse, an enslaved African-American woman. For a time, she lived with her grandmother, and then later went to live with her father at the home of his new wife. Eventually, her father placed her and a younger sister in the care of their aunt, Mrs. Annie Boone, who lived in New Castle, Kentucky.

In New Castle, Piatt attended Henry Female College, graduating in 1854. She became an avid reader, and was especially fond of Percy Bysshe Shelley, Samuel Taylor Coleridge, Lord Byron, Thomas Moore, Walter Scott, Felicia Hemans, and Robert Browning. While a student, she began publishing her poetry in the local newspaper. During the early part of her career, she published under her maiden name, Sarah (or Sallie) M. Bryan, or her initials, S.M.B.

== Career ==
When George D. Prentice, writer, poet, and editor of the Louisville Journal, encountered her poetry, he immediately recognized her talent and skill. In 1855 he wrote to her: "I now say emphatically to you again . . . that, if you are entirely true to yourself, and if your life be spared, you will, in the maturity of your powers, be the first poet of your sex in the United States. I say this not as what I think, but what I know." Prentice became Piatt's mentor and advocate, publishing many of her poems in his newspaper. She also began sending her work to The New York Ledger, a popular and significant periodical with a national circulation.

On June 18, 1861, she married aspiring poet John James Piatt (also known as "J.J."), who at the time was working as a secretary for Prentice. The couple relocated to Washington, D.C., where J.J. had accepted a clerk position in the U.S. Treasury. During this period they published The Nests at Washington (1864), a collection featuring a section of poems by each of them. The work was J.J.'s second book (following the 1861 Poems of Two Friends with William Dean Howells) and Sarah's first. Throughout their relationship, J.J. managed Sarah's career, including submitting her poems to periodicals and arranging for the publication of her work in book form.

In July 1867, they moved to Ohio, where J.J. worked for Cincinnati newspapers. They made their home on a part of the old estate of William Henry Harrison in North Bend, Ohio, a few miles south of Cincinnati, on the Ohio River. The family shuttled back and forth to Washington, D.C. on a few occasions, such as when J.J. worked for the postal service. From 1870 to 1876, Sarah and the children joined J.J. in Washington, D.C. in the winters, where he served as librarian of the United States House of Representatives. During this time, Sarah's poems appeared in the Washington, D.C. weekly newspaper The Capital, founded by Donn Piatt, her cousin by marriage.

Her first independent collection of poetry, A Woman's Poems, appeared anonymously in 1871. This came to be her best known work, made famous by Bayard Taylor's book, The Echo Club. The volume was followed by several more, including A Voyage to the Fortunate Isles (Boston, 1874), That New World (Boston, 1876), Poems in Company with Children (Boston, 1877), and Dramatic Persons and Moods (Boston, 1878). During this period, she also contributed to many prominent American magazines, such as The Atlantic Monthly, Scribner's Monthly, The Century Magazine, Harper's Magazine, and St. Nicholas Magazine.

In 1882, the Piatts moved to Queenstown (now Cobh), Ireland, as J.J. had accepted the position of Consul of the U.S. to Cork, a job he held for eleven years. While abroad, Sarah wrote many poems inspired by her time in Ireland. She continued publishing poetry collections, including An Irish Garland (Edinburgh, 1884), Selected Poems (London, 1885), In Primrose Time: a New Irish Garland (London, 1886), The Witch in the Glass, and Other Poems (London, 1889), and An Irish Wild-Flower (London, 1891), all of which were issued simultaneously in the U.S. Sarah and J.J. also published another volume featuring both of their work, The Children Out-of-Doors: a Book of Verses (Edinburgh, 1884).

== Personal life ==
Piatt was the mother of Marian (b 1862); Victor (1864); Donn (1867); Fred (1869); Guy (1871); Louis (1875); and Cecil (1878) as well as at least one infant child and possibly others who died in infancy. Victor died in a tragic fireworks accident in 1874, and Louis drowned in a boating accident in 1884 while the Piatts were living in Ireland.

After J.J.'s death in 1917, Piatt lived with her son Cecil in Caldwell, New Jersey. She died of pneumonia on December 22, 1919. Sarah and J.J. are buried at Spring Grove Cemetery, Cincinnati, Ohio.

== Themes and reception ==
According to scholar Paula Bennett, “the bulk of Sarah Piatt’s poetry can be divided into five thematic categories: poems on the Civil War and its aftermath, North and South; poems of gender (romance and marriage); poems about motherhood and to/on children; poems inspired by the Piatt’s stay in Ireland (1882-1893) and travels on the continent; and poems on set cultural themes: religion, dead heroes, moral or political allegories, art and artists.” Bennett has suggested that Piatt's writing on motherhood and children was so prolific that she produced “what is probably the largest single body of poetry [on the topic] in the English language.” More recently, Piatt scholar Elizabeth Renker has identified her as a major poet of Reconstruction sociopolitics.

During Sarah Piatt's lifetime, her work was mostly praised by critics. According to Emerson Venable's The Poets of Ohio (1909): “Mrs. Piatt is a woman of original and exceptional genius—a poet whose name shines in American literature.” Yet some found her poetry too subtle. In the 1889 Encyclopedia Britannica entry about the poet, J.M. Stoddart observed that “her poems are thoughtful and deep in sentiment, but sometimes obscure.” However, literary scholar Karen L. Kilcup has tracked the tendency of critics to praise “her womanliness while critiquing her obscurity and difficulty,” often remaining “oblivious to her depth.”

Despite the popularity Piatt enjoyed during her career, her work fell into obscurity after her death in 1919. The new aesthetics ushered in and prized by modernist poets devalued popular poets of prior generations, including many women poets. Scholars began to rediscover Piatt's work in the mid-1990s, and two selected editions of her poems appeared in 1999 and 2001. Over the past twenty years, a growing body of scholarship has brought her to wider public attention as a contender for entry in the literary canon.

== Selected works ==
- A Woman's Poems. 1871
- A Voyage to the Fortunate Isles. 1874
- That New World, & Other Poems. 1877
- Poems in Company with Children. 1877
- Dramatic Persons and Moods: with Other New Poems. 1880
- A Book about Baby and Other Poems in Company with Children. 1882
- An Irish Garland. 1885
- In Primrose Time: a New Irish Garland. 1886
- Mrs. Piatt's Select Poems: a Voyage to the Fortunate Isles and Other Poems. 1886
- Child's-World Ballads: Three Little Emigrants, a Romance of Cork Harbour, 1884, etc. 1887
- The Witch in the Glass, etc. 1888
- An Irish Wild-Flower, etc. 1891
- An Enchanted Castle, and Other Poems: Pictures, Portraits and People in Ireland. 1893
- Poems. 1894
- Complete Poems. 1894
- That New World: The Selected Poems of Sarah Piatt (1861-1911). Ed. Larry R. Michaels. Toledo, OH: Bihl House Publishing, 1999.
- Palace-Burner: The Selected Poetry of Sarah Piatt. Ed. Paula Bernat Bennett. Urbana: University of Illinois Press, 2001.

=== Collaborations ===
With her husband:

- The Nests at Washington, and Other Poems. 1864
- The Children Out-of-Doors: a Book of Verses. 1885
