= Piatt Castles =

Historic houses in Logan County, Ohio

- Abram S. Piatt House and Donn S. Piatt House
- U.S. National Register of Historic Places
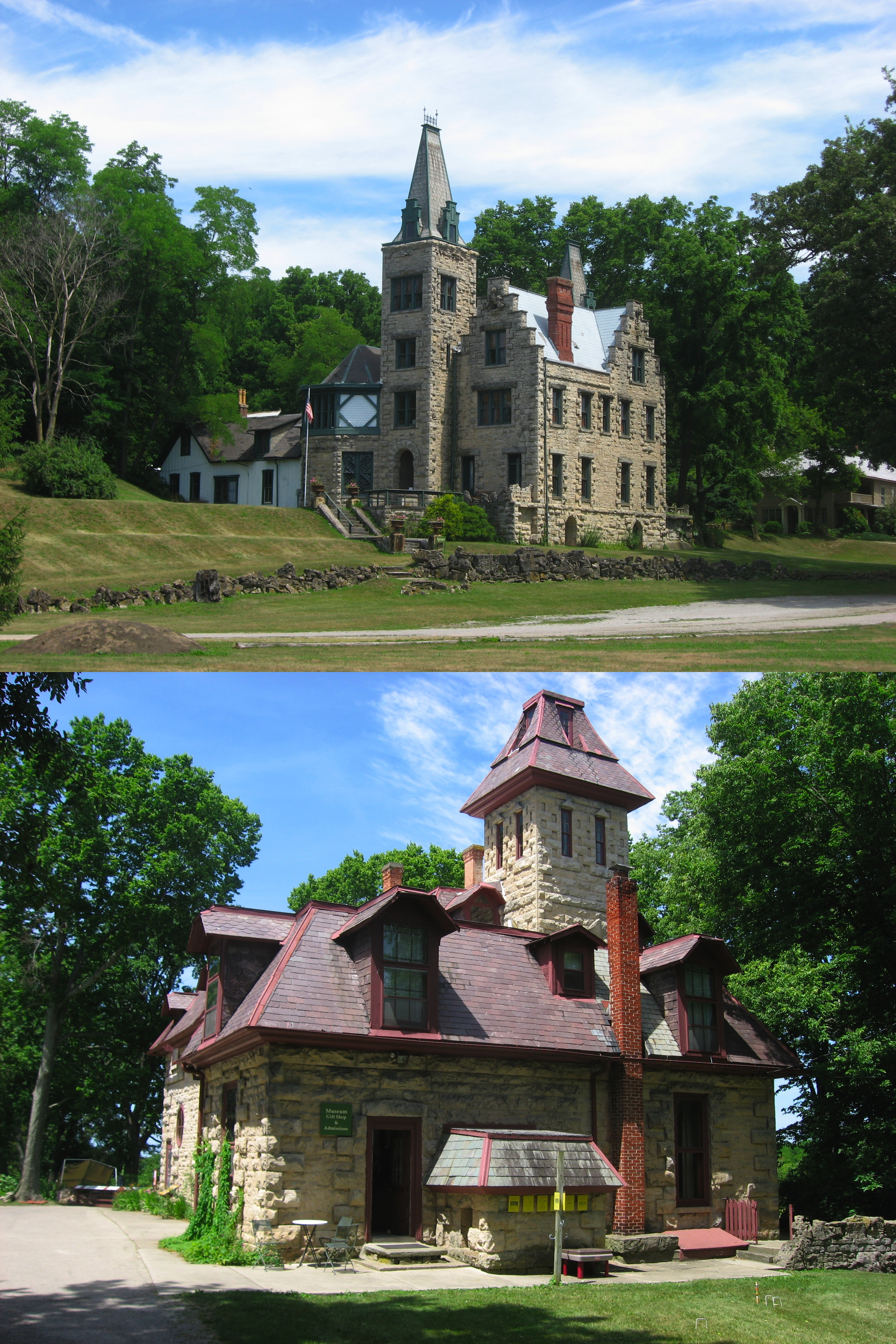
- Mac-O-Chee and Mac-A-Cheek castles

- Location within Ohio Location within the United States
- Interactive map showing the location of Piatt Castles
- Location: 10051 Township Road 47 (Mac-A-Cheek); 2223 OH 287 (Mac-o-Chee), Monroe Township, Logan County, Ohio
- Coordinates: 40.251032°N 83.726808°W (Mac-A-Cheek), 40.258263°N 83.716850°W (Mac-O-Chee)
- Area: 4 acres (1.6 ha)
- Built: 1864
- Architect: William McCoy Piatt; Kenton G. Haver
- Architectural style: Gothic, Flemish
- NRHP reference No.: 82003604
- Added to NRHP: May 3, 1982

The Piatt Castles are two historic houses near West Liberty in Logan County, Ohio. The houses were built by brothers Donn and Abram S. Piatt in the 1860s and 1870s, designed in a Gothic style. The houses are located 1 mi (1.6 km) and 1.75 mi (2.82 km) east of West Liberty. In 1982, the castles were listed on the National Register of Historic Places.

The houses were both operated as historic house museums, both still owned by the Piatt family, from 1912 to 2019. Mac-O-Chee, built by Donn Piatt, was sold in October of that year to local residents, to support the continued restoration of the Mac-A-Cheek estate. Mac-A-Cheek remains open to public tours.

== Piatt family ==
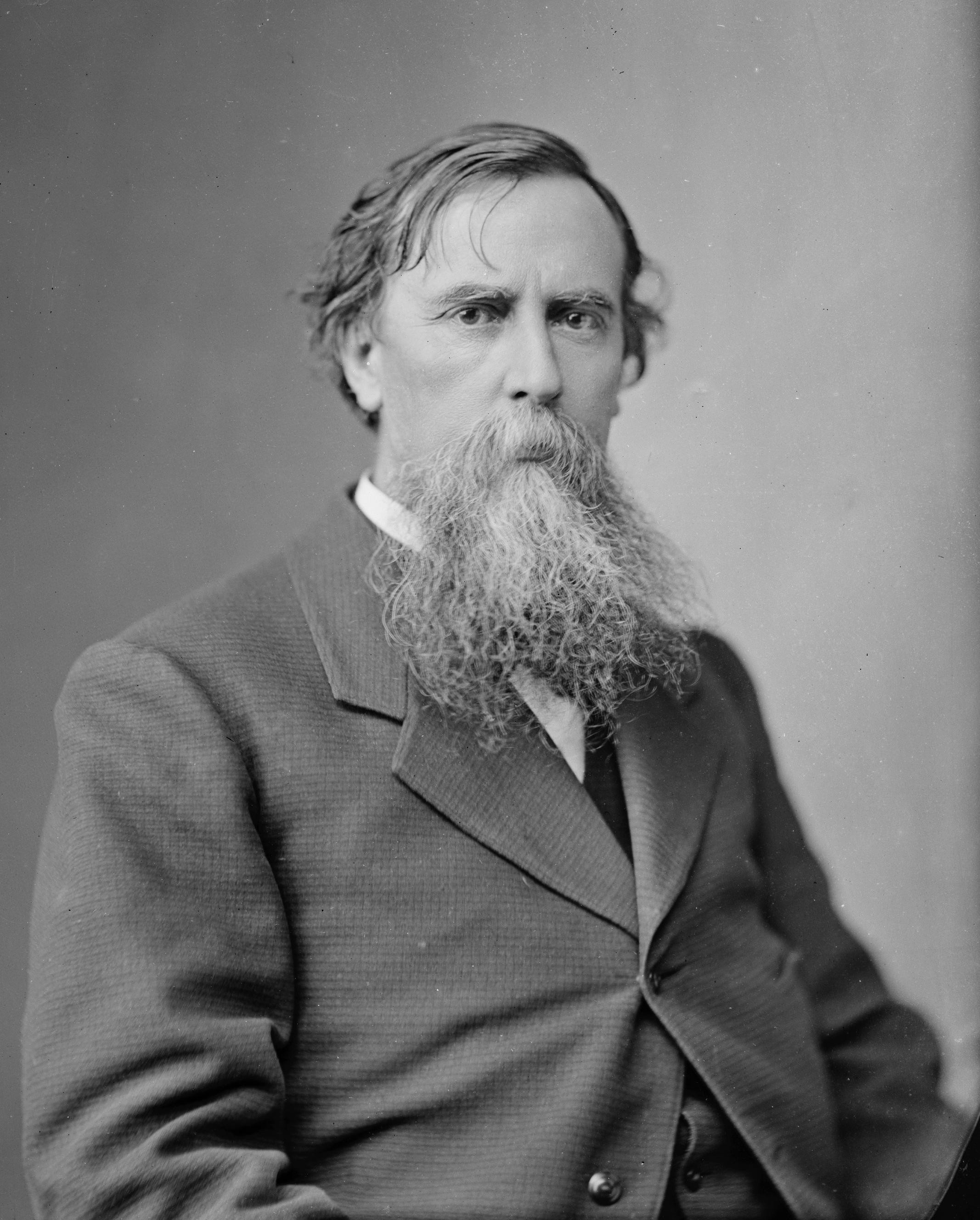
Donn Piatt

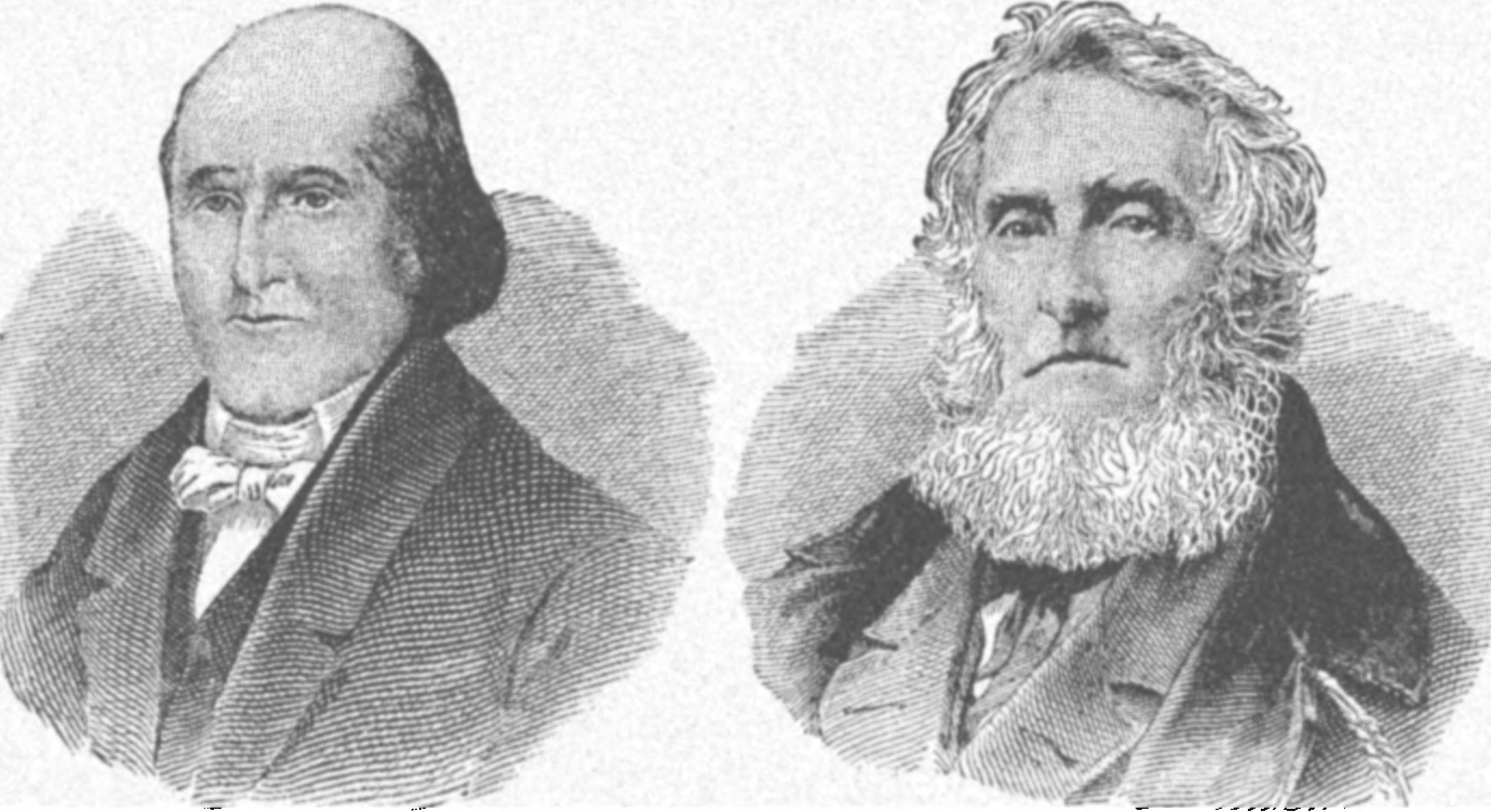
Jacob and Benjamin Piatt

The Piatt family descended from France as French Huguenots who wished to escape religious persecution in a Catholic nation. Upon moving to the United States, the family took root in the colony of New Jersey, where the grandfather of Abram and Donn, Jacob Piatt, offered support to the country in the American Revolutionary War. As reward for his deeds, the newly founded government gave Jacob land in Kentucky, where he built his home.

While Jacob was a farmer and his son Benjamin was a lawyer, the family was also involved in flat boat trading up and down the Ohio and Mississippi Rivers as well as real estate. By 1828, Benjamin had moved his family to Logan County, Ohio. It was here that he built a log cabin for his family. At the time of their move to Logan County, Donn was 9 years old and Abram was 7.

== Castles ==
Mac-O-Chee (the home built by Donn, and designed by John L. Smithmeyer) and Mac-A-Cheek (built by Abram) were begun in 1864. Mac-A-Cheek was completed in 1871, and Mac-O-Chee was completed in 1879. The homes were built only about 3/4 of mile apart from each other. Abram's home was built slightly smaller, but is more secluded and set away from the road. Donn's home is larger and sits closer to the road. Both homes have three stories and towers, boast painted ceilings, and have intricate woodwork. An 1880 county history speaks of Mac-O-Chee existing in a state of "almost baronial splendor". The two sat close to the Shawnee village of Mackachack, where Simon Kenton was forced to run the gauntlet after being captured by the Indians.

== Sale of Mac-O-Chee ==
It was announced on July 26, 2019, that the Piatt Family would auction off Mac-O-Chee. The family cited renovation and maintenance costs of maintaining both properties for their decision. On October 19, 2019, Mac-O-Chee Castle, along with its farmhouse and land, was sold at auction to brothers Ryan and Jason Cole of West Liberty, Ohio for $561,000 ($510,000 with closing costs). The Coles also bought most of the estate's antique items, large and small, for approximately $30,000. The Piatt family plans to restore their remaining castle, Mac-A-Cheek, by using funds from the auction.

== Public tours ==
Tours began in 1912 at Mac-A-Cheek four years after the death of Abram. When William McCoy Piatt (the fourth son of Abram) inherited the home, he had already amassed a large collection of artifacts and objects of interest. After commissioning a custom cabinet to display his collection, William opened his home to visitors who wished to view his curiosity cabinet. Thus the family entered into the tourist business, though it was a minor industry compared to the farm and grist mill located on the property.

Touring continued with the family living in the home until 1985, when the family moved out of their home. Tours of Mac-A-Cheek are still offered to the public. The Piatt family still owns and manages the museum at Mac-A-Cheek, a popular site for weddings, receptions and other events.

== Bibliography ==
- Bridges, Peter. "Donn Piatt: Diplomat and Gadfly." In American Diplomacy at http://www.unc.edu/depts/diplomat/item/2007/0103/life/bridges_piatt.html.
- Riley, James Whitcomb. "Donn Piatt of Mac-o-chee." Complete Poetical Works of James Whitcomb Riley (Bloomington, Ind.: Indiana University Press, 1993), 321.
