= Donn Piatt =

American journalist, military officer, and public official (1819–1891)

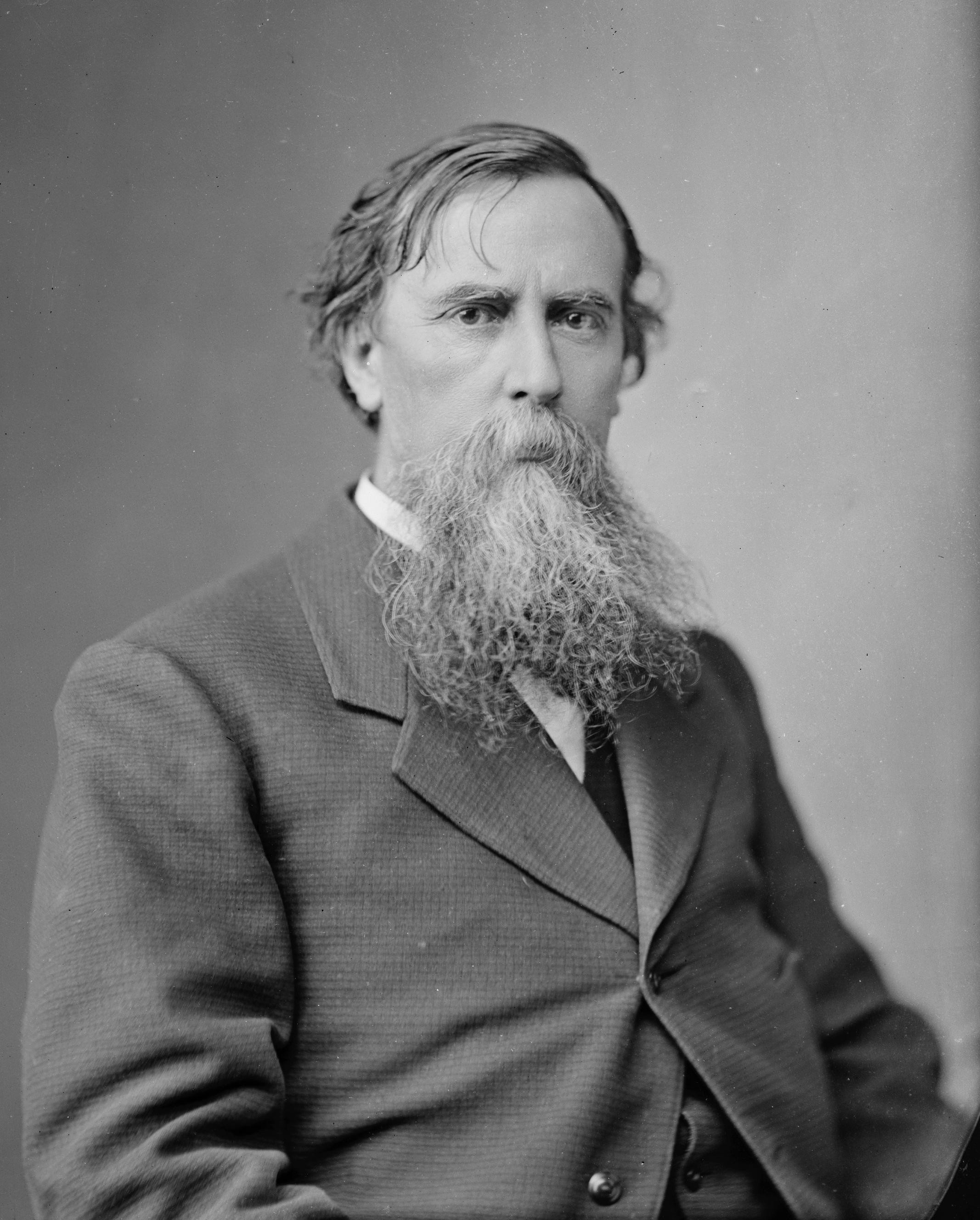
- Donn Piatt between 1865 and 1880
- Born: June 29, 1819; Cincinnati, Ohio, U.S.
- Died: November 12, 1891 (aged 72); Mac-o-chee, near West Liberty, Ohio, U.S.
- Relatives: Abram S. Piatt

Donn Piatt (June 29, 1819 – November 12, 1891) was an American journalist, military officer, and public official. Born in Cincinnati, Piatt attended schools in Ohio and began contributing to newspapers as a young man. He started his career as a lawyer and was briefly a judge in the early 1850s. He represented the United States as a diplomat in Paris for about a year starting in 1854.

Piatt served as an officer in the Union Army in the American Civil War from 1861 to 1864. After the war, he held a seat in the Ohio House of Representatives for a single term. He then moved east—first to New York, then to Washington, D.C. He began a journalism career in Washington, founding a newspaper and contributing to others. After retiring from journalism around 1880, Piatt returned to Ohio and wrote works of fiction and plays.

== Early life and education ==
Donn Piatt was born on June 29, 1819, in Cincinnati, Ohio, to Elizabeth (Barnett) and Benjamin M. Piatt, a judge. In 1827, the family moved to a large home outside West Liberty, Ohio, called Mac-o-chee, later the site of one of the Piatt Castles. Donn attended schools in Urbana, Ohio, and an institution called the Athenaeum in Cincinnati, now Xavier University. He studied at the Athenaeum for three years. According to his biographer Charles Grant Miller, Piatt had to leave the Athenaeum after throwing his mathematics teacher out of a window.

By age 20, Piatt had published articles in The Catholic Telegraph and the Ohio Statesman. His father was a staunch Whig but Donn grew to favor the Democratic Party in that campaign. He started his first newspaper, the Democratic Club, during the 1840 United States presidential election. The first issue was printed in West Liberty on May 21, 1840.

== Legal work and diplomacy (1840s–1850s) ==
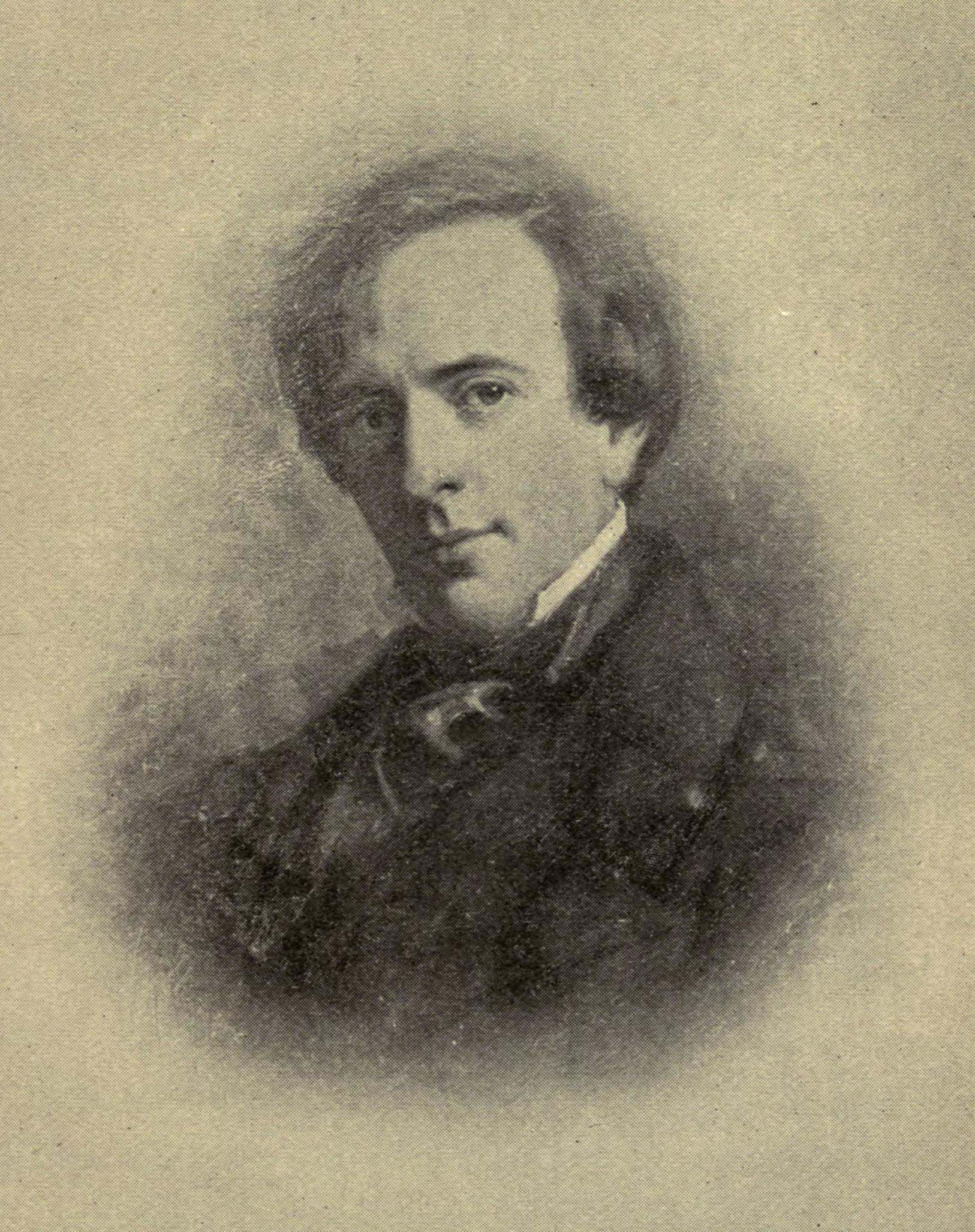
Piatt in 1854

After a visit to Washington, D.C., in late 1841, Piatt began practicing law in Cincinnati in a firm with his brother Wykoff and brother-in-law N. C. Read. He became a judge of the court of common pleas in Hamilton County, Ohio, on April 3, 1852. Soon after, on April 5, 1854, President Franklin Pierce commissioned him the secretary of the American legation in Paris. Piatt returned to the United States in fall 1855.

In the late 1850s, Piatt edited and contributed to several newspapers including the small Mac-a-cheek Press, which Donn founded with his brother Abram S. Piatt. Donn's cousin John James Piatt, a poet, became the Press's editor sometime in 1858 or 1859. Donn contributed to several other papers including the Louisville Journal (later The Courier-Journal) and Ohio State Journal (later The Columbus Citizen-Journal) around this time.

== Civil War (1861–1864) ==
Piatt was an officer of the Union Army in the American Civil War. On April 30, 1861, he was commissioned a captain of the 13th Ohio Infantry Regiment and became a major on November 4, 1862. He was promoted to lieutenant colonel on January 1, 1863, becoming the chief of staff to Robert C. Schenck. At some point around June 1863, when Schenck was away from his post attending to business in Boston, Piatt ordered William Birney to recruit a brigade only of enslaved people. Piatt had unsuccessfully tried to convince Schenck to give this order, which Schenck refused to do, so Piatt waited until Schenck left him in charge to issue the order himself. President Abraham Lincoln was going to cashier Piatt for this decision but decided not to after Edwin Stanton and Salmon P. Chase intervened. Schenck resigned from the army in December 1863, after which Piatt asked to be relieved from duty. Piatt formally resigned from the army in July 1864.

== Politics and journalism (1865–1880) ==
In fall 1865, Piatt was elected to the Ohio House of Representatives as a Republican. He left after one term.

About 1868, Piatt moved east—first to New York and then to Washington, D.C. He was initially the Washington correspondent for the Cincinnati Commercial (later the Cincinnati Commercial Tribune) and then, with George Alfred Townsend, founded a new paper called the Capital. Its first issue appeared on March 12, 1871. Piatt edited Capital from 1871 to 1880. Beginning in May 1871, he edited a humor section of The Galaxy titled "Club Room", taking over from Mark Twain. In his contributions to Capital, Piatt made fun of clergy including John Philip Newman, critiqued politicians including Zachariah Chandler, mocked John Bingham, and alleged that Vinnie Ream was hired to make statues for her personal beauty and not her artistic talent. He reserved special ire for nouveaux riches in Washington society.

== Writing and retirement (1880–1891) ==
Piatt retired from active work in the newspaper business after a doctor told him his wife's health would improve in a country retreat. The two went back to Mac-o-chee. In retirement, he wrote three plays in rapid succession: Lost and Won; A Hunt for an Heiress; and Jane Shore, a King's Love. Only Jane Shore was produced; Clara Morris starred in an unsuccessful New York production. He wrote another play after Jane Shore flopped, about the Burr conspiracy, but it was not published in his lifetime. In February 1887, he published a collection of newspaper articles about Civil War figures as Memories of the Men Who Saved the Union. In Memories, Piatt wrote negatively about Ulysses S. Grant and William Tecumseh Sherman.

Apparently from Mac-o-chee, Piatt began editing Belford's Monthly, a magazine "embracing a liberal political policy in addition to literary features of the highest excellence", in summer 1887. Its first issue was released in June 1888. A novel titled The Reverend Melancthon Poundex, based on a short story he published in Capital as "The Minister's Wooing", was published posthumously in 1893.

Shortly after the first inauguration of Grover Cleveland in 1885, a post office was established at Mac-o-chee with Piatt as the postmaster.

== Personal life ==
On a visit to Mac-o-chee, James Whitcomb Riley wrote a poem about Piatt. In 1881, Piatt built one of the Piatt Castles at the Mac-o-chee site.

Piatt married Louise Kirby in 1847, after which the two went back to Mac-o-chee for three years. Louise died in 1864 and Piatt married her sister Ella in July 1866. He died on November 12, 1891, at Mac-o-chee, after catching a "severe cold" en route back from a meeting of the Literary Club of Cincinnati.

== Publications ==
- An Infamous Record (unpublished, 1870s)
- Life in the Lobby: A Comedy in Five Acts (Washington, D.C., 1875)
- Memories of the Men Who Saved the Union (1887)
- The Lone Grave of the Shenandoah and Other Tales (Chicago, 1888)
- Poems and Plays (Cincinnati, 1893)
- The Reverend Melancthon Poundex: A Novel (Chicago, 1893)
- General George H. Thomas: A Critical Biography (Cincinnati, 1893)
- Sunday Meditations (Cincinnati, 1893)

== Works cited ==
- Hedges, Samuel Bernard (October 1893). "Colonel Donn Piatt". Catholic World. 58 (343): 99–110. hdl:2027/hvd.32044105216105. ISSN 1042-3494.
- Miller, Charles Grant (1893). Donn Piatt: His Work and His Ways. Cincinnati, Ohio: Robert Clarke & Co. OCLC 697721641.
