= 13th Ohio Infantry Regiment =

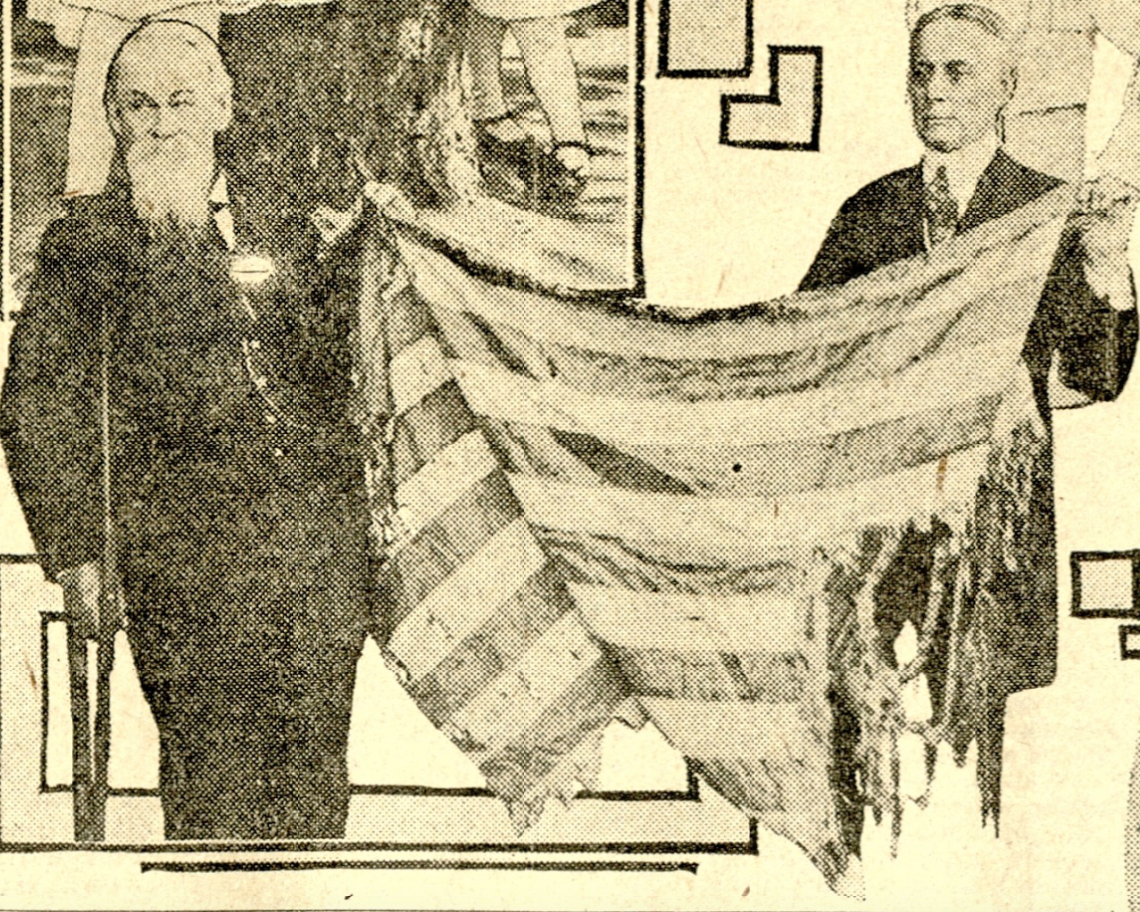
- National color of the regiment
- Active: April 20, 1861, to August 25, 1861 (3 months); June 22, 1861, to December 5, 1865 (3 years)
- Country: United States
- Allegiance: Union
- Branch: Union Army
- Type: Infantry
- Engagements: Battle of Carnifex Ferry; Battle of Shiloh; Siege of Corinth; Battle of Perryville; Battle of Stones River; Tullahoma Campaign; Battle of Chickamauga; Siege of Chattanooga; Battle of Missionary Ridge; Atlanta campaign; Battle of Resaca; Battle of Kennesaw Mountain; Battle of Peachtree Creek; Siege of Atlanta; Battle of Jonesboro; Battle of Lovejoy's Station; Second Battle of Franklin; Battle of Nashville

The 13th Ohio Infantry Regiment was an infantry regiment in the Union Army during the American Civil War.

== Service ==
=== Three-months regiment ===
The 13th Ohio Infantry Regiment organized at Columbus, Ohio, on April 20 – May 7, 1861, under Colonel Abram S. Piatt in response to President Lincoln's call for 75,000 volunteers. The regiment moved to Camp Dennison near Cincinnati, Ohio, on May 9 and remained on duty there until June 22 when it was reorganized as a three-years regiment. Men who enlisted in the three-month regiment were mustered out August 14–25, 1861.

=== Three-years regiment ===
The 13th Ohio Infantry was reorganized at Camp Dennison and mustered in for three years service on June 22, 1861, under the command of Colonel William Sooy Smith.

The regiment was attached to 2nd Brigade, Army of Occupation, Western Virginia, to September 1861. Bonham's Brigade, District of the Kanawha, Western Virginia, to October 1861. 1st Brigade, Kanawha Division Western Virginia, to November 1861. 17th Brigade, Army of the Ohio, to December 1861. 17th Brigade, 3rd Division, Army of the Ohio, to April 1862. 14th Brigade, 5th Division, Army of the Ohio, to September 1862. 14th Brigade, 5th Division, II Corps, Army of the Ohio, to November 1862. 2nd Brigade, 3rd Division, Left Wing, XIV Corps, Army of the Cumberland, to January 1863. 2nd Brigade, 3rd Division, XXI Corps, Army of the Cumberland, to October 1863. 3rd Brigade, 3rd Division, IV Corps, to June 1865. 2nd Brigade, 3rd Division, IV Corps, to August 1865. Central District of Texas to October 1865. Sub-District of San Antonio, Central District of Texas, to December 1865.

After the three-year enlistments expired in June 1864, recruits and veterans who reenlisted were consolidated into a battalion of four companies. The 13th Ohio Infantry mustered out of service at San Antonio, Texas, on December 5, 1865.

== Detailed service ==
Left Ohio for Parkersburg, W. Va., June 30, 1861. West Virginia Campaign July 6–17, 1861. Moved to Oakland, W. Va., July 14. Expedition to Greenland Gap July 15–16. Duty at Sutton until September. Battle of Carnifex Ferry September 10. At Gauley Bridge until November. Operations in the Kanawha Valley and New River Region October 19 – November 16. Gauley Bridge November 3. Pursuit of Floyd November 12–16. Cotton Hill and Laurel Creek November 12. McCoy's Mills November 15. Ordered to Louisville, Ky., and camp at Jeffersonville, Ind., until December 11. Near Elizabethtown, Ky., until December 26, and at Bacon Creek until February 10, 1862. Advance on Bowling Green, Ky., and Nashville, Tenn., February 10–25. Occupation of Nashville until March 17. March to Savannah, Tenn., March 17 – April 6. Battle of Shiloh April 6–7. Advance on and siege of Corinth, Miss., April 29 – May 30. Buell's Campaign in northern Alabama and middle Tennessee June to August. March to Louisville, Ky., in pursuit of Bragg August 21 – September 26. Pursuit of Bragg into Kentucky October 1–16. Battle of Perryville October 8 (reserve). March to Nashville, Tenn., October 16 – November 7. Duty there until December 26. Action at Rural Hill November 18. Advance on Murfreesboro, Tenn., December 26–30. Battle of Stones River December 30–31, 1862 and January 1–3, 1863. Duty at Murfreesboro until June. Stones River Ford, McMinnville, June 4. Tullahoma Campaign June 22 – July 7. Liberty Gap June 22–24. Occupation of middle Tennessee until August 16. Passage of Cumberland Mountains and Tennessee River, and Chickamauga Campaign August 16 – September 22. Battle of Chickamauga, September 19–20. Missionary Ridge September 22. Siege of Chattanooga September 24 – November 23. Chattanooga-Ringgold Campaign November 23–27. Orchard Knob November 23. Missionary Ridge November 24–25. Pursuit to Graysville November 26–27. March to relief of Knoxville, Tenn., November 28 – December 3. Operations in eastern Tennessee until April 1864. Atlanta Campaign May 1 – September 8. Demonstrations on Rocky Faced Ridge and Dalton, Ga., May 8–13. Battle of Resaca May 14–15. Adairsville May 17. Near Kingston May 18–19. Near Cassville May 19. Advance on Dallas May 22–25. Operations on Pumpkin Vine Creek and battles about Dallas, New Hope Church and Allatoona Hills May 25 – June 5. Pickett's Mills May 27. Operations about Marietta and against Kennesaw Mountain June 10 – July 2. Pine Hill June 10–14. Lost Mountain June 15–17. Non-veterans mustered out June 21, 1864. Veterans and recruits consolidated to a battalion. Assault on Kennesaw June 27. Ruff's Station, Smyrna Camp Ground, July 4. Chattahoochie River July 5–17. Peachtree Creek July 19–20. Siege of Atlanta July 22 – August 25. Flank movement on Jonesboro August 25–30. Battle of Jonesboro August 31 – September 1. Lovejoy's Station September 2–6. Operations against Hood in northern Georgia and northern Alabama September 29 – November 3. Nashville Campaign November–December. Columbia, Duck River, November 24–27. Battle of Franklin November 30. Battle of Nashville December 15–16. Pursuit of Hood to the Tennessee River December 17–28. Moved to Huntsville and duty there until March 1865. Operations in eastern Tennessee March 16 – April 22. Duty at Nashville until June. Moved to New Orleans, La., June 16, thence to Texas. Duty at Green Lake until September 4, and at San Antonio, Texas, until December.

== Casualties ==
The regiment lost a total of 221 men during service; 8 officers and 109 enlisted men killed or mortally wounded, 2 officers and 102 enlisted men died of disease.

== Commanders ==
- Colonel Abram S. Piatt
- Colonel William Sooy Smith
- Colonel Joseph G. Hawkins
- Lieutenant Colonel Elhannon M. Mast – commanded at the battle of Chickamauga; killed in action
- Major Dwight Jarvis Jr. – commanded at the battle of Stones River
- Major Joseph T. Snider – commanded the battalion at the battle of Nashville
- Captain Horatio G. Cosgrove – commanded at the battle of Chickamauga following Ltc Mast's death

== See also ==
- List of Ohio Civil War units
- Ohio in the Civil War
