= Battle of Dutton's Hill Monument =

- U.S. National Register of Historic Places
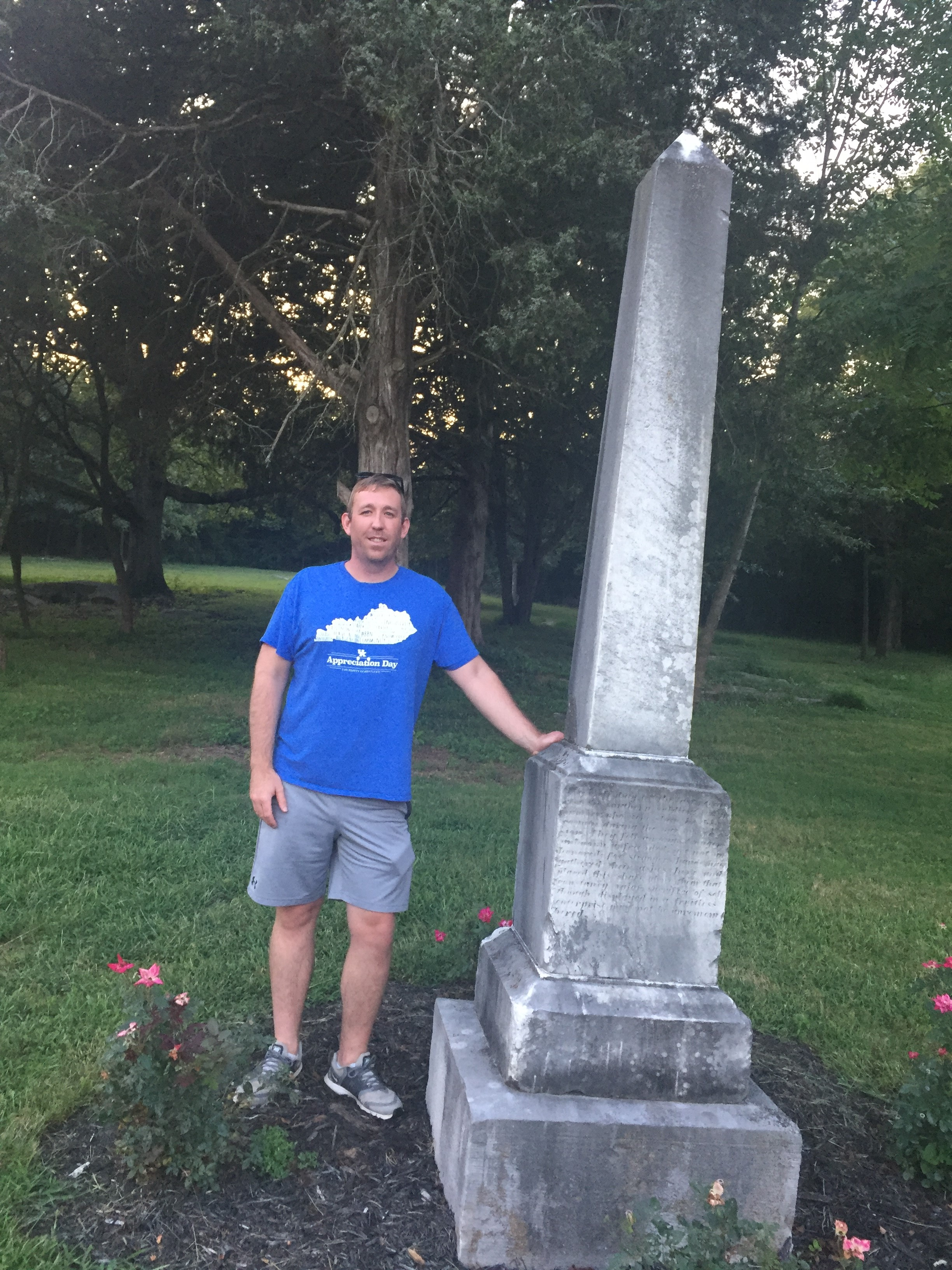
- Battle of Dutton's Hill Monument

- Location within Kentucky Location within the United States
- Location: Old Crab Orchard Rd. 1 mi. N of Jct. of KY 39 and KY 80, Somerset, Kentucky
- Coordinates: 37°07.048′N 84°35.838′W
- Built: 1875
- MPS: Civil War Monuments of Kentucky MPS
- NRHP reference No.: 97000670
- Added to NRHP: July 17, 1997

The Battle of Dutton's Hill Monument in Pulaski County, Kentucky, near Somerset, Kentucky, commemorates the Confederate soldiers who died at the battle of Dutton's Hill on March 30, 1863.

Today the battlefield of Dutton's Hill is on private property. It is located about a mile from the intersection of highways 39 and 80. A historical marker is at the entrance to four homes, (Note: Kentucky Historic Marker located 2 mi. N. of Somerset, KY 39. Marker #712, "March 30, 1863, USA force of 1,250 under General Q. A. Gillmore overtook 1,550 Confederate cavalry under Gen. John Pegram, here. Five-hour battle resulted. CSA driven from one position to another, withdrew during night across Cumberland. Killed, wounded, missing, CSA 200 and USA 30. On nine-day expedition into Ky., CSA had captured 750 cattle and took 537 across river.".) which are at the forefront of the hill. On July 17, 1997, the Battle of Dutton's Hill Monument was one of sixty-one different monuments related to the Civil War in Kentucky placed on the National Register of Historic Places, as part of the Civil War Monuments of Kentucky Multiple Property Submission. The 6' 2" marble obelisk marks a mass grave of Confederate casualties from the campaign, their names lost to history for 159 years.

The inscription on the memorial has been damaged and is barely legible today. The inscription reads:

Here, off-duty, 'till the last reveille,

rest the southern soldiers, few in
number, who were slain in this
county during the war of succes-
sion. They fell among strangers,
unknown, unfriended, yet not un-
honored; for strangers' hands have
gathered their ashes here, and
placed this shaft above them; that
constancy, valor, sacrifice of self,
though displayed in a fruitless
enterprise, may not be unremem-
bered.

== History ==
The Battle of Dutton's Hill took place on March 30, 1863. It was the culmination of Confederate General John Pegram's expedition into Kentucky. The 9-day foray into the Commonwealth was for the purpose of gathering beef cattle to feed the Army of Tennessee. Pegram led approximately 1,550 cavalry supported by a three piece battery of artillery across the Cumberland River at Stigall's Ferry on March 22. The Confederate column consisted of the 1st Louisiana, 1st Georgia, 1st and 2nd Tennessee Regiments, 16th Battalion Tennessee Cavalry (less two companies left behind in Tennessee), 1st Florida Cavalry (3 mounted companies), and Huwald's Tennessee Battery of mule-drawn mountain howitzers. By making an orderly march through Somerset, the populace was led to believe that Pegram was leading the forefront of a Confederate invasion of central Kentucky. Rumors flew as to the actual strength of Pegram's command. While foraging for cattle, Pegram's cavalry encountered Yankees on March 28 at Hickman's Bridge. Then, narrowly evading the closely following 44th and 45th Regiments Ohio Infantry, they continued to rustle cattle until they had rounded up about 750. Braxton Bragg was relying on beef to keep the Army of Tennessee supplied with nourishing food. Pegram's cavalry had herded 537 of the cattle across the Cumberland River when their luck ran out.

On March 30, 1863, about 1 1/2 miles from Somerset in Pulaski County, Kentucky, Pegram's cavalry was overtaken by a Union force of 1,250 men under the command of Brigadier General Quincy A. Gillmore. Pegram was defeated. Confederate casualty reports of the Battle of Dutton's Hill vary wildly, as to killed, wounded, or missing. General Pegram reported a rumor of 80 dead. One Union regiment reported 57 Confederates killed; another only 10.
