= John James Piatt =

American poet (1835–1917)

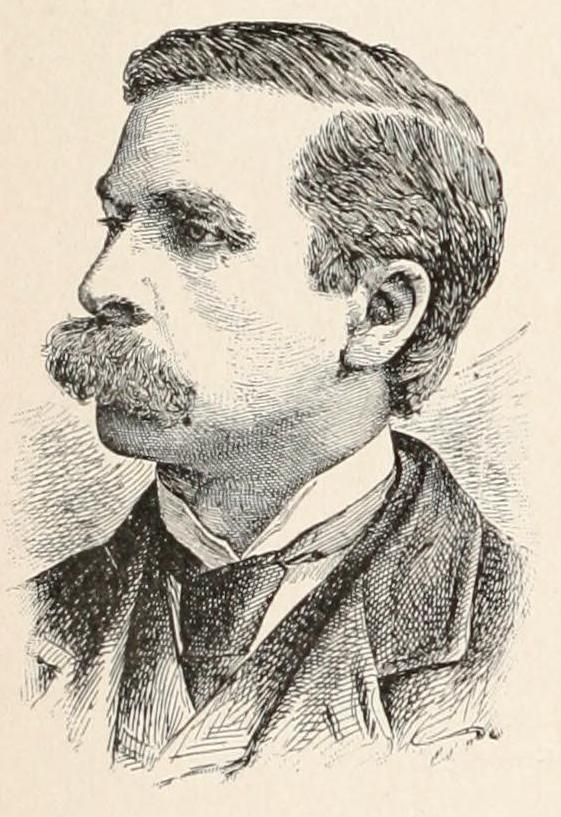
- Born: March 1, 1835; James' Mills, now Milton, Indiana, U.S.
- Died: February 16, 1917 (aged 81); Cincinnati, Ohio, U.S.
- Education: Capital University; Kenyon College
- Spouse: Sarah Morgan Bryan (m. 1861)

John James Piatt (March 1, 1835 – February 16, 1917) was an American poet.

== Early life and education ==
John James Piatt was born on March 1, 1835, in James' Mills, Dearborn County, Indiana, to Emily (Scott) and John Bear Piatt. The town was later called Milton and relocated to Ohio County, Indiana. The Piatts moved to Columbus, Ohio, when John James was six. He attended Capital University and Kenyon College.

== Career ==
Piatt was on staff at the Ohio State Journal (later The Columbus Citizen-Journal) with William Dean Howells, with whom he wrote Poems of Two Friends (1860). He published some poems in the Louisville Journal (later The Courier-Journal) in 1857 and then became an editor of the paper. He started publishing in The Atlantic Monthly in 1860.

Piatt married Sarah Morgan Bryan on June 18, 1861. They lived in Georgetown, in Washington, D.C., where John became a clerk and then librarian of the United States House of Representatives. Sarah and John James published two books together: The Nests at Washington, and Other Poems (1869) and The Children Out-of-Doors (1885). According to the Cambridge History of American Literature, Sarah and John James's poems were not interesting for their literary merit but only for their thematization of the American West.

Around 1882, Piatt became a United States consul in Cork, and later in Dublin. He came back to the United States in 1893, settling in North Bend, Ohio.

According to the Dictionary of American Biography, "Piatt's poetry shows the regular meters of his time, but is original and varied in subject mater and appreciative of natural beauty, literary associations, and human feeling." He was sometimes considered a poet of Ohio, the Ohio Valley, or the Western United States. Contemporary reviewers thought his poems were "cheerful, pleasant, and sunny". Leonidas Warren Payne Jr. considered Piatt one of the "minor poets of the West".

He died in Cincinnati, Ohio, on February 16, 1917.

== Books ==
- Poems of Two Friends, with William Dean Howells (1860)
- Poems in Sunshine and Firelight (1866)
- The Nests at Washington, and Other Poems, with Sarah Morgan Bryan Piatt (1869)
- Western Windows, and Other Poems (1869)
- Landmarks (1872)
- Pencilled Fly-Leaves: A Book of Essays in Town and Country (1880)
- Idyls and Lyrics of the Ohio Valley (1881)
- The Children Out-of-Doors, with Sarah Morgan Bryan Piatt (1885)
- At the Holy Well (1887)
- A Book of Gold, and Other Sonnets (1889)
- Little New-World Idyls (1893)
- Odes in Ohio (1897)
