= 14-pounder James rifle =

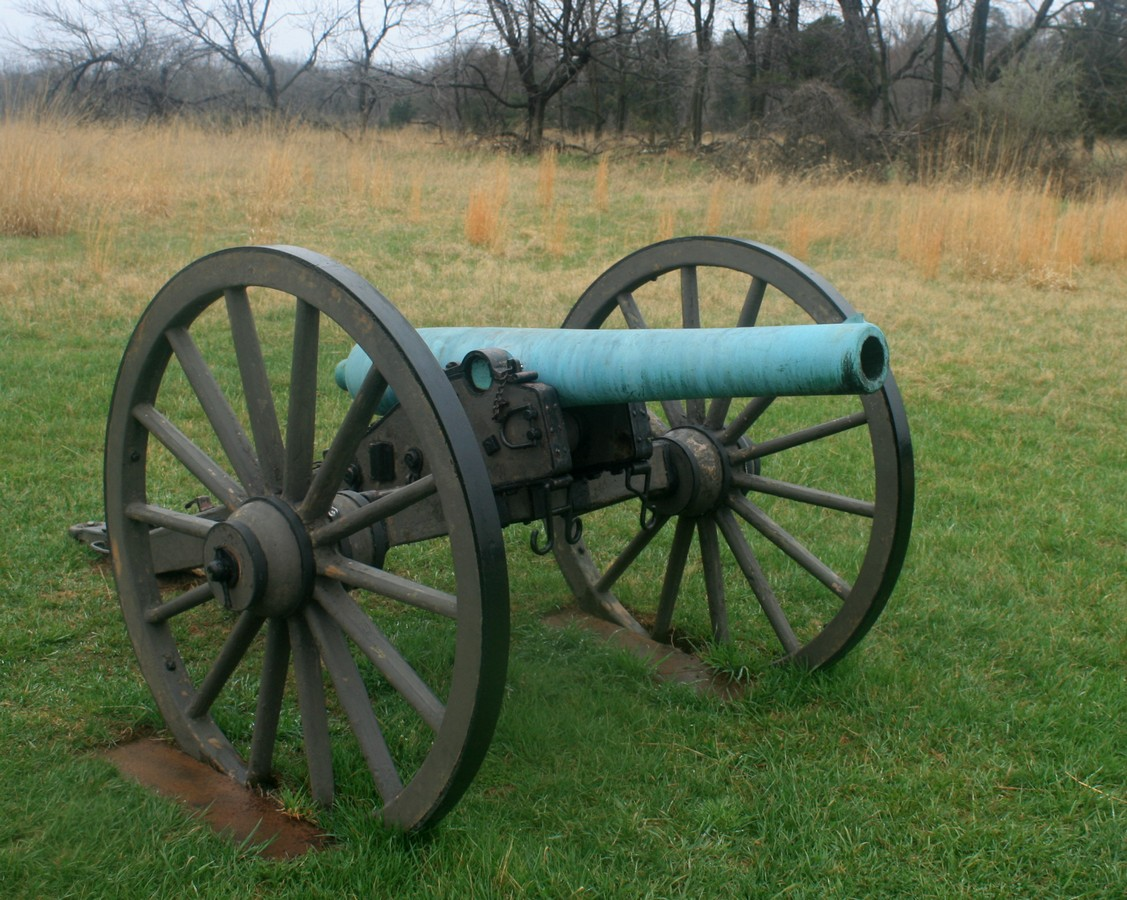
- 14-pounder James rifle (Type 2) at Manassas National Battlefield Park
- Type: Rifled cannon
- Place of origin: United States

Service history
- In service: 1861–1865
- Used by: United States
- Wars: American Civil War

Production history
- Manufacturer: Ames Manufacturing Company
- Produced: 1861
- Variants: Type 1 and Type 2

Specifications
- Mass: Type 1: 880 lb (399.2 kg); Type 2: 918 lb (416.4 kg)
- Length: Type 1: 60 in (152 cm); Type 2: 69.75 in (177 cm)
- Crew: 9
- Shell weight: 14 lb (6.4 kg) shot 0.75 lb (0.3 kg) charge
- Caliber: 3.82 in (97 mm)
- Barrels: 1
- Action: Muzzle loading
- Carriage: 900 lb (408.2 kg)
- Effective firing range: Schenkl: 1,700 yd (1,600 m); Hotchkiss: 1,530 yd (1,400 m) at 5° elevation

The 14-pounder James rifle or James rifled 6-pounder or 3.8-inch James rifle was a bronze muzzle-loading rifled cannon that was employed by the United States Army and the Confederate States Army during the American Civil War. It fired a 14 lb (6.4 kg) solid shot up to a distance of 1,530 yd (1,400 m) at 5° elevation. It could also fire canister shot and common shell. Shortly before the war broke out, the U.S. Army adopted a plan to convert M1841 6-pounder field guns from smoothbore to rifled artillery. Rifling the existing 6-pounders would both improve the gun's accuracy and increase the weight of the shell (by elongating the round). There were two major types produced, both were bronze with a bore (caliber) of 3.8 in (97 mm) that would accommodate ammunition designed by Charles Tillinghast James. The first type looked exactly like an M1841 6-pounder field gun. The second type had a longer tube with a smooth exterior profile similar to a 3-inch Ordnance rifle. At first the rifles were quite accurate. However, it was discovered that the bronze rifling quickly wore out and accuracy declined. None of the rifles were manufactured after 1862, and many were withdrawn from service, though some artillery units employed the guns until the end of the war.

== Background ==
Charles Tillinghast James invented cotton-mill machinery, then was elected Senator from Rhode Island in 1851–1857. He subsequently became a militia major general from Rhode Island and began creating projectiles suitable for rifled artillery. James was a close friend of James Tyler Ames, the owner of the Ames Manufacturing Company, so it followed that Ames forged most of the weapons that became known as James rifles. General James died in October 1862 when a new shell he was testing accidentally exploded. On 1 November 1860 a U.S. Army board recommended that half of the existing smoothbore cannons in forts and arsenals should be rifled according to the plan of General James. Accordingly, Secretary of War John B. Floyd wrote Lieutenant Colonel William J. Hardee on 14 December 1860, "I have to state that the results of trials of rifled cannon and projectiles, under the direction of this department, indicates a superiority of James expanding projectiles for such cannon. The regulation 6-pounder, with a rifled bore (weight 884 pounds), carries a James projectile of about 13 pounds." Floyd pointed out that rifling the older guns to accommodate the James shells would inexpensively double the weight of shell fired, since the shells were elongated. Floyd believed this could be done without putting too much stress on the gun barrel.

The 3.8 in (97 mm) caliber gun was commonly known as the 14-pounder James rifle, while a 3.67 in (93 mm) caliber gun was often referred to as a 12-pounder James rifle or a rifled 6-pounder. At the time, people generally failed to differentiate between the two. Actually, the 3.8-inch artillery piece was manufactured with three different types of rifling, and more than one metal and profile. Because many of the U.S. Army's existing 3.67 inch caliber 6-pounders had worn-out bores, it was found that re-boring the guns to 3.8 inch caliber would make them a uniform size. On 15 December 1860, General James signed a contract that required him to rifle half of the cannons at United States arsenals and forts. Unfortunately, there is no surviving paperwork that shows to what extent this contract was carried out. Any records are supposed to have been lost.

Late in 1861, the Ames Company received an order to produce several 6-pounder smoothbore guns and 3.8-inch rifles. These were to be called "new model" or Model of 1861. By this time, gun makers discovered that any irregularity on the exterior of a cannon was a possible source of fracture. Therefore, the "new model" guns were designed with a smooth exterior surface. Ten 6-pounder James smoothbores are known to exist. The 3.8-inch rifles became known as James rifles because they were designed to fire the James projectiles. When General George B. McClellan inquired about James rifles, Secretary of War Edwin Stanton responded by writing, "James is not known as a manufacturer of guns, and it is not known that he makes any pretense of having invented one. Ames, of Chicopee, manufactures guns, and is the manufacturer of James projectiles..."

== Specifications ==
Authors James C. Hazlett, Edwin Olmstead, and M. Hume Parks describe the 3.8-inch re-bored and rifled M1841 6-pounder field guns as Type 1 and the "new model" 3.8-inch James rifles as Type 2. The gun carriage for 12-pounder (and 14-pounder) James rifles weighed 900 lb (408 kg).

=== Type 1 ===
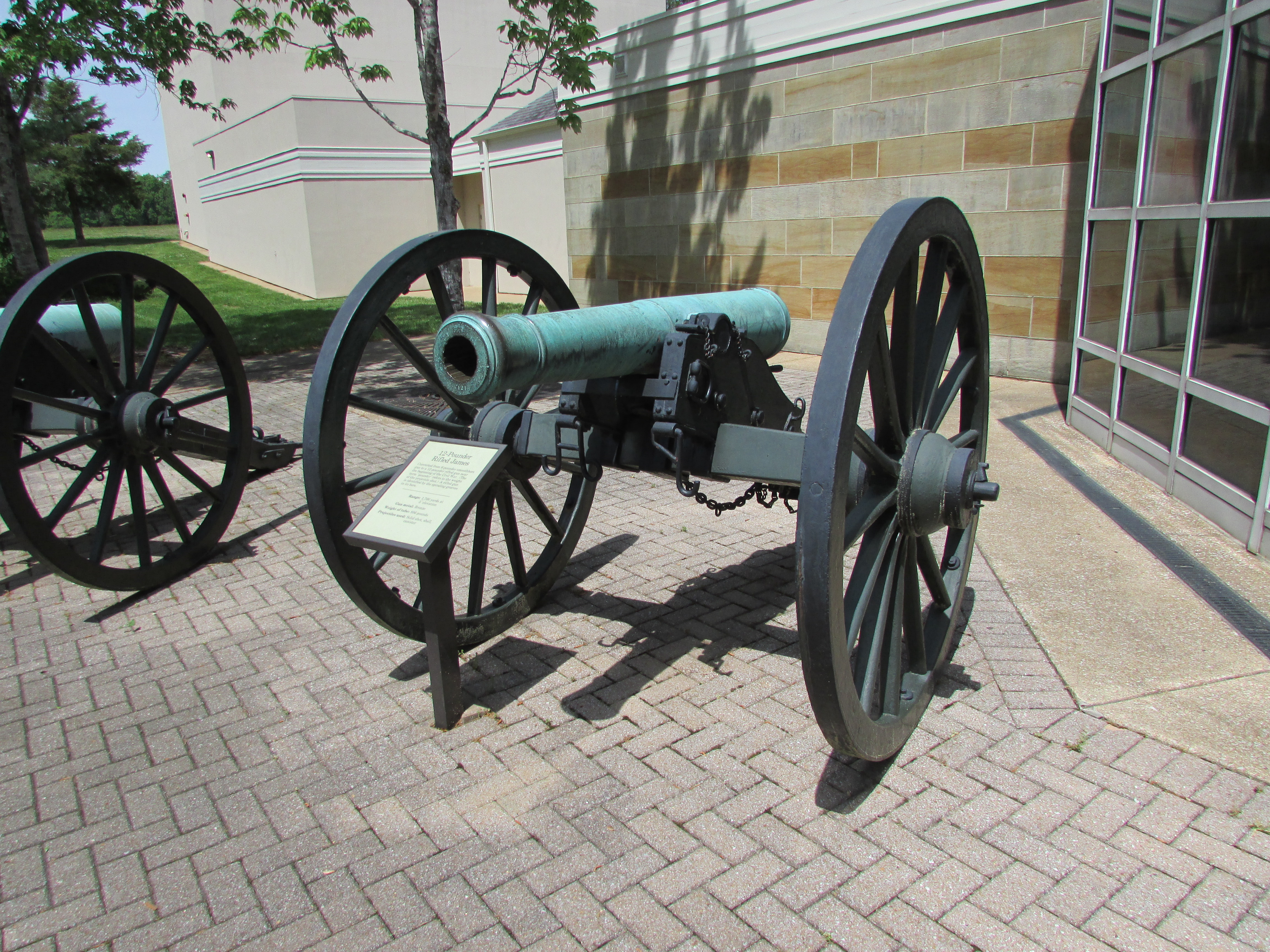
12-pounder James rifle at Chickamauga and Chattanooga National Military Park appears identical to the Type 1 gun.

The bronze pieces called Type 1 all have the external appearance of a Model 1841 6-pounder field gun, 3.8 in (97 mm) caliber, 15-groove rifling of right-hand twist, and a weight of about 880 lb (399.2 kg). More than 70 of the Type 1 rifles survive today, all except one are bronze. They are as follows. Of 6-pounders dated from 1842 up until 1861, and later rifled as Type 1, Ames produced 15 and Cyrus Alger Company produced eight. Of 6-pounders dated 1861 and 1862, and rifled as Type 1, Ames manufactured 25 and Greenwood Company manufactured 27. There is one surviving Type 1 of Confederate origin, produced by Skates and Company of Mobile, Alabama. Finally, there is one surviving cast iron Type 1 that was originally manufactured by Alger in 1854.

The Type 1 14-pounder James rifle has dimensions identical to the M1841 6-pounder field gun. The barrel length, excluding the knob, is 60 in (152.4 cm), the bore length is 57.5 in (146.1 cm), the reinforce length is 30 in (76.2 cm), and the base ring diameter is 10.3 in (26.2 cm). There was no official table of fire for Type 1 14-pounder James rifles. However, Henry Larcom Abbot published test ranges that were compiled by A. P. Rockwell of the 1st Connecticut Light Artillery Battery. Using a gunpowder charge that weighed 1.25 lb (0.57 kg), a Type 1 fired a 12 lb (5.4 kg) Schenkl shell a distance of 1,700 yd (1,554 m) at an elevation of 5° and a 14 lb (6.4 kg) Hotchkiss shell a distance of 1,530 yd (1,399 m) at an elevation of 5°.

=== Type 2 ===
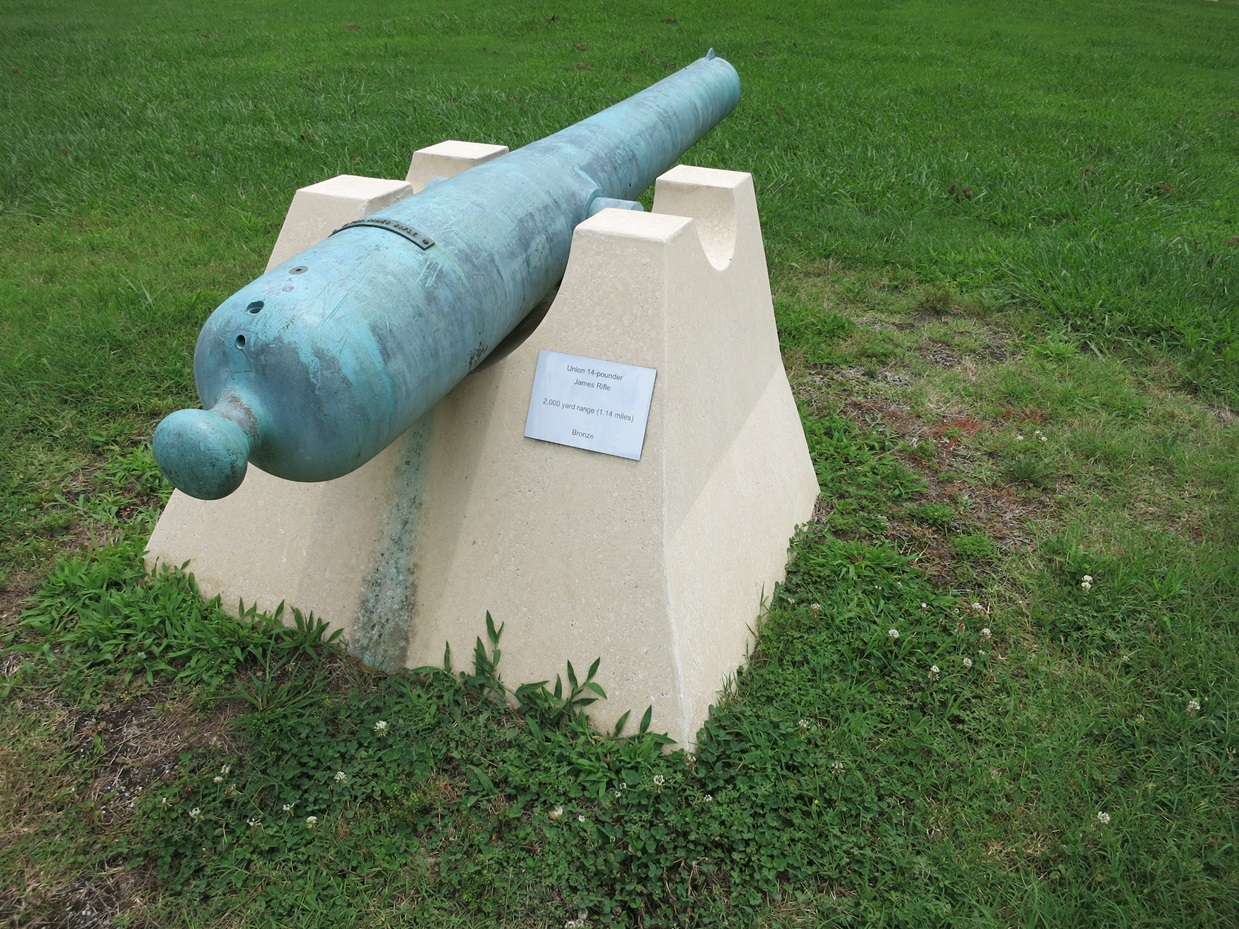
A 14-pounder James rifle is located at Petersburg National Battlefield visitor center.

The bronze Type 2 14-pounder James rifle had a smooth exterior form similar to a 3-inch Ordnance rifle and an average weight of 920 lb (417 kg). The Type 2, Series 1 had seven-groove rifling and a weight of 928 lb (421 kg), of which only five guns survive. Only Series 1 and 2 guns were stamped JAMES RIFLE CANNON on the reinforce near the vent. There are six surviving Series 2 guns, 16 surviving Series 3 guns, and 53 surviving Series 4 guns. Series 2 guns weigh an average of 922 lb (418 kg), Series 3 guns weigh 918 lb (416 kg), and Series 4 guns weigh 917 lb (416 kg). Series 2, 3, and 4 all had 10 rifling grooves of right-hand twist. Various muzzle, trunnion, and breech stampings account for the other differences between Series 1, 2, 3 and 4 guns.

The Type 2 14-pounder James rifle measured 74 in (188.0 cm) from muzzle to the end of the knob and 69.75 in (177.2 cm) from muzzle to base, excluding the knob. Its bore length was 65 in (165.1 cm) and it measured 64 in (162.6 cm) from muzzle to vent. The trunnions had a diameter of 3.67 in (93 mm) and the distance between the ends of the trunnions was 15.1 in (38.4 cm). The gun measured 41.64 in (105.8 cm) from the muzzle to the center of the trunnions. The gun barrel was 10.01 in (25.4 cm) wide at the breech and 6.38 in (16.2 cm) wide at the muzzle. The breech had a hole to which a stadia sight could be attached. The bore (caliber) was 3.82 in (97 mm).

=== Other ===
Hazlett, Olmstead, and Parks tentatively identify a Type 3 14-pounder James rifle that was made of cast steel. A record exists of a purchase order for Ames to manufacture six cast steel guns totaling 5,581 lb (2,531 kg) or about 930 lb (422 kg) each. There are three painted steel 3.8-inch rifled guns at Shiloh National Military Park that appear to match the purchase order. The guns have the same Ordnance profile as the Type 2 bronze rifles, but there is also a thicker band across the trunnions. There are 10 rifle grooves of right-hand twist. Every single type and series of James rifle listed above can be found at Shiloh National Military Park.

14-pounder James rifle variants
Type	Shape	Metal	Caliber	Rifle Grooves	Tube Weight	No. Survivors
Type 1	M1841 6-pounder	Bronze	3.8 inch	15	880 lbs.	76
Type 2 Series 1	Ordnance Profile	Bronze	3.8 inch	7	928 lbs.	5
Type 2 Series 2	Ordnance Profile	Bronze	3.8 inch	10	922 lbs.	6
Type 2 Series 3	Ordnance Profile	Bronze	3.8 inch	10	918 lbs.	16
Type 2 Series 4	Ordnance Profile	Bronze	3.8 inch	10	917 lbs.	53
Type 3	Ordnance Profile with Trunnion Band	Cast Steel	3.8 inch	10	unknown	3

=== Battery composition ===
The typical Union Army battery was armed with six guns. A team of six horses pulled each gun plus a limber which included one ammunition chest. Each gun had an additional six-horse team that pulled one caisson plus a limber which had three ammunition chests. Each battery had one traveling forge, one tools and equipment wagon, and spare horses. A gun platoon was made up of a sergeant (chief of piece), two corporals, six privates, and six drivers. The first nine men crewed the gun. Two platoons made a section led by a lieutenant and the battery was commanded by a captain. Attached to each battery were an adjutant, first sergeant, quartermaster sergeant, five artificers, two buglers, and one guidon-bearer. Confederate batteries were organized similarly.

== History ==
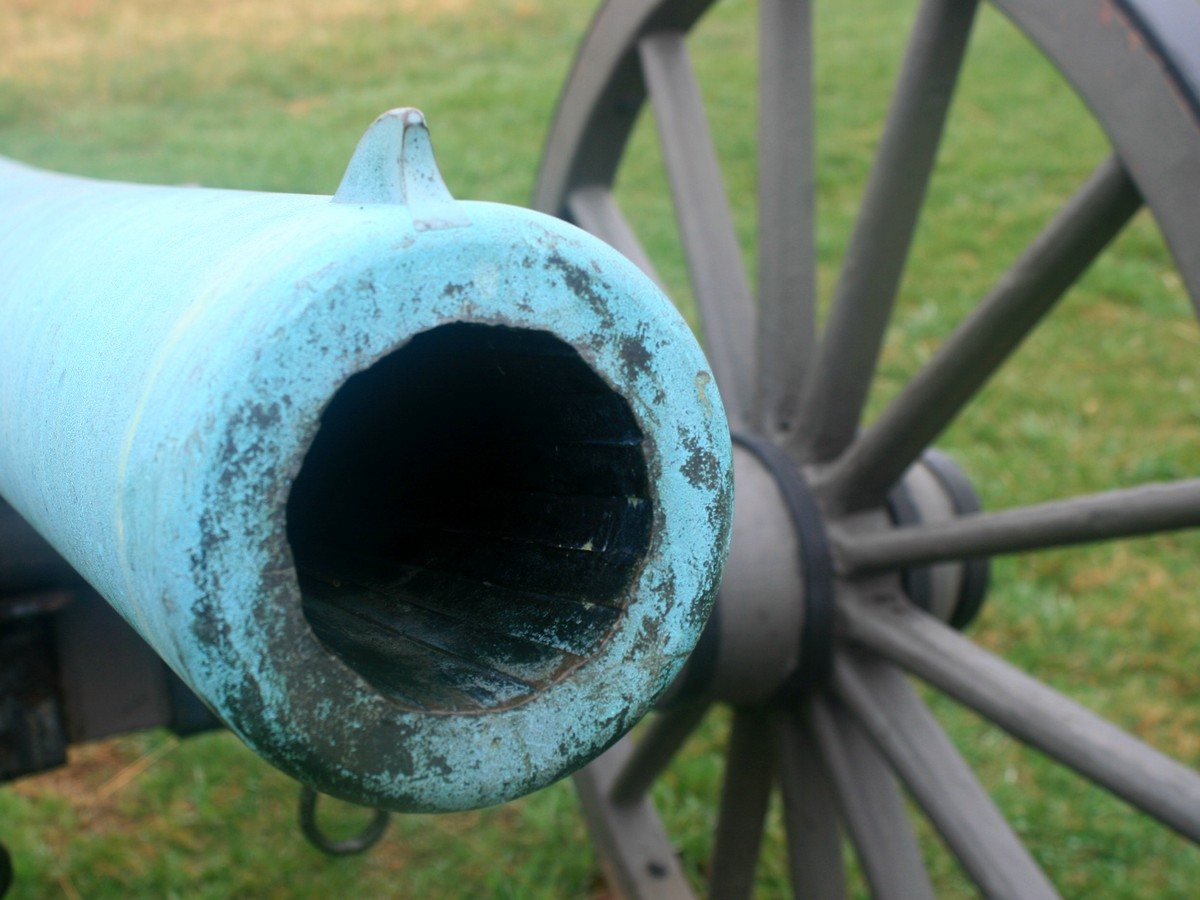
3.8-inch James rifle (Type 2) appears to have ten rifle grooves.

The 12-pounder (and 14-pounder) James rifles suffered from two disadvantages. First, the rifling wore out quickly which reduced the gun's accuracy. Second, the higher pressures in the gun barrel by the rifling severely strained the breech, causing the James rifles to frequently burst when fired. Because of these problems, many of the guns were withdrawn from service fairly early in the conflict. The guns achieved great accuracy when test fired, but the bronze rifling degraded fairly quickly. The premature death of General James may have played a part in the guns being discarded. In any case, none were produced after 1862.

At the Battle of Pea Ridge on 7–8 March 1862, Louis Hoffman's 4th Ohio Battery was armed with what is described as four 12-pounder James rifles and two M1841 12-pounder howitzers. In the first day's fighting at Leetown, the Ohio battery drove off the 6th Texas Cavalry Regiment. The 4th Ohio Battery took part in Franz Sigel's highly successful artillery bombardment on the second day. Another source specifically stated that the 4th Ohio Battery was, in fact, armed with four 3.8-inch James rifles as late as the third quarter of 1863. At that date, the 2nd Ohio, 3rd Ohio, 7th Ohio, and 10th Ohio Batteries all had four 3.8-inch James rifles, and the 5th Ohio Battery was armed with two 3.8-inch James rifles.

At the Battle of Antietam on 17 September 1862, the 1st Ohio Battery commanded by Captain James R. McMullin was attached to the Kanawha Division in the Union IX Corps. We know that the battery was armed with six 14-pounder James rifles because McMullin specifically referred to 3.800 inch guns in his after action report. By 1 October 1862, the battery was re-equipped with six 3-inch Ordnance rifles. McMullin wrote that the battery was posted within 150 yd (137 m) of Burnside's Bridge and fired on Confederate infantry and artillery at a distance of 1,800 to 2,000 yd (1,646 to 1,829 m). At 3:00 pm the battery was withdrawn because it was impossible to obtain a resupply of ammunition. The 8th Massachusetts Light Artillery, also in IX Corps, was equipped with four James rifles, but it is not known if their caliber was 3.8 inch or 3.67 inch. These were the only ten James rifles employed by the Union Army of the Potomac at Antietam; it is not recorded if the Confederate Army of Northern Virginia had any.

A few weeks later at the Battle of Perryville on 8 October 1862, the Union Army of the Ohio used 23 14-pounder James rifles out of a total of 147 guns. In the Confederate Army of Mississippi, there were only two 14-pounder James rifles out of 56 total guns. Both rifles were in Henry C. Semple's Alabama Battery. Of the Union guns that were in action, there were two 14-pounder James rifles each in Asahel K. Bush's 4th Independent Battery Indiana Light Artillery, Peter Simonson's 5th Independent Battery Indiana Light Artillery, David C. Stone's Battery "A" Kentucky Light Artillery, and Charles M. Barnett's Battery "I", 2nd Illinois Light Artillery Regiment. In each of the four engaged batteries there were three different types of cannon. For example, Stone's Battery consisted of two M1841 6-pounder field guns, two 10-pounder Parrott rifles, as well as the two 14-pounders.

On the Union side, there was a migration of less-preferred cannons from the Eastern Theater to the Western Theater of the American Civil War. By the time of the Battle of Gettysburg was fought in the east on 1–3 July 1863, the Army of the Potomac employed only four James rifles. Yet on 30 June 1863, the western Army of the Cumberland still had 45 3.8-inch James rifles in its inventory, second only in numbers to its 60 12-pounder Napoleons. Other guns included 34 3-inch Ordnance rifles, 32 10-pounder Parrott rifles, 24 M1841 6-pounder field guns, 10 M1841 12-pounder howitzers, and nine other artillery pieces. In the small Army of the Ohio, there were 26 3.8-inch James rifles, 18 12-pounder Napoleons, 12 3-inch Ordnance rifles, and 16 other guns.

Cogswell's Battery Illinois Light Artillery was armed with four 3.8-inch James rifles as late as August 1864 when the unit garrisoned Nashville, Tennessee. In December 1863, the Springfield Illinois Light Artillery also had four 3.8-inch James rifles, while Henshaw's Battery Illinois Light Artillery and the Chicago Board of Trade Battery each had two 3.8-inch James rifles. During the Battle of Nashville on 16 December 1864, Cogswell's Battery ran low on ammunition and there was a 45 minute delay before its commander was able to borrow enough ammunition from another battery to fire ten shells from each gun. After opening fire again, John McArthur's infantry division attacked and achieved a decisive break in the Confederate defenses.

== Civil War artillery ==
Characteristics of American Civil War artillery pieces
Description	Caliber	Tube length	Tube weight	Carriage weight	Shot weight	Charge weight	Range 5° elev.
M1841 6-pounder cannon	3.67 in (9.3 cm)	60 in (152.4 cm)	884 lb (401 kg)	900 lb (408 kg)	6.1 lb (2.8 kg)	1.25 lb (0.6 kg)	1,523 yd (1,393 m)
M1841 12-pounder cannon	4.62 in (11.7 cm)	78 in (198.1 cm)	1,757 lb (797 kg)	1,175 lb (533 kg)	12.3 lb (5.6 kg)	2.5 lb (1.1 kg)	1,663 yd (1,521 m)
M1841 12-pounder howitzer	4.62 in (11.7 cm)	53 in (134.6 cm)	788 lb (357 kg)	900 lb (408 kg)	8.9 lb (4.0 kg)	1.0 lb (0.5 kg)	1,072 yd (980 m)
M1841 24-pounder howitzer	5.82 in (14.8 cm)	65 in (165.1 cm)	1,318 lb (598 kg)	1,128 lb (512 kg)	18.4 lb (8.3 kg)	2.0 lb (0.9 kg)	1,322 yd (1,209 m)
M1857 12-pounder Napoleon	4.62 in (11.7 cm)	66 in (167.6 cm)	1,227 lb (557 kg)	1,128 lb (512 kg)	12.3 lb (5.6 kg)	2.5 lb (1.1 kg)	1,619 yd (1,480 m)
12-pounder James rifle	3.67 in (9.3 cm)	60 in (152.4 cm)	875 lb (397 kg)	900 lb (408 kg)	12 lb (5.4 kg)	0.75 lb (0.3 kg)	1,700 yd (1,554 m)
3-inch Ordnance rifle	3.0 in (7.6 cm)	69 in (175.3 cm)	820 lb (372 kg)	900 lb (408 kg)	9.5 lb (4.3 kg)	1.0 lb (0.5 kg)	1,830 yd (1,673 m)
10-pounder Parrott rifle	3.0 in (7.6 cm)	74 in (188.0 cm)	899 lb (408 kg)	900 lb (408 kg)	9.5 lb (4.3 kg)	1.0 lb (0.5 kg)	1,900 yd (1,737 m)
20-pounder Parrott rifle	3.67 in (9.3 cm)	84 in (213.4 cm)	1,750 lb (794 kg)	1,175 lb (533 kg)	20 lb (9.1 kg)	2.0 lb (0.9 kg)	1,900 yd (1,737 m)
