= 2nd U.S. Artillery, Battery E =

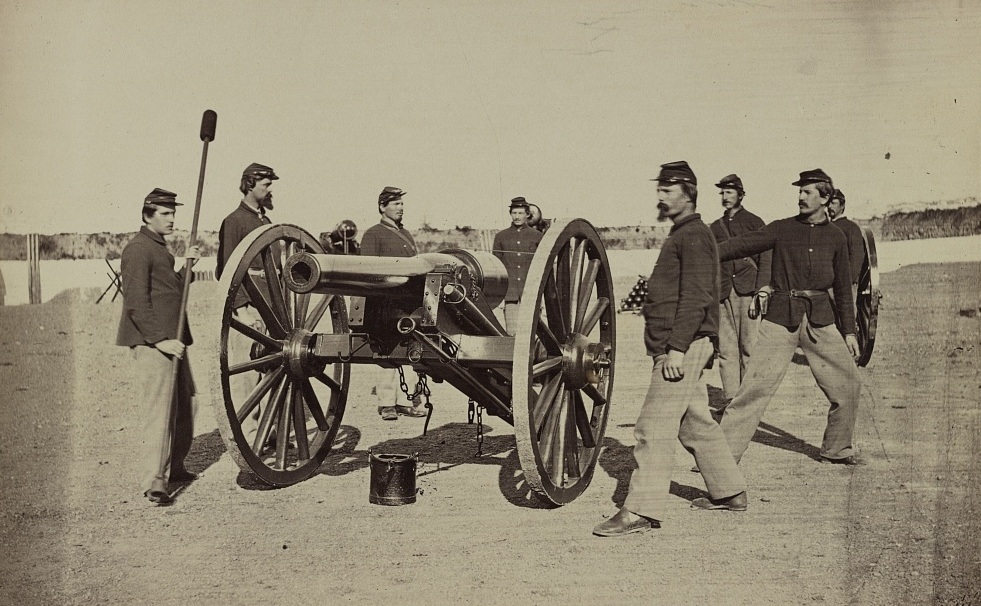
- Gun crew from the 1st Connecticut Heavy Artillery Regiment practices with a 20-pounder Parrott rifle. 2nd U.S. Artillery, Battery E was armed with the same weapons from Antietam through Fort Sanders.
- Country: United States
- Allegiance: (United States) Union
- Branch: Union Army
- Type: Field Artillery
- Size: Battery
- Equipment: 2 x 14-pounder James rifles and 2 x M1841 6-pounder field guns (1861); 6 x 20-pounder Parrott rifles (Mar 1862); 4 x 20-pounder Parrott rifles (Sept 1862)
- Engagements: American Civil War; First Battle of Bull Run (1861); Siege of Yorktown (1862); Seven Days Battles (1862); Second Battle of Bull Run (1862); Battle of Chantilly (1862); Battle of Antietam (1862); Battle of Fredericksburg (1862); Siege of Vicksburg (1863); Knoxville campaign (1863); Battle of Campbell's Station (1863); Battle of Fort Sanders (1863); Battle of the Wilderness (1864); Battle of Spotsylvania (1864); Battle of Totopotomoy Creek (1864); Battle of Cold Harbor (1864)

Commanders
- Notable commanders: Samuel Nicholl Benjamin

The 2nd U.S. Artillery, Battery E was an artillery battery that served in the Union Army during the American Civil War. The unit fought at the battles of First Bull Run in 1861 and Yorktown, the Seven Days, Second Bull Run, Chantilly, Antietam, and Fredericksburg in 1862. The following year, Battery E moved to the Western Theater where it served at Vicksburg and Knoxville. In 1864, the unit transferred back to the Eastern Theater where it fought at the Wilderness, Spotsylvania, Totopotomoy, and Cold Harbor. For the rest of the war, it became part of the Washington D.C. garrison.

== Organizations ==
Battery E was at Washington, D.C. in January 1861. The battery was attached to Robert C. Schenck's Brigade, Daniel Tyler's Division, Irvin McDowell's Army, Northeast Virginia in June–August 1861. The unit transferred to the Artillery Division, Army of the Potomac in August–October 1861. It served in Fitz John Porter's Division, Army of the Potomac from that date until March 1862. Battery E was assigned to the Artillery Reserve, Army of the Potomac in March–May 1862. The battery was assigned to the 4th Brigade in Henry Jackson Hunt's Artillery Reserve at the time of the Battle of Seven Pines on 31 May–1 June, though it was not engaged in the fighting. It served in the 5th Brigade, Artillery Reserve, V Corps, Army of the Potomac through September 1862.

Battery E transferred to Artillery, 1st Division, IX Corps in September–December 1862. The battery belonged to Artillery, 3rd Division, IX Corps from then until February 1863. It switched back to Artillery, 1st Division, IX Corps, Army of the Potomac in February–April 1863. Battery E transferred west to the District of Central Kentucky, Department of the Ohio in April–June 1863. It became part of the Artillery Reserve, IX Corps, Dept. of the Ohio in June–August 1863. Once again it was assigned to Artillery, 1st Division, IX Corps, Dept. of the Ohio from then until March 1864. Transferring east, the unit became part of the Reserve Artillery, IX Corps, Army of the Potomac in March–June 1864. Battery E was assigned to duty at Camp Barry, Washington, D.C., XXII Corps in June–November 1864. The battery consolidated with 2nd U.S. Artillery, Battery C on 24 August 1864. The unit was part of 1st Separate Brigade, XXII Corps from November 1864 to October 1865.

== History ==
=== 1861–1862 ===
Battery E advanced toward Manassas, Virginia on 16–21 July 1861, including the occupation of Fairfax Court House on 17 July. The battery fought at the First Battle of Bull Run on 21 July. Commanded by Captain J. H. Carlisle, Battery E was armed with two 14-pounder James rifles and two M1841 6-pounder field guns. Its guns were not among the 24 artillery pieces that crossed to the west bank of Bull Run with the assault brigades. The unit was part of the garrison of Washington, D.C. until March 1862 when it moved to the Virginia Peninsula. For the Peninsula campaign, the unit was equipped with six 20-pounder Parrott rifles. Battery E participated in the Siege of Yorktown on 5 April–4 May. The battery fought in the Seven Days Battles before Richmond on 25 June–1 July 1862. Specifically, it was engaged at Turkey Bridge on 30 June and at the Battle of Malvern Hill on 1 July. During the Seven Days, Captain Carlisle led both the 5th Artillery Brigade and Battery E. The battery remained at Harrison's Landing until 16 August. The unit moved to Centreville, Virginia on 16–28 August.

Battery E under the command of First Lieutenant Samuel Nicholl Benjamin fought at the Second Battle of Bull Run on 29–30 August 1862. Together with the 8th Massachusetts Light Artillery, Battery E was part of the division of Isaac Stevens in the IX Corps led by Jesse L. Reno. The unit also fought at the Battle of Chantilly on 1 September where Stevens was killed. It participated in the Maryland campaign on 6–22 September. At the Battle of Antietam on 17 September, Lieutenant Benjamin commanded four 20-pounder Parrott rifles. He recorded no casualties at Antietam and reported three officers and 97 enlisted men present for duty on 22 September. A return from 1 October listed three officers and 90 enlisted men. During the battle, the battery supported the attack on Burnside's Bridge. The battery remained on the east bank of Antietam Creek throughout the fighting. It was near Warrenton, Virginia on 15 November.

At the Battle of Fredericksburg on 13 December 1862, Battery E under Captain Benjamin's command served in George W. Getty's 3rd Division of the IX Corps under Orlando B. Willcox. Benjamin complained in his after battle report about the "miserable quality of the ammunition" with which the battery was provided. He admitted tossing 53 rounds of shell and shrapnel into a stream because the ammunition was visibly defective. He wrote that the paper time fuses often failed to ignite. The Schenkl percussion shells broke up while still in the gun barrel and many did not explode on contact. The Parrott shells broke up in the gun or exploded at the muzzles of the guns.

=== 1863–1865 ===
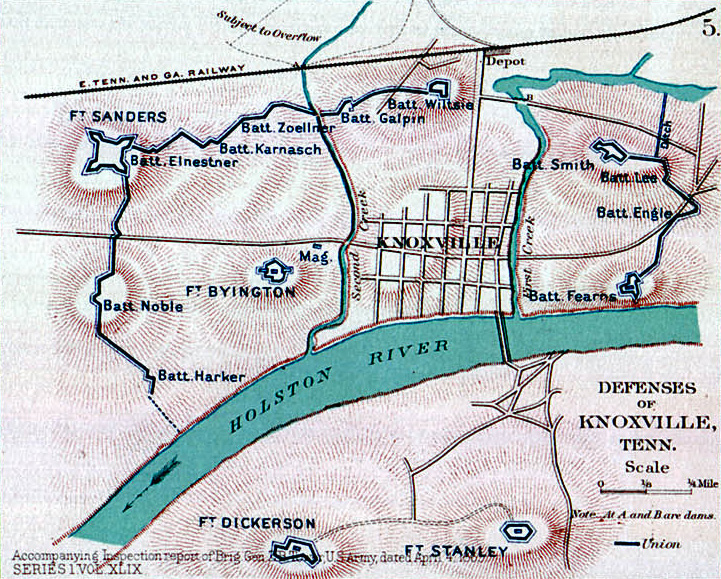
Fort Sanders is shown at upper left.

Battery E participated in the Mud March on 20–24 January 1863. The unit shipped to Newport News on 10 February and served there until March 19. The battery traveled to Kentucky on 19–23 March and performed duties in the District of Central Kentucky until June. Battery E moved to Vicksburg on 7–14 June and participated in the Siege of Vicksburg on 14 June–4 July 1863. During the siege, the IX Corps was led by John Parke. Battery E was the only unit in the corps Reserve Artillery. The unit advanced to Jackson, Mississippi on 4–10 July where it took part in the Siege of Jackson until 17 July. The battery traveled first to Covington, Kentucky then to Crab Orchard, Kentucky on 4–18 August. Battery E marched to Knoxville, Tennessee on 10–26 September. It took part in the Knoxville campaign on 4 November–23 December. The battery fought at the Battle of Campbell's Station on 16 November. It participated in the Siege of Knoxville on 17 November–5 December.

Battery E led by Lieutenant Benjamin fought in the Siege of Knoxville. During skirmishing on 18 November, the battery was asked to fire on some Confederate snipers in a house about 2,500 yd (2,286 m) distant. Engineer officer Orlando Metcalfe Poe reported that Benjamin's gunner put a round into the room occupied by the snipers. Poe wrote, "During the whole war, I never saw a prettier shot." Still armed with four 20-pounder Parrotts, the battery was assigned to defend Fort Sanders. The other defenders were Captain William W. Buckley's Battery D, 1st Rhode Island Light Artillery (six 12-pounder Napoleons), one section of Captain Jacob Roemer's 34th Independent Battery New York Light Artillery (two 3-inch Ordnance rifles), 120 soldiers from the 79th New York Volunteer Infantry, 100 men from the 2nd Michigan Volunteer Infantry Regiment, 80 men from the 20th Michigan Volunteer Infantry Regiment, and 75 men from the 29th Massachusetts Infantry Regiment. The Battle of Fort Sanders began after 6:00 am on 29 November 1863 when Confederate brigades assaulted the fort but were repulsed with serious losses.

From December 1863 until March 1864, Battery E took part in operations in East Tennessee. The unit traveled to Annapolis, Maryland before participating in the Overland Campaign on 4 May–7 June. At the beginning of the campaign, the battery was commanded by Lieutenant James S. Dudley and was one of six batteries of the Artillery Reserve of IX Corps under Ambrose Burnside. Battery E fought at the Battle of the Wilderness on 5–7 May 1864, the Battle of Spotsylvania on 8–21 May, the Battle of Totopotomoy Creek on May 28–31 May, and the Battle of Cold Harbor on 1–7 June. At Cold Harbor, Lieutenant Samuel B. McIntire commanded the battery. Shortly afterward, Battery E was ordered to return to Washington, D.C. where it served as a garrison until October 1865.

== Commanders ==
- Captain J. Howard Carlisle (1st Bull Run, Seven Days)
- Lieutenant Samuel Nicholl Benjamin (2nd Bull Run, Antietam, Fredericksburg, Vicksburg, Fort Sanders)
- Lieutenant James S. Dudley (Wilderness)
- Lieutenant Samuel B. McIntire (Cold Harbor)

== See also ==
- List of United States Regular Army Civil War units
