= Samuel Benjamin =

Samuel Benjamin may refer to:

- Samuel Greene Wheeler Benjamin (1837–1914), American diplomat
- Samuel Nicoll Benjamin (1839–1886), U.S. Army officer and Medal of Honor winner
- Samuel Benjamin (footballer) in 2012 Woodlands Wellington FC season
