= 1st Massachusetts =

1st Massachusetts may refer to:

- 1st Massachusetts Battery, a unit of field artillery during the American Civil War
- 1st Massachusetts Regiment, a unit of infantry during the American Revolutionary War
- 1st Massachusetts Volunteer Infantry, a unit of infantry during the American Civil War
- 1st Massachusetts Volunteer Cavalry Regiment, a unit of cavalry during the American Civil War
- 1st Massachusetts Volunteer Heavy Artillery, a unit of heavy artillery during the American Civil War
