= Springfield Illinois Light Artillery =

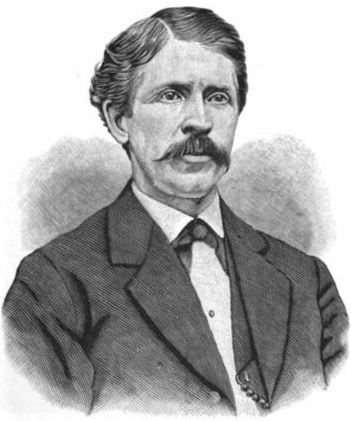
- Capt. Thomas F. Vaughn commanded the battery.
- Active: 21 Aug. 1862 – 30 June 1865
- Country: United States
- Allegiance: (United States) Union; Illinois
- Branch: Union Army
- Type: Field Artillery
- Size: Artillery Battery
- Equipment: 6 × 14-pounder James rifles
- Engagements: American Civil War; Battle of Bayou Fourche (1863); Battle of Prairie D'Ane (1864); Battle of Jenkins' Ferry (1864)

Commanders
- Notable commanders: Thomas F. Vaughn

The Springfield Illinois Light Artillery, also known as Vaughn's Independent Illinois Battery or Battery A, 3rd Illinois Light Artillery, was an artillery battery from Illinois that served in the Union Army during the American Civil War. Organized in August 1862, the unit was first stationed at Bolivar, Tennessee. In August–September 1863 the battery participated in Frederick Steele's expedition to Little Rock, Arkansas, being engaged at Bayou Fourche. In spring 1864, the battery took part in the Camden Expedition, fighting at Prairie D'Ane and Jenkins' Ferry. The unit sat out the remainder of the war in Little Rock before being mustered out of service in June 1865.

== Formation ==
The Springfield Light Artillery was organized at Springfield, Illinois and mustered into Federal service on 21 August 1862. Thomas F. Vaughn of Providence, Rhode Island was appointed captain. Vaughn previously commanded Battery B, 1st Rhode Island Light Artillery from 25 August 1861 until 1 December 1861 when he resigned his commission. Vaughn led the Rhode Island battery at the Battle of Ball's Bluff where the unit suffered the loss of one gun and several casualties. The other officers of the Springfield Light Artillery were First Lieutenants Edward B. Stillings and Henry D. Colby, both from Springfield, and Second Lieutenants Charles W. Thomas of Belleville and Louis D. Rosette of Springfield. Rank and file included Sergeant Major Louis B. Smith, First Sergeant Alexander Busby, and Quartermaster Sergeant William E. Fitzhugh, all of Springfield, five sergeants (three from Springfield, two from Wenona), 12 corporals (six from Wenona, four from Springfield, two from Magnolia), one guidon bearer, one bugler, one wagoner, five artificers, and 93 privates.

According to a July 1863 report, the battery was armed with six 14-pounder James rifles. At that time, the battery reported having the following 3.80-inch ammunition on hand: 180 Hotchkiss canister shot, 36 Tatham's canister shot, 30 James canister shot, 250 James solid shot, and 451 James common shell. The battery originally included a section (two guns) of M1841 12-pounder howitzers, so that it also reported having the following 12-pounder smoothbore ammunition: 72 common shell, 42 spherical case, and 50 canister shot. In the ordnance tables, the battery was referred to as Company A, 3rd Illinois Light Artillery, though there were no other companies (B, C, D, etc.) listed under the 3rd regiment.

== Organizations ==
The Springfield Light Artillery remained on duty at Camp Butler near Springfield from August until 1 November 1862. The battery traveled to Bolivar, Tennessee on 1–8 November where it was attached to the District of Jackson, Tennessee in the original XIII Corps, Army of the Tennessee. From December 1862 to March 1863, Vaughn's Illinois Battery defended the Post of Bolivar, District of Jackson, XVI Corps. In March–May 1863, the battery was part of the 1st Brigade, 3rd Division, XVI Corps. In May–August 1863, it transferred to the 3rd Brigade, 3rd Division, XVI Corps. Vaughn's Battery was assigned to True's Brigade, Arkansas Expedition in September 1863. The battery was part of Artillery, 2nd Division, Army of Arkansas from September 1863 to January 1864. The unit formed part of Artillery, 2nd Division, VII Corps, Department of Arkansas in January–March 1864. The Springfield Light Artillery was in the 2nd Brigade, 1st Division, VII Corps in March–April 1864. The unit was reassigned to Artillery, 3rd Division, VII Corps in April–May 1864. Vaughn's Battery was part of Artillery, 1st Division, VII Corps from May 1864 to June 1865.

== History ==
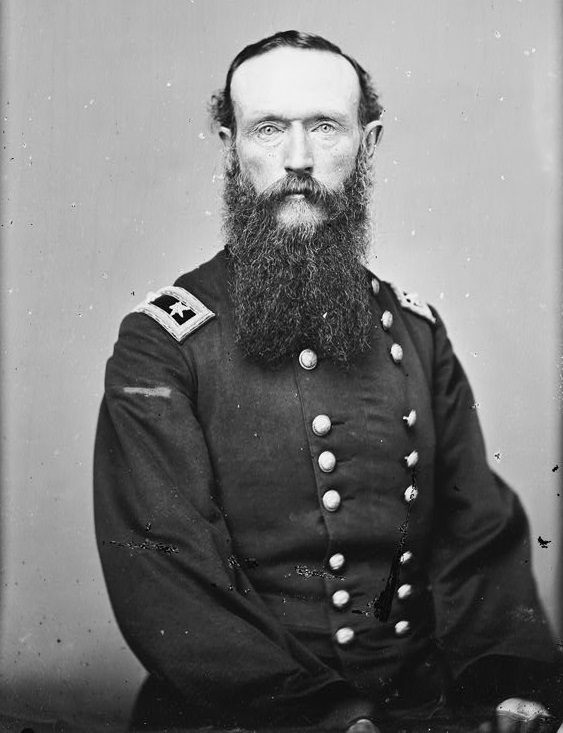
Frederick Steele

The Springfield Illinois Light Artillery arrived at Bolivar and was assigned to a brigade commanded by Mason Brayman. On 15–20 December 1862, two sections participated in an expedition against Confederate raiders under Nathan Bedford Forrest. Vaughn's Battery performed garrison duty at Bolivar from November 1862 until 18 June 1863. Brayman's Bolivar garrison also included the 43rd Ohio, 12th Michigan, 43rd Illinois, and 61st Illinois Infantry Regiments on 30 January 1863. The battery was parceled out to guard the Memphis and Charleston Railroad with one section each at Moscow, Collierville, and Germantown through 23 August 1863. The unit traveled to Helena, Arkansas on 24 August–2 September 1863, then joined Frederick Steele's expedition to Little Rock on 2–10 September 1863.

In the expedition's order of battle, Colonel James M. True's Independent Brigade included the notation, "Ill. Battery, Capt. Thomas F. Vaughan". On 5 August 1863, Steele began his campaign by marching from Helena to the White River with two infantry divisions and one cavalry brigade. Steele met John Davidson's 6,000 Union cavalry and the combined 13,000-man force advanced west from DeValls Bluff on 18 August. True's brigade joined later and increased Steele's force to 14,500 soldiers, of whom only 10,500 men were present for duty. Sterling Price entrenched most of his 7,749 Confederate troops on the north bank of the Arkansas River, with a weaker force watching the south bank.

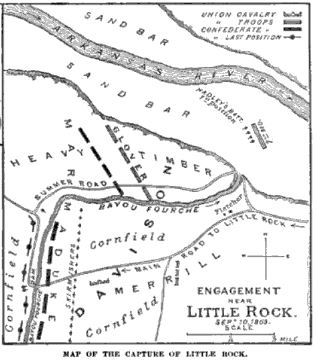
Capture of Little Rock, Sept. 10, 1863

The Springfield Illinois Light Artillery fought at the Battle of Bayou Fourche and the subsequent capture of Little Rock on 10 September. On the evening of 9 September, Federal engineers began constructing a pontoon bridge at Terry's Ferry on the Arkansas River downstream from Little Rock. The next morning, the bridge was fired on by Confederate artillery, but it was quickly silenced by a converging bombardment by several Union batteries deployed on the north bank. By 10:00 am, Union infantry secured a bridgehead on the south bank and Davidson's cavalry began crossing. Meanwhile, Steele advanced along the north bank with the bulk of his infantry to confront Price's defenses. On the south bank, Davidson's cavalry brigades under John Montgomery Glover and Lewis Merrill moved west to Bayou Fourche where John S. Marmaduke organized a defensive position. Supported by artillery firing from the north bank of the Arkansas River, Glover's brigade turned the Confederate left flank. When Price saw that his north bank defenses were outflanked by the Union advance along the south bank, he ordered Little Rock to be evacuated.

Vaughn's Battery performed garrison duty at Little Rock from September 1863 until March 1864. One section was sent to defend Lewisburg, Arkansas between 19 October 1863 and 15 March 1864. First Lieutenant Stillings resigned on 18 February 1864 and Second Lieutenant Thomas was promoted to fill the vacancy. Another 72 men were recruited into the battery, most of them in December 1863 and January 1864, but several joined the unit in 1865. The wagoner, one sergeant, and one private drowned in the Arkansas River at Little Rock. Others died or deserted. One private was sentenced to Alton Military Prison on 2 May 1863 to serve out his term of enlistment.

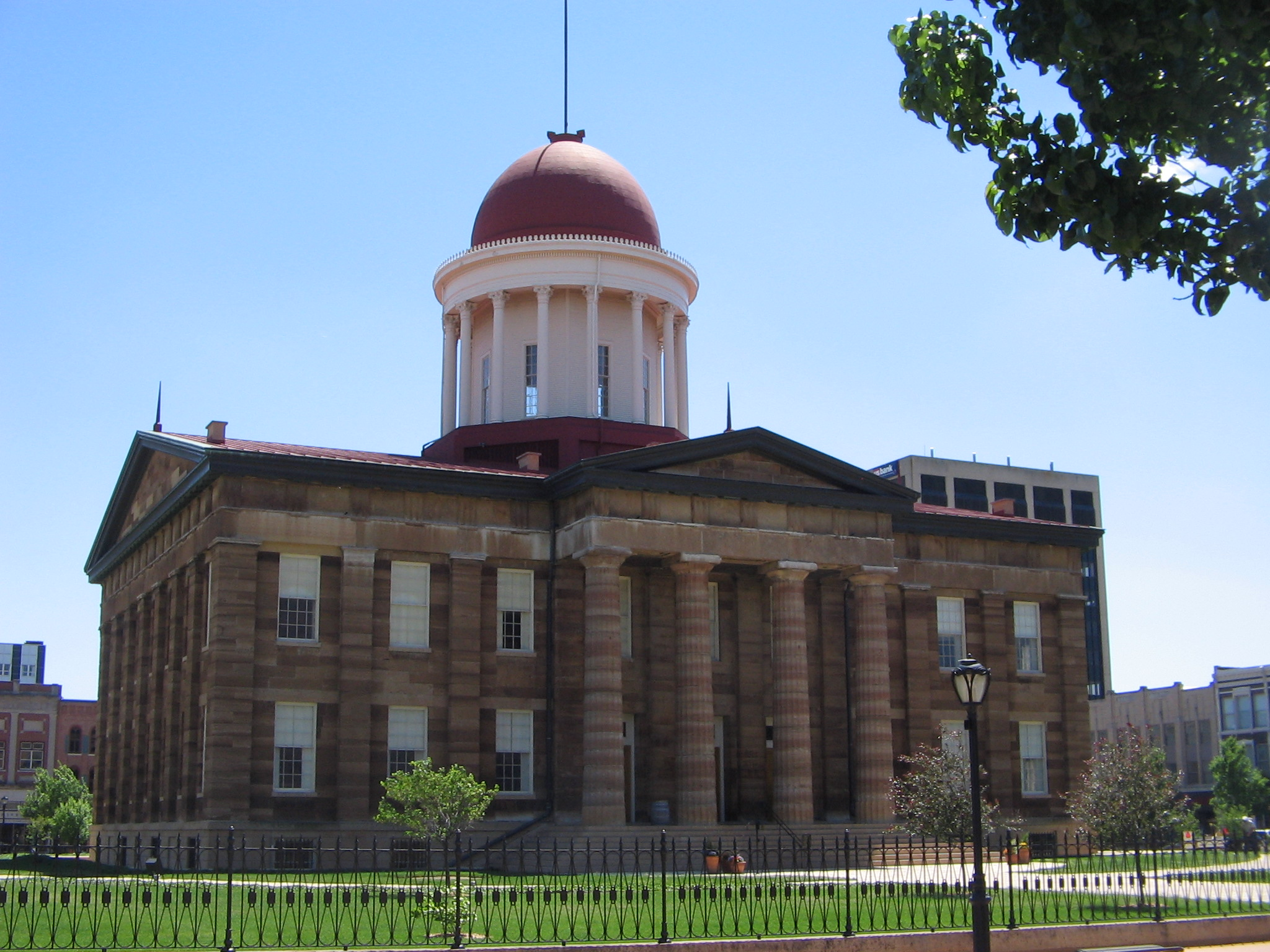
Old State Capitol State Historic Site preserves the Civil War era Springfield, Illinois capitol.

On 17 March 1864, the Springfield Illinois Light Artillery was reunited and participated in Steele's Camden Expedition from 23 March–3 May 1864. During the campaign, Vaughn's Battery was part of the artillery contingent of Frederick Salomon's 3rd Division. Steele's effective force numbered 13,000 troops of which about 2,500 became casualties. There was a skirmish at Okolona on 2–3 April. The Battle of Prairie D'Ane occurred on 9–12 April. Steele's VII Corps seized Camden but was unable to maintain its position because Confederate cavalry wrecked two supply convoys at Poison Spring and Marks' Mills. On 26 April, Steele's force abandoned Camden and marched back toward Little Rock. The Federal column reached the Saline River on 29 April and paused while the engineers built a pontoon bridge across the rain-swollen stream. The Battle of Jenkins' Ferry was fought on 30 April. Though outnumbered, Salomon's soldiers improvised defensive positions on the south bank and repulsed repeated Confederate assaults during the morning. After the last attack ended at 12:30 pm, Salomon's division withdrew across the river and destroyed the pontoon bridge. The Federals reported 63 killed, 413 wounded, and 45 missing, while Confederate returns showed 86 killed, 356 wounded, and one missing. Steele's force continued its retreat to Little Rock.

Vaughn's Battery was on garrison duty at Little Rock from May 1864 to June 1865. First Lieutenant Colby resigned on 28 June 1864 and Second Lieutenants Rosette and John Schaefer of Wenona were promoted to first lieutenant. Second Lieutenant James Irwin of Chatham was promoted to first lieutenant on 19 July 1864. First Lieutenant Thomas resigned on 17 September 1864. The other new second lieutenants were Ward Bertram and Albert Flood of Springfield and William M. Gillmore of Wenona. The battery was ordered to Springfield, Illinois, on 25 June and mustered out 30 June 1865. During its service one enlisted man was killed in battle and 22 enlisted men died by disease.

== See also ==
- List of Illinois Civil War units
