= Cogswell's Battery Illinois Light Artillery =

American Civil War Union artilerty battery

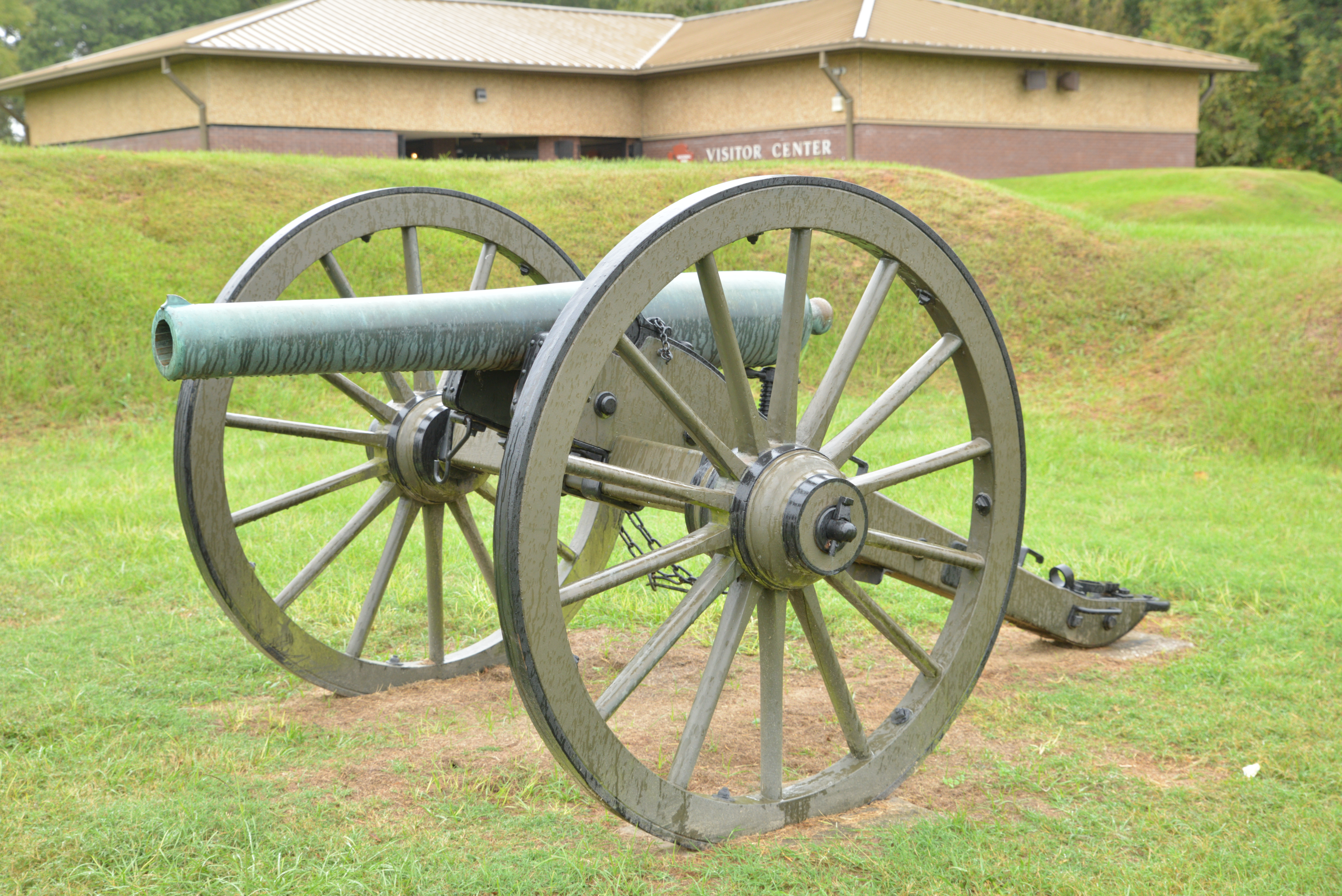
- Cogswell's Battery was armed with 14-pounder James rifles. One is shown above.
- Active: 12 Nov. 1861 – 14 Aug. 1865
- Country: United States
- Allegiance: (United States) Union; Illinois
- Branch: Union Army
- Type: Field Artillery
- Size: Artillery Battery
- Equipment: 4 × 14-pounder James rifles
- Engagements: American Civil War; Siege of Corinth (1862); Siege of Vicksburg (1863); Jackson Expedition (1863); Battle of Missionary Ridge (1863); Knoxville campaign (1863); Battle of Nashville (1864); Battle of Spanish Fort (1865); Battle of Fort Blakeley (1865)

Commanders
- Notable commanders: William Cogswell

Cogswell's Battery Illinois Light Artillery was an artillery battery from Illinois that served in the Union Army during the American Civil War. Organized in November 1861 as Company A, 53rd Illinois Infantry Regiment, it was detached as an independent artillery battery in March 1862. The battery participated in the Siege of Corinth in May 1862. The unit remained near Memphis, Tennessee until June 1863 when it was ordered to reinforce the Siege of Vicksburg. Cogswell's Battery took part in the Jackson Expedition, the Missionary Ridge and in the Knoxville campaign in 1863. After performing garrison duty for most of 1864, the unit fought at Nashville in December. In spring 1865, the battery fought at Spanish Fort and Fort Blakeley during operations against Mobile, Alabama. The battery was mustered out in August 1865.

== Formation ==
Cogswell's Battery Illinois Light Artillery was organized at Ottawa, Illinois as Company A (artillery) of William H. W. Cushman's 53rd Illinois Infantry and mustered into Federal service on 12 November 1861. William H Cogswell of Ottawa was appointed captain. The other officers were First Lieutenants S. Hamilton McClary of Ottawa and Henry G. Eddy of Lockport and Second Lieutenants Asa Williams of Chicago and Hiram S. Prescott of Ottawa. Enlisted men included First Sergeant William R. Elting, Quartermaster Sergeant William H. Pierce, six sergeants (five from Ottawa, one from Toledo, Ohio), 12 corporals (seven from Ottawa, two from Ancona, one from Farm Ridge, one from Freedom, one from Long Point), two musicians, four artificers, and 91 privates. Second Lieutenant Prescott resigned on 26 March 1862 and First Sergeant Elting was promoted to the rank. Second Lieutenant Williams was dismissed by court-martial on 17 September 1862.

Cogswell's Battery was armed with four 14-pounder James rifles. In a December 1862 return (which was submitted over a year late), the battery reported having the following 3.80-inch caliber ammunition: 285 Hotchkiss solid shot, 25 James solid shot, 350 James common shell, 74 James canister shot, and 79 Tatham canister shot. The battery's small arms included 13 Army revolvers, one Navy revolver, and two cavalry sabers.

== Organization ==
On 28 February 1862, the 53rd Illinois Infantry moved to Chicago and guarded prisoners there until 17 March. On that date, A Company was permanently detached as an independent battery and ordered to St. Louis where it arrived on March 23. Cogswell's Illinois Battery embarked for Pittsburg Landing, Tennessee on April 8. The unit was attached to 3rd Division, Army of the Tennessee until July 1862. It was assigned to Artillery, 5th Division in July–November 1862. In the latter month, the battery became part of Artillery, 5th Division, District of Memphis, Right Wing XIII Corps (Old), Department of the Tennessee. The unit was reassigned to Artillery, 1st Division, District of Memphis, XIII Corps in November–December 1862. Cogswell's Battery was reassigned to Artillery, 1st Division, XVII Corps from December 1862 to January 1863.

Cogswell's Battery transferred to Artillery, 1st Division, XVI Corps in January–July 1863. The unit became part of Artillery, 4th Division, XV Corps Army Corps in July 1863. It transferred to Artillery, 7th Division, XVII Corps in July–September 1863. The battery was part of Artillery, 2nd Division, XVII Corps in September–December 1863. The unit joined Artillery, 3rd Division, XV Corps from December 1863 to April 1864. The battery was part of Artillery Reserve, Nashville, Tennessee, Department of the Cumberland in April–December 1864. It joined the 1st Brigade, 1st Division, Detachment Army of the Tennessee, Department of the Cumberland from December 1864 to February 1865. Cogswell's Battery became part of Artillery Brigade, XVI Corps (New), Military Division West Mississippi in February–August 1865.

== History ==
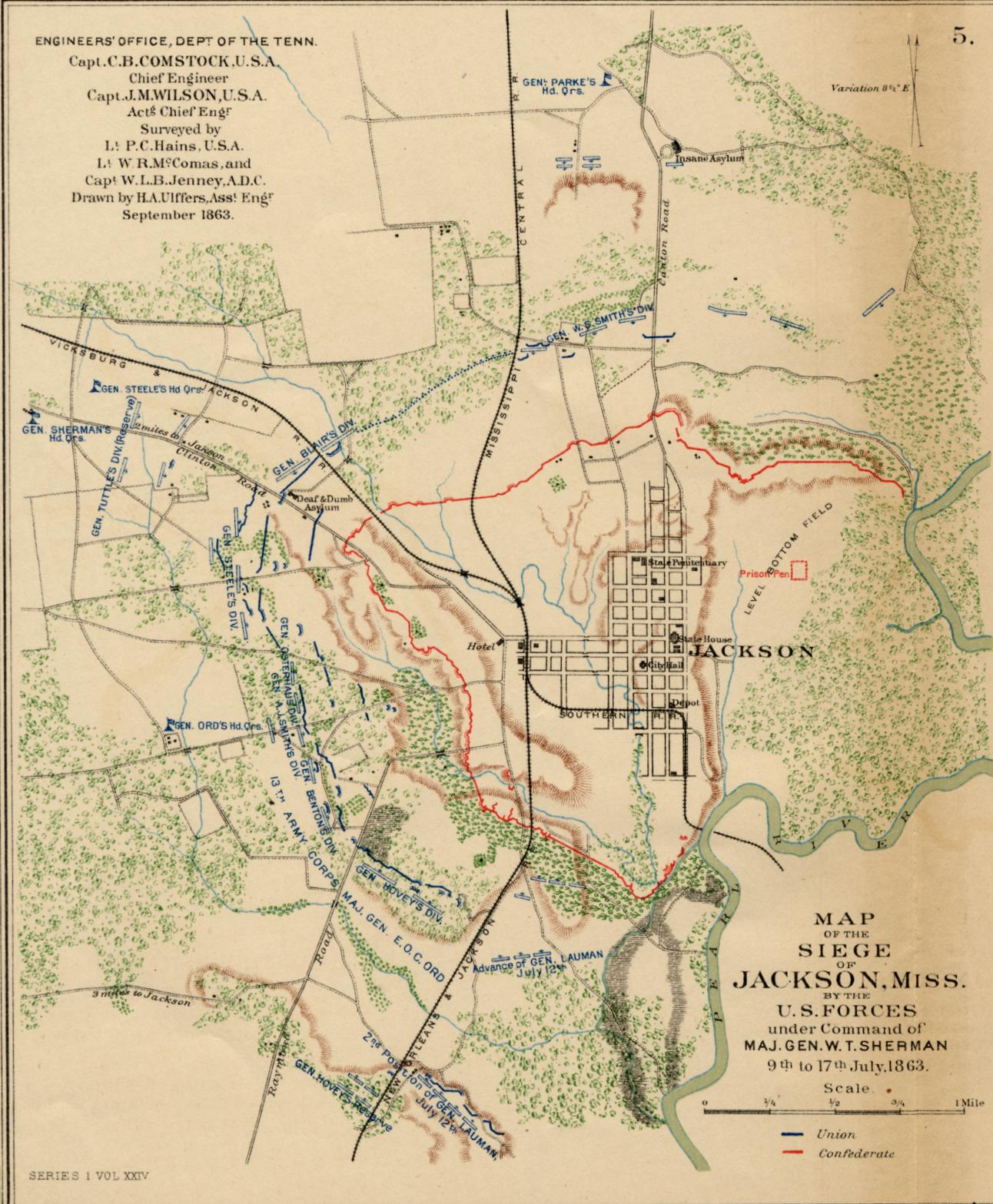
The battery was in W. S. Smith's division (top) at the Siege of Jackson.

After arriving at Pittsburg Landing, Cogswell's Illinois Battery was attached to Lew Wallace's 3rd Division. The battery participated in the Siege of Corinth from 29 April to 30 May 1862. One private was killed while on duty at Gravel Ridge, Tennessee on 19 May during the siege. The unit marched to Memphis on 1–14 March and stayed there in garrison until November. It was part of James W. Denver's 5th Division. Cogswell's Battery took part in Ulysses S. Grant's Central Mississippi Campaign on 24 November–12 December 1862. The battery retreated to Grand Junction, Tennessee where it remained on 9 January–8 March 1863. Two privates were killed in a railroad accident at La Grange, Tennessee on 29 January 1863. The unit was at La Grange from March–June. Cogswell's Battery moved to Memphis on 4 June and from there to Vicksburg on 6–11 June. The battery participated in the Siege of Vicksburg in 11 June–4 July 1863. During the siege, the unit formed part of Artillery, William Sooy Smith's 1st Division, Cadwallader C. Washburn's XVI Corps. Captain Cogswell took charge of the division's four artillery batteries while Lieutenant Eddy commanded Cogswell's Battery. A monument to Cogswell's Battery Illinois Light Artillery is located at Vicksburg National Military Park. It is on Union Avenue, 0.1 mi (0.2 km) west of Grant Avenue.

After Vicksburg surrendered, the battery took part in the Jackson Expedition, advancing to Jackson, Mississippi on 5–10 July and besieging the place on 10–17 July. Cogswell's Battery guarded the Big Black River until 28 September 1863. On that date it moved first to Memphis, then took part in operations on the Memphis and Charleston Railroad in Alabama on 20–29 October. The unit served in the Chattanooga campaign, fighting in the Battle of Missionary Ridge on 23–24 November 1863. Commanded by Captain Cogswell, the battery was assigned to Artillery, John E. Smith's 2nd Division, XVII Corps. The unit participated in the Knoxville campaign from 28 November to 8 December, marching to the relief of the Federal garrison of Knoxville, Tennessee. The battery was assigned to garrison duty in Alabama from December 1863 to April 1864. There were 106 recruits added to Cogswell's Battery. Most of these men arrived in January–March 1864, though some arrived earlier, and some arrived later. On 11 April 1864 at Huntsville, Alabama, a caisson accidentally exploded, killing four soldiers. Another man died the following day.

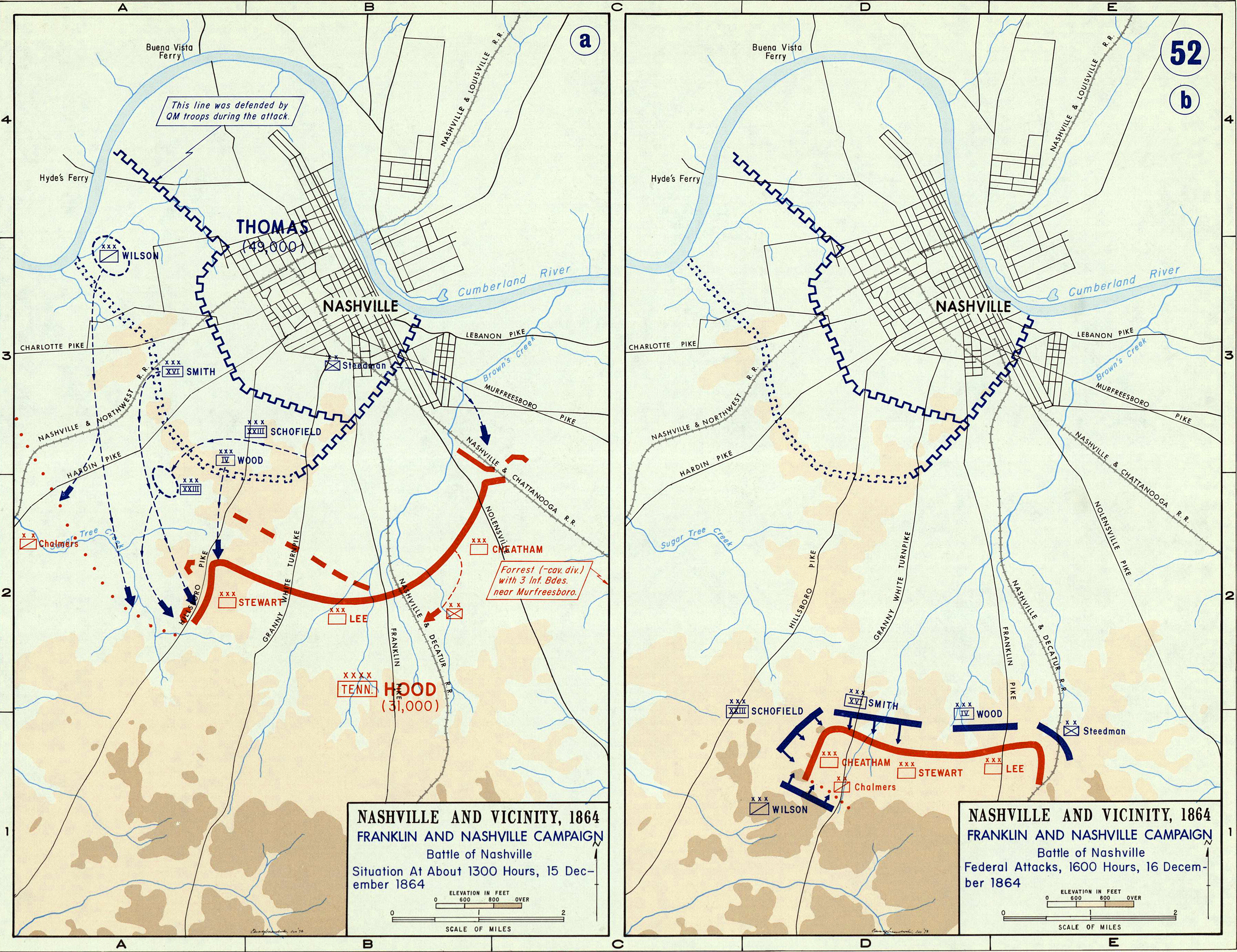
Maps show the Battle of Nashville on Dec. 15 (left) and Dec. 16 (right).

On 29 April 1864, Cogswell's Battery moved to Nashville, Tennessee to serve as part of its garrison until December. Sergeant William Burgess was promoted second lieutenant on 25 June 1864. First Lieutenant Eddy was mustered out on 20 November 1864 and Second Lieutenant McClary was promoted to first lieutenant on the same date. Captain Cogswell mustered out on 8 December and First Lieutenant Elting was promoted captain on the same date. Many of the original enlisted men mustered out in November and December 1864, though others re-enlisted. In August 1864 while at Nashville, the battery reported having the following 3.80-inch ammunition: 170 Hotchkiss common shell, 149 Hotchkiss canister shot, 31 James solid shot, 247 James common shell, and 109 James canister shot. There were 752 James rifle cartridge bags, 740 friction primers, and 12 portfires.

The battery fought at the Battle of Nashville on 15–16 December 1864 under the command of Lieutenant McClary. It was assigned to William L. McMillen's 1st Brigade, John McArthur's 1st Division, Andrew Jackson Smith's Army of the Tennessee Detachment. On the first day, A. J. Smith's troops, with James H. Wilson's cavalry on their right, successfully assaulted the left flank of John Bell Hood's Confederate defenses. Shelling from Cogswell's battery, the 2nd Iowa Battery, and the fire of skirmishers combined to silence the Confederate guns in Redoubt Five, the first fort assaulted on the left flank of the defenses, within an hour of opening fire soon after 13:00 on 15 December. Once the guns were silenced, Redoubts Five and Four were quickly taken by McMillen's brigade, and Cogswell's battery then fired a short preparatory bombardment before the infantry assault on Redoubt Three. On the second day, McMillen's brigade overran part of the opposing defenses and the Confederate army was soon fleeing from the field. In this action, ammunition shortages in Cogswell's battery delayed the infantry attack, but after ammunition was borrowed from a neighboring battery the assault on Shy's Hill went ahead following a bombardment by the battery. From 17–28 December 1864, Cogswell's Illinois Battery joined in the pursuit of Hood's army as far as the Tennessee River. The battery moved first to Clifton, Tennessee and then to Eastport, Mississippi where it performed garrison duty until 5 February 1865. The unit moved to New Orleans on 5–22 February.

Cogswell's Battery took part in the campaign against Mobile, Alabama and its defenses on 17 March–12 April. The battery fought at the Battle of Spanish Fort on 26 March–8 April and the Battle of Fort Blakeley on 9 April. In these operations, Edward Canby led 32,000 soldiers of the XIII Corps under Gordon Granger and XVI Corps under A. J. Smith. On 8 April, the Confederates evacuated Spanish Fort with the loss of 500 prisoners and over 40 guns. The next day, a mass assault seized Fort Blakeley with over 40 guns and 3,423 prisoners. Union casualties in these operations numbered 1,417. Federal troops occupied Mobile on 12 April. Canby's army marched to Montgomery, Alabama on 13–25 April. Cogswell's Battery was on duty in Montgomery until July and the soldiers were mustered out of service on 14 August 1865. The battery lost 26 enlisted men by disease during its service. (Note: Reece's report showed one private killed while "on duty". This is in conflict with Dyer, who reported no combat deaths.)

== See also ==
- List of Illinois Civil War units

== Notes ==
Footnotes

Citations
