= Ellwood Walter =

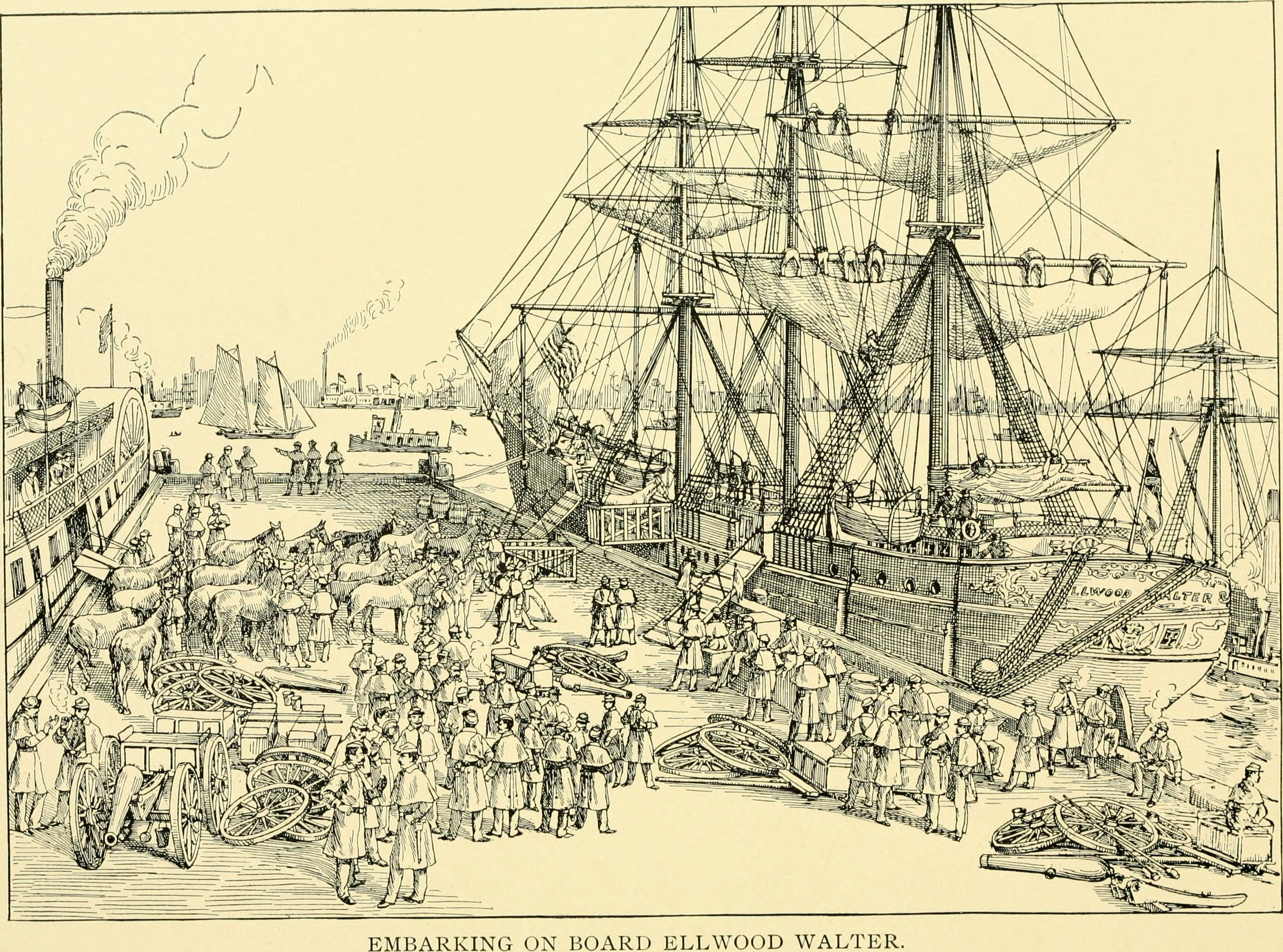
- Ellwood Walter

History

United States
- Name: Ellwood Walter
- Owner: John B. Sardy
- Operator: Chadwick
- Builder: Thomas Stack
- Launched: 1855
- In service: circa 1855 - 1863

General characteristics
- Displacement: 122 ton
- Length: 136 feet long
- Beam: 36 1/2 feet
- Propulsion: sails
- Sail plan: Schooner-rigged

The Ellwood Walter was a ship used as a Liverpool packet ship in the 19th century. She was also chartered to take a Battery to Port Royal during the American Civil War.

== 1855 Launch of the Ellwood Walter ==
On January 16, 1855, the launch of the ship named the Ellwood Walter was announced in the New York Daily Tribute: "Yesterday afternoon, shortly after 4 o'clock, the fine ship Elwood Walter was launched from the yard of Mr. Thomas Stack, foot of North Second. The vessel is 136 feet long on deck, 26 1/2 feed beer, 22 feed deep, and about 1,200 tons measurement. She was built for Mr. John B. Sardy and others. She is intended for their line of Liverpool packets, and will be commanded by Capt. James Malony. The vessel glided from the stocks in fine style, in the presence of several hundred persons, who came to see her launching."

The Ellwood Walter, has the following ship registrations:

Year	Vessel	Rig	Master	Source
1858	Ellwood Walter	Ship	Maloney	New-York Marine Register, 1858
1859	Ellwood Walter	Ship	Maloney, J	American Lloyd's Register of American and Foreign Shipping, 1859
1861	Ellwood Walter	Ship	Chadwick, A.	American Lloyd's Register of American and Foreign Shipping, 1861
1862	Ellwood Walter	Ship	Chadwick, A.	American Lloyd's Register of American and Foreign Shipping, 1862
1863	Ellwood Walter	ship	Chadwick, A.	American Lloyd's Register of American and Foreign Shipping, 1863

== Ellwood Walter - New Haven to Port Royal ==
On January 1, 1862, the Connecticut First Battery of Artillery was under orders to travel to Port Royal, South Carolina on the Ellwood Walter at the time of the Civil War. Captain Chadwick (see above ship registrations) was chartered to take the Battery to Portal Royal to go to the front lines. This account was written in the book History of the First Light Battery Connecticut Volunteers, 1861-1865: "A large packet ship of the Black Ball line, the Ellwood Walter, Capt. Chadwick, of Lyme, had been chartered to take the Battery to Port Royal, South Carolina. There was much to be done before the ship was ready for the troops. Berths had to be built, stalls made between decks, and guns and ammunition loaded."
