= 8th Massachusetts Battery =

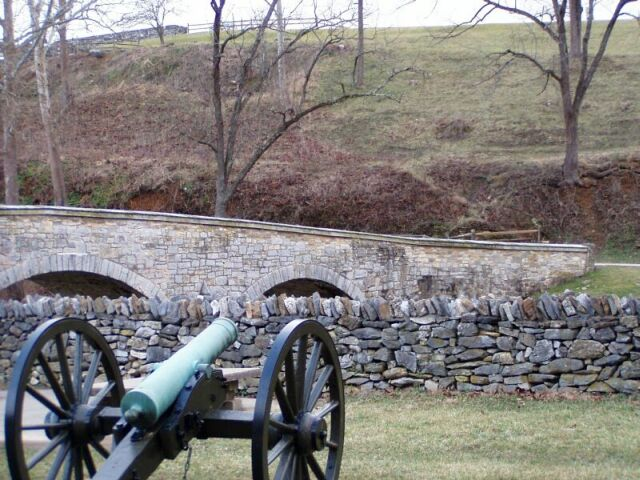
- M1841 12-pounder howitzer is located at Antietam National Battlefield near Burnside's Bridge. The 8th Massachusetts Battery had two of these weapons.
- Active: 24 June 1862 to 29 Nov. 1862
- Country: United States
- Allegiance: (United States) Union
- Branch: Union Army
- Type: Field Artillery
- Size: Battery
- Equipment: Four 12-pounder James rifles Two M1841 12-pounder howitzers
- Engagements: American Civil War; Second Battle of Bull Run (1862); Battle of Chantilly (1862); Battle of South Mountain (1862); Battle of Antietam (1862)

Commanders
- Notable commanders: Asa M. Cook

The 8th Massachusetts Battery (or 8th Battery, Massachusetts Light Artillery) was an artillery battery that served in the Union Army during the American Civil War. The units personnel enlisted for six months in 1862, but during its brief service it participated in the battles of Second Bull Run, Chantilly, South Mountain, and Antietam. The battery was mustered out on 29 November 1862, having lost one enlisted man killed in action and 10 men dead of disease.

== Service ==
The 8th Massachusetts Battery was organized at North Cambridge, Massachusetts, on 24 June 1862 for a six-month enlistment. The battery left Massachusetts and arrived in Washington, D.C., on 27 June. It served in Samuel D. Sturgis's Reserve Corps in the Military District of Washington through August. For the remainder of its career, the 8th Massachusetts Battery served in the 1st Division, IX Corps. The battery was mustered out on 29 November 1862, having lost one enlisted man killed in action and 10 men dead of disease.

== History ==
The 8th Massachusetts battery remained in camp near Fairfax Seminary, Virginia from 1 July to 8 August 1862. It moved first to Alexandria, Virginia, and then to Aquia Creek and Falmouth, Virginia during 8–11 August. The battery participated in Pope's Campaign in Northern Virginia from 16 August to 2 September. It fought at Groveton on 29 August, Second Bull Run on 30 August, Chantilly on 1 September, South Mountain on 14 September, and Antietam on 16–17 September 1862.

During the Second Battle of Bull Run and campaign, the 8th Massachusetts Battery under Captain Asa M. Cook and 2nd U.S. Artillery, Battery E under Samuel Nicholl Benjamin were part of Isaac Stevens's division in the IX Corps. The corps was led by Jesse L. Reno. Stevens's division consisted of six infantry regiments organized into three brigades. Cook's and Benjamin's batteries reported losses of three killed and 10 wounded during the campaign. The Battle of Chantilly was fought in a rainstorm. Learning that a Confederate column under Stonewall Jackson was trying to turn the Federal right flank, John Pope sent Reno's corps and other units to intercept it. Stevens was killed during the action.

The 8th Massachusetts and Benjamin's batteries were part of Orlando B. Willcox's 1st Division at the Battle of South Mountain on 14 September. About 2:00 pm, Willcox's division reinforced Jacob Dolson Cox's Kanawha Division which was skirmishing with Confederate forces. Willcox deployed his troops on Cox's right and drawn back at an angle like an inverted V. A section of Cook's 8th Massachusetts Battery unlimbered at the apex of the angle, about 400 yd (370 m) from the summit. These guns dueled with John Lane's Confederate battery for a short time before one gun was disabled. Another gun was moving up to replace the damaged piece when James W. Bondurant's Confederate battery suddenly opened a heavy fire from a distance of 600 yd (550 m). Cook's limber drivers panicked and rode to the rear through the lines of the 17th Michigan Volunteer Infantry Regiment. While some of the gun crews also fled, Cook and others maintained their position, sustaining losses of one killed and four wounded. Finally, Cook ordered his men to withdraw into the woods, abandoning the guns. Soon afterward, Willcox's troops advanced and drove the Confederate infantry back. Cook's guns were recovered and the battery again opened fire on Confederate troops near Turner's Gap. Later in the action Cook's and Independent Battery D, Pennsylvania Light Artillery (George W. Durell's) silenced Lane's battery.

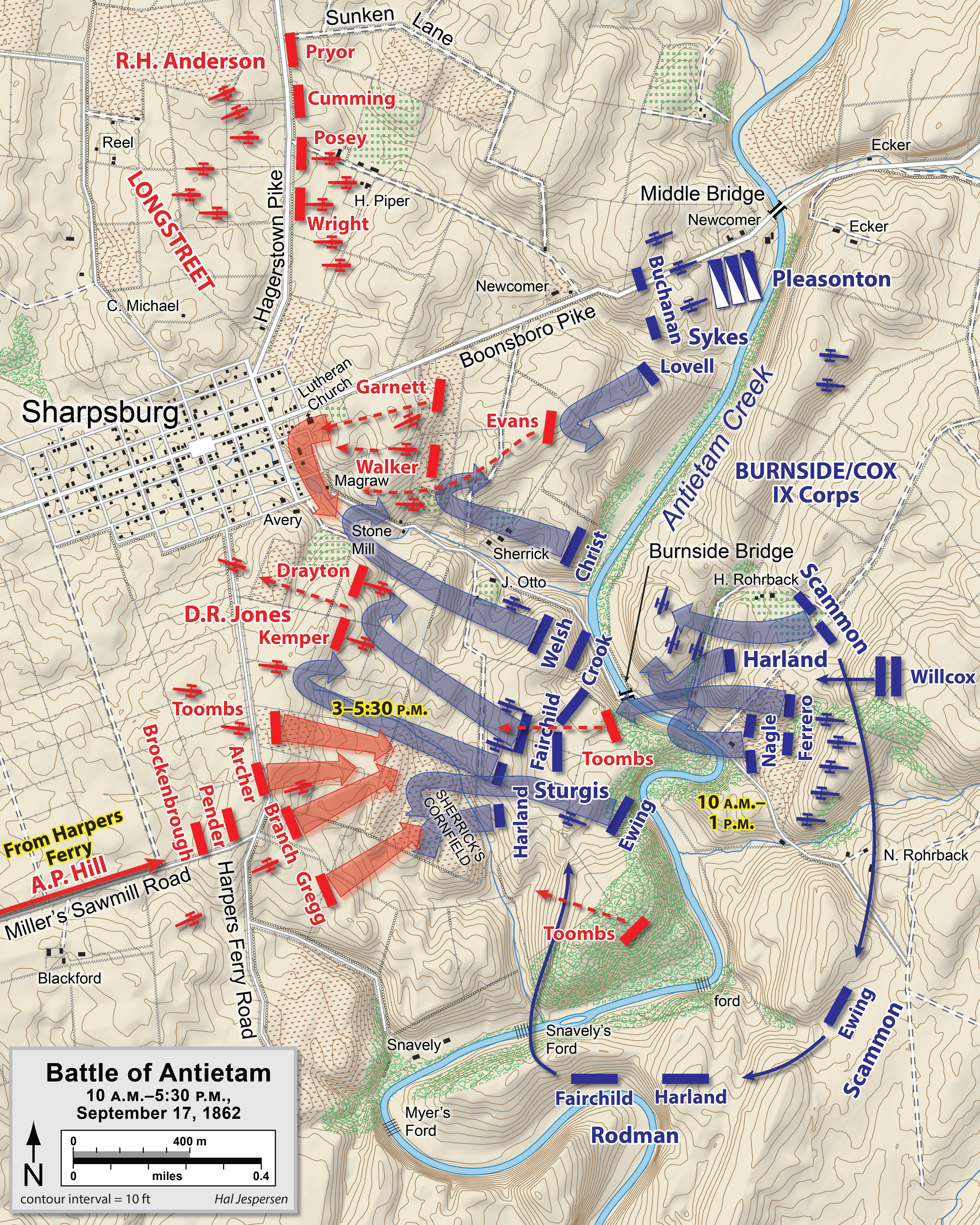
Map shows the fighting around Burnside's Bridge. The battery can be seen on this map near the J. Otto Farm.

At the Battle of Antietam on 17 September, the 8th Massachusetts Battery was commanded by Cook. The unit now counted four officers and 122 enlisted men and sustained one man wounded during the action. The battery's armament consisted of four 12-pounder James rifles and two M1841 12-pounder howitzers. During the assault on Burnside's Bridge, the 8th Massachusetts and six other batteries pounded the Confederate defensive position. Initially, Cook's battery took a position south of the bridge on the east side of Antietam Creek and fired on Benjamin F. Eshleman's Confederate battery. The Federal batteries were unable to suppress the opposing artillery file until the Union infantry seized a bridgehead. At that time, 4th U.S. Artillery, Battery E (Joseph C. Clark's), 5th U.S. Artillery, Battery A (Charles P. Muhlenberg's), and Durell's battery crossed the creek, followed by Cook's battery. The batteries moved west about 500 yd (457 m) to the ridge crest to support the infantry's advance. Cook's and Clark's batteries advanced to the J. Otto house in support of Willcox's division. A section of the 8th Massachusetts battery under Lieutenant John N. Coffin advanced 200 yd (180 m) in front of the infantry and came under close range fire from Confederate guns.

In the late afternoon several of A. P. Hill's brigades reached the field and began attacking the Union left flank. The soldiers of John Gregg's brigade, wearing captured blue uniforms, tricked some Federal units by calling out, "Cease fire, you are firing upon your own men". Hugh Boyle Ewing's Union brigade marched into this confused situation and was mistakenly targeted by Cook's battery and Federal infantry, which caused friendly fire casualties. Later, Coffin's section of two 12-pounder howitzers disrupted the 35th Massachusetts Infantry Regiment as it retreated through its ranks. Soon after, Coffin's section took post on the right flank of the 35th Massachusetts and helped it hold its position. One of Coffin's shells exploded next to a gun in David G. McIntosh's Confederate battery, mortally wounding a gunner.

The battery remained at Antietam Creek until 6 October 1862. It moved to Washington, D.C., to refit on 5–9 October. From the capital, the unit marched to Pleasant Valley, Maryland from 21 to 26 October. Its final movement was to Falmouth from 26 October to 19 November, where the unit was mustered out.

== See also ==
- List of Massachusetts Civil War units
- 1st Massachusetts Battery - another unit commanded by Asa Cook
