= 20-pounder Parrott rifle =

Type of rifled cannon

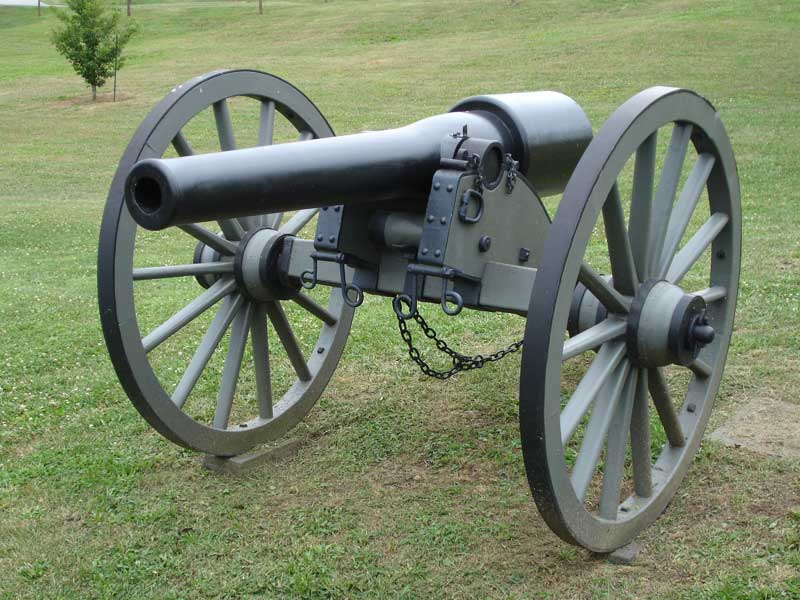
- A 20-pounder Parrott rifle is located at Gettysburg National Military Park.
- Type: Rifled cannon
- Place of origin: United States

Service history
- In service: 1861–1865
- Used by: United States; Confederate States
- Wars: American Civil War

Production history
- Designer: Robert Parker Parrott
- Designed: 1859–1860
- Manufacturer: West Point Foundry
- Unit cost: $380
- Produced: 1861–1864
- No. built: United States: c. 300; Confederate States: 45+

Specifications
- Mass: 1,750 lb (794 kg)
- Length: 84 in (2.13 m)
- Shell weight: 20.0 lb (9.1 kg) shell 2.0 lb (0.9 kg) charge
- Caliber: 3.67 in (93 mm)
- Barrels: 1
- Action: Muzzle loading
- Carriage: 1,175 lb (533 kg)
- Muzzle velocity: 1,250 ft/s (381 m/s)
- Effective firing range: 1,900 yd (1,700 m) at 5°

The 20-pounder Parrott rifle, Model 1861 was a cast iron muzzle-loading rifled cannon that was adopted by the United States Army in 1861 and employed in field artillery units during the American Civil War. As with other Parrott rifles, the gun breech was reinforced by a distinctive wrought iron reinforcing band. The gun fired a 20 lb (9.1 kg) projectile to a distance of 1,900 yd (1,737 m) at an elevation of 5°. The 20-pounder Parrott rifle could fire shell, shrapnel shell (case shot), canister shot, and more rarely solid shot. In spite of the reinforcing band, the 20-pounder earned a dubious reputation for bursting without warning, killing or injuring gunners. The Confederate States of America also manufactured copies of the gun.

== Background ==
Robert Parker Parrott was an ordnance officer in the US Army who inspected cannons manufactured at the West Point Foundry in Cold Spring, New York. In 1836, president of the company Gouverneur Kemble persuaded Parrott to resign from the Army and join his firm. Several years before the American Civil War, gun founders grappled with the problem of rifling cannons. Bronze smoothbore cannons had windage – or space – between the round shot and the barrel. Windage caused the propellant gases from the gunpowder explosion to leak out, but it also put less stress on the gun barrel. With rifled cannon, the ammunition was designed to expand the shell so that there was no windage between the projectile and the gun barrel. This meant that a smaller gunpowder charge could throw a rifled projectile farther, but it also meant that the gun barrel was put under greater stress. Bronze cannons infrequently burst because the metal was flexible. Cast iron was stronger than bronze, but it was also more rigid. This made cast iron guns more prone to burst at the breech or muzzle.

Bronze was too soft a metal for rifled guns. Cast iron was hard enough to take rifling but it was too brittle. Parrott's solution to this puzzle was a cast iron rifled cannon that had a wrought iron reinforcing band wrapped around the breech. When banded guns were manufactured, gravity acted on the bands as they cooled, making an uneven fit around the gun barrel. Parrott overcame the problem by slowly rotating the gun barrel while it was being cooled. The Parrott rifle was first developed in 1859–1860. Parrott later noted of his invention, "I do not profess to think that they are the best gun in the world, but I think they were the best practical thing that could be got at the time". The U.S. government bought the first ten 10-pounder Parrott rifles on 23 May 1861. The U.S. Ordnance Department trusted Robert Parrott to such a degree that he was allowed to be the inspecting officer until the end of 1862. This was a unique arrangement since Parrott was also the manufacturer.

== Manufacture ==
The West Point Foundry produced about 300 20-pounder Parrott rifles between September 1861 and July 1864. The gun barrels weighted between 1,635 lb (742 kg) and 1,815 lb (823 kg). The rifling consisted of five lands and grooves of right-hand gaining twist (increasing toward the muzzle) and the caliber (bore diameter) was 3.67 in (93 mm). The 20-pounder Parrott had a reinforcing band 16.25 in (41 cm) long and 1.5 in (38 mm) thick. The Register of Inspections recorded numbers 1 through 284. However, there were gaps in the record and surviving guns have been found with numbers in the gaps. Also, there is a gun at Gettysburg National Military Park with registry number 296, so it is likely that the real number of guns produced is at least 296. The cost per gun was approximately $380. A number of the guns were designed for Navy use and had a block and pin that fitted over the cascabel (end knob). Only 15 Federal-made guns are known to have survived to the present day.

The Tredegar Iron Works in the Confederacy produced 45 20-pounder Parrott rifles between August 1862 and December 1864. Like the Federal version, the guns were rifled with five grooves in a right-hand twist. The Confederate pattern differed from the Federal gun by having a reinforcing band 20 in (51 cm) long and 2 in (51 mm) thick. This resulted in the guns averaging 1,866 lb (846 kg) each, which is 51 lb (23 kg) more than the heaviest Federal pieces. The Noble Brothers & Company of Rome, Georgia contracted to manufacture 20-pounder Parrott rifles for the Confederacy, but it is not known if they were produced and none have survived. There are 14 surviving Confederate-made 20-pounder Parrott rifles of which two have markings from the Macon Arsenal and the others were made at Tredegar. The two Macon Arsenal guns have weights averaging 1,657 lb (752 kg).

== Specifications ==
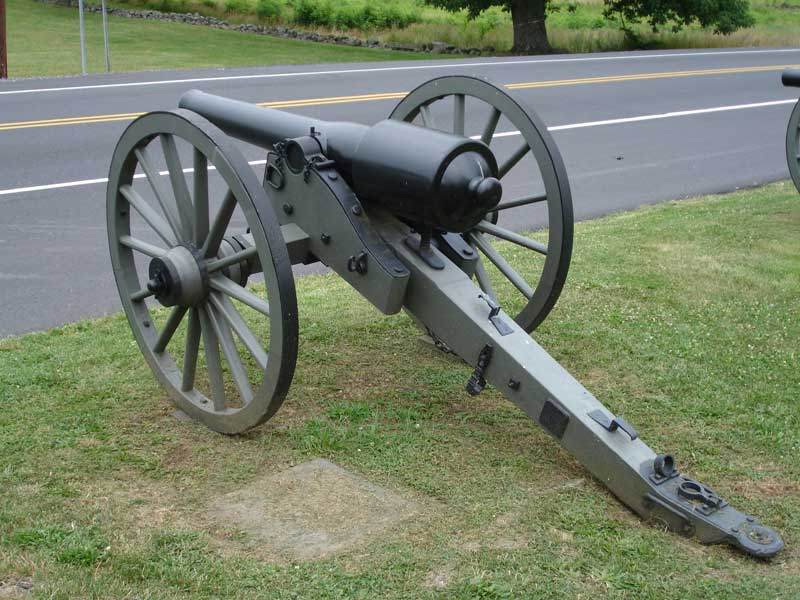
20-pounder Parrott rifle, rear view, Gettysburg NMP

The 20-pounder Parrott rifle had a bore (caliber) with a diameter of 3.67 in (93 mm) and fired a projectile weighing 20 lb (9.1 kg). Its gun barrel was 84 in (213 cm) long and weighed about 1,750 lb (794 kg). The gunpowder charge weighed 2.0 lb (0.9 kg) and fired the projectile with a muzzle velocity of 1,250 ft/s (381 m/s) to a distance of 1,900 yd (1,737 m) at 5° elevation. A smoothbore cannon's projectile usually retained only one-third of its muzzle velocity at 1,500 yd (1,372 m) and its round shot could be seen in the air. At the same distance, a rifled projectile often retained two-thirds of its muzzle velocity and was not visible while in flight. A rifled projectile only became visible if it started to tumble out of control. Tumbling occurred when the shell failed to take the grooves inside the gun barrel or when the spin wore off in flight.

Rifling allowed elongated/heavier rounds to be fired. For example, smoothbore cannons of the same 3.67 caliber as the 20-pounder Parrott fired only 6 pound round shot. For example the M1841 6-pounder field gun.

The 20-pounder Parrott rifle was mounted on the 1,175 lb (533 kg) carriage for the M1841 12-pounder field gun. The 20-pounder Parrott rifle fired case shot (shrapnel), shell, and canister shot. The use of bolts (solid shot) was rare and it was usually not provided in the ammunition chests. Firing a shell without a fuse would achieve the same result as firing a solid shot from a rifled gun. Parrott ammunition was designed to be used. The Parrott rifles could also fire Hotchkiss ammunition, but gunners were not allowed to use Schenkl ammunition. One flaw in Parrott ammunition was the position of the sabot was at the shell's base. This meant that the final impulse on the projectile as it left the gun was on its base, possibly causing the shell to wobble in flight.

When firing Canister shot rifled guns were not as effective as canister fired from a 12-pounder Napoleon or a M1841 12-pounder howitzer. First, the rifled gun's 3.67-inch bore was narrower than the 12-pounder's 4.62 in (117 mm) bore and thus could fire fewer canister balls. Second, the gun's rifling caused the canister to be thrown in an irregular pattern. Union General Henry Jackson Hunt asserted that rifled guns had a canister range only half the 400 yd (366 m) effective range of canister fired from the 12-pounder Napoleon.

Early in the war, many Union batteries were organized with six guns of identical type. However, as will be noted, batteries armed with 20-pounder Parrott rifles often had four guns. Each gun required two 6-horse teams. The first team pulled the gun and its limber and the second team pulled the caisson (ammunition wagon). Each caisson carried two ammunition chests and the limber carried one additional ammunition chest. In addition to its guns, limbers, and caissons, each battery had two additional vehicles, a supply wagon and a portable forge. The 20-pounder Parrott rifle's great weight made it difficult for a 6-horse team to pull. The guns were among the heaviest pieces that could be classified as field artillery, so few were taken along with the field armies. The 10-pounder Parrott rifle was more frequently utilized. Under normal conditions, infantry could be expected to march 15 mi (24.1 km) in six hours, while it would take an artillery battery 10 hours to march 16 mi (25.7 km).

== History ==
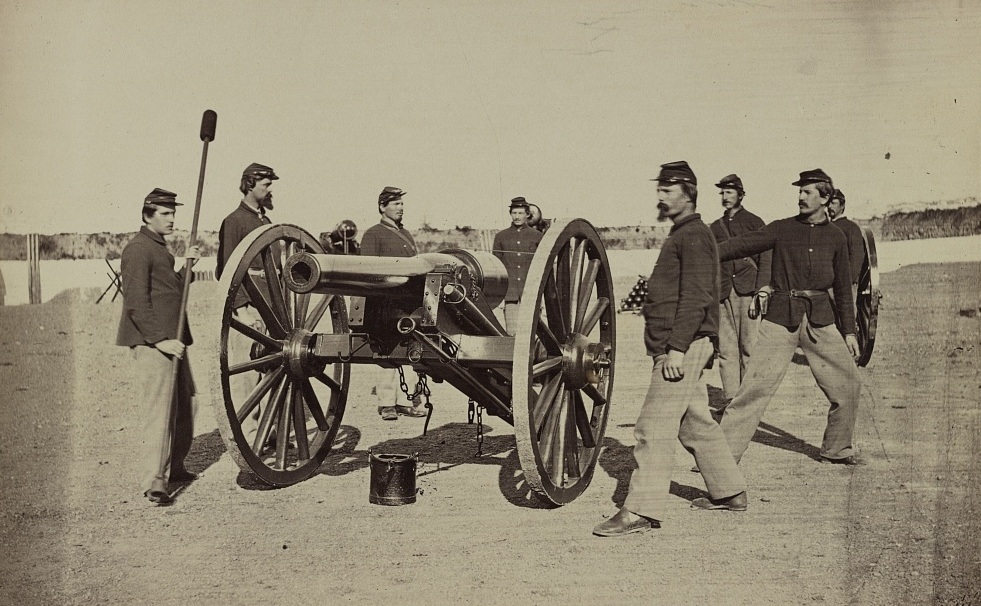
Federal gun crew from the 1st Connecticut Heavy Artillery Regiment practices with a 20-pounder Parrott rifle in the Washington D.C. defenses.

At the Battle of Antietam on 17 September 1862, the Federal Army of the Potomac employed 22 20-pounder Parrott rifles while the Confederate Army of Northern Virginia had none. The 5th New York Independent Light Artillery (Taft's) and 1st New York Light Artillery Battalion, Batteries A (Wever's), B (von Kleiser's), and C (Langner's) were all 4-gun 20-pounder Parrott batteries belonging to the V Corps. Simmonds' Battery Kentucky Light Artillery had two 20-pounder Parrott rifles, three 10-pounder Parrott rifles, and one iron 12-pounder howitzer. Simmonds' Battery and the 4-gun 20-pounder Parrott armed 2nd U.S. Artillery, Battery E (Benjamin's) served in the IX Corps. During the Battle of Fredericksburg on 13 December 1862, the 5th New York Battery and Batteries A, B, and C of the New York Battalion served in the Artillery Reserve. The Artillery Reserve was posted on the east bank of the Rappahannock River on Stafford Heights, opposite the town of Fredericksburg, Virginia.

Before the Second Battle of Corinth on 3–4 October 1862, William Rosecrans built several lunettes to defend the west side of Corinth, Mississippi. Battery Phillips was 200 yd (183 m) north of Corona Female College, Battery Williams was 400 yd (366 m) northeast of Phillips, and Battery Robinett was 200 yd (183 m) north of Williams and 675 yd (617 m) west of Corinth. Battery Williams contained 30-pounder Parrott rifles while Battery Robinett was armed with three 20-pounder Parrott rifles and manned by Company C of the 1st U.S. Infantry Regiment. On the first day, Captain Henry Richardson's Battery D, 1st Missouri Light Artillery helped repel two Confederate attacks but lost one gun. On the second day, the Confederate division led by Martin E. Green routed the division of Thomas Alfred Davies in the Union right-center, but not before the Union guns in Battery Powell inflicted serious casualties. Guarding the north side of Corinth, Battery Powell was defended by three 20-pounder Parrott rifles of Richardson's battery and two M1841 24-pounder howitzers. These guns were overrun. However, the tide turned and Federal troops recaptured the position, re-manned the guns, and fired on the retreating Confederates. In the center, Dabney H. Maury's Confederate division launched an assault on David S. Stanley's Federal division. Stanley's position was buttressed by Battery Robinett which became the focus of gallant but unsuccessful Confederate attacks. Losses on both sides were heavy.

Union General Quincy Adams Gillmore believed that Parrott rifles were as good as the best artillery despite their "unequal endurance". He wrote that the Parrotts were easy for gun crews to operate. Nevertheless, the 20-pounder Parrott rifles had many critics. Confederate General J. Johnston Pettigrew complained that a battery of four 20-pounder Parrotts proved to be worthless. He wrote that half their shells exploded almost as soon as they left the gun and many of the others wobbled in flight. Finally, one of the guns burst, killing one gunner and injuring two others. Confederate Major John Haskell wanted the 20-pounder Parrotts taken away from the Macon Light Artillery to spare its men possible injury. Union General Hunt protested that the 20-pounder Parrotts were "very unsatisfactory" because the shells were unreliable and dangerous to Federal troops. He noted that two of the guns burst at Antietam and one at Fredericksburg. Hunt tried to suppress the use of the 20-pounders in the Army of the Potomac. One of the guns of Taft's Battery (5th New York) burst at Gettysburg. Parrott rifles were not employed again after the Civil War.

== Civil War artillery ==
Characteristics of American Civil War artillery pieces
Description	Caliber	Tube length	Tube weight	Carriage weight	Shot weight	Charge weight	Range 5° elev.
M1841 6-pounder cannon	3.67 in (9.3 cm)	60 in (152 cm)	884 lb (401 kg)	900 lb (408 kg)	6.1 lb (2.8 kg)	1.25 lb (0.6 kg)	1,523 yd (1,393 m)
M1841 12-pounder cannon	4.62 in (11.7 cm)	78 in (198 cm)	1,757 lb (797 kg)	1,175 lb (533 kg)	12.3 lb (5.6 kg)	2.5 lb (1.1 kg)	1,663 yd (1,521 m)
M1841 12-pounder howitzer	4.62 in (11.7 cm)	53 in (135 cm)	788 lb (357 kg)	900 lb (408 kg)	8.9 lb (4.0 kg)	1.0 lb (0.5 kg)	1,072 yd (980 m)
M1841 24-pounder howitzer	5.82 in (14.8 cm)	65 in (165 cm)	1,318 lb (598 kg)	1,128 lb (512 kg)	18.4 lb (8.3 kg)	2.0 lb (0.9 kg)	1,322 yd (1,209 m)
M1857 12-pounder Napoleon	4.62 in (11.7 cm)	66 in (168 cm)	1,227 lb (557 kg)	1,128 lb (512 kg)	12.3 lb (5.6 kg)	2.5 lb (1.1 kg)	1,619 yd (1,480 m)
12-pounder James rifle	3.67 in (9.3 cm)	60 in (152 cm)	875 lb (397 kg)	900 lb (408 kg)	12 lb (5.4 kg)	0.75 lb (0.3 kg)	1,700 yd (1,554 m)
3-inch Ordnance rifle	3.0 in (7.6 cm)	69 in (175 cm)	820 lb (372 kg)	900 lb (408 kg)	9.5 lb (4.3 kg)	1.0 lb (0.5 kg)	1,830 yd (1,673 m)
10-pounder Parrott rifle	3.0 in (7.6 cm)	74 in (188 cm)	899 lb (408 kg)	900 lb (408 kg)	9.5 lb (4.3 kg)	1.0 lb (0.5 kg)	1,900 yd (1,737 m)
20-pounder Parrott rifle	3.67 in (9.3 cm)	84 in (213 cm)	1,750 lb (794 kg)	1,175 lb (533 kg)	20 lb (9.1 kg)	2.0 lb (0.9 kg)	1,900 yd (1,737 m)
