= 1st Massachusetts Battery =

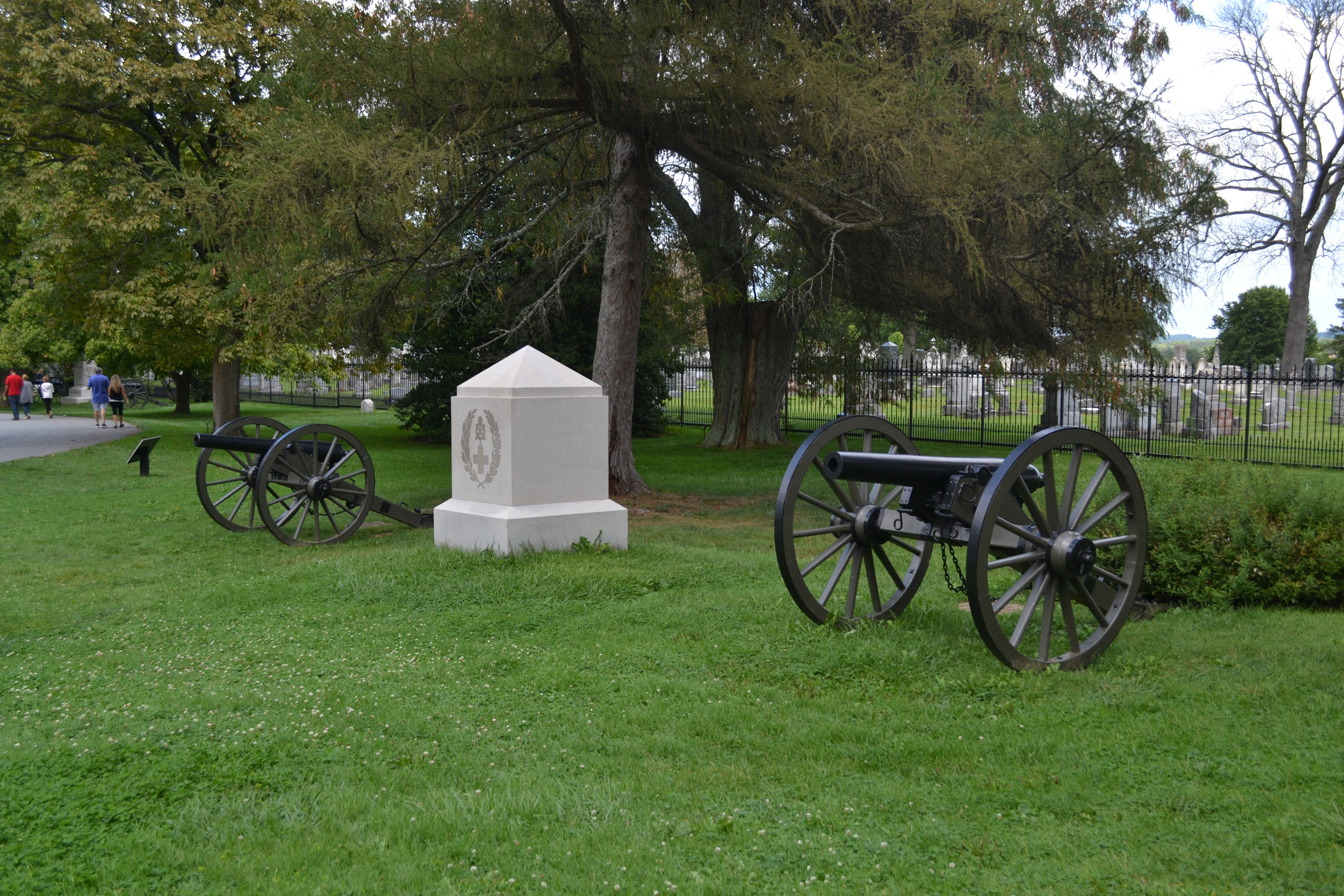
- 1st Massachusetts Battery monument on Cemetery Hill, Gettysburg National Battlefield Park
- Active: April 20, 1861 – August 2, 1861; August 28, 1861 – October 19, 1864
- Country: United States
- Branch: Union Army
- Type: Field artillery
- Size: Battery
- Part of: In 1863: Artillery brigade (Tompkins), First Division (Brooks), VI Corps

Commanders
- 1st: Captain Asa M. Cook
- 2nd: Capt. William H. McCartney

The 1st Massachusetts Battery (or 1st Battery, Massachusetts Light Artillery) was a peacetime militia artillery battery that was activated for federal service in the Union army for two separate tours during the American Civil War. Prior to the war and during its first term of service, the unit was sometimes known as "Cook's Battery" after its commanding officer, Capt. Asa M. Cook. During its first term, the battery primarily served garrison duty in Baltimore, Maryland. Almost immediately after mustering out, the unit began preparing for a second term, this time volunteering to serve for three years. The battery was attached to the VI Corps of the Army of the Potomac during its second term and took part in some of the largest battles of the war including the Fredericksburg, Chancellorsville, Gettysburg, and Lieutenant General Ulysses S. Grant's Overland Campaign in the spring of 1864.

== Service details ==
=== First term of service ===
The 1st Massachusetts Battery was one of the Massachusetts militia units which responded to President Abraham Lincoln's call for 75,000 volunteer troops to serve a term of 90 days at the start of the war. Due to the fact that these first units were en route to Washington on April 19 (the anniversary of the Battles of Lexington and Concord), in Massachusetts these 90 day troops are often known as the "Minutemen of '61." The battery was organized for active duty on April 20 though it was not mustered into federal service until May 18 near Baltimore, Maryland. The battery left Massachusetts for Fort Monroe, Virginia on April 21, 1861 and arrived on April 23. From there they moved to the Naval Academy in Annapolis, Maryland and were quartered there until May 4. They were assigned to garrison a key railroad relay station 15 miles outside of Baltimore in Elkridge, Maryland. Here they were officially mustered into United States service. They later moved to Camp Clare near Baltimore and then were stationed at Monument Square in Baltimore where they served garrison duty until August 2. On that date they were mustered out and returned home to Massachusetts.

=== Second term of service ===
The unit re-organized for a second term of service at Camp Cameron in Cambridge, Massachusetts on August 27, 1861. They departed for Washington on October 3 and were attached to Brigadier General William B. Franklin's division, part of the Army of the Potomac until March 1862. This division became part of the newly organized VI Corps in March and the battery remained attached to the First Division until June 1863. At that point they were attached to the Artillery Brigade of the VI Corps of the Army of the Potomac with which they remained associated until the end of their service in October 1864.

The battery served in the defenses of Washington until March 1862 when they advanced with other units towards Manassas Junction from March 10–15. They were part of Major General Irwin McDowell's advance on Fredericksburg, Virginia from April 4–12. They became part of Maj. Gen. George McClellan's Peninsular Campaign in April. The battery was present for the Siege of Yorktown from April 23 to May 4. They were engaged in the Seven Days Battles near Richmond from June 25 to July 1. The battery remained at Harrison's Landing until August 16 when the Army of the Potomac withdrew from the Virginia Peninsula. They played a role in covering the retreat of the Union Army of Virginia after the Second Battle of Bull Run on August 30 and September 1. When Maj. Gen. McClellan pursued Gen. Robert E. Lee's forces into Maryland, the 1st Massachusetts Battery joined the Maryland Campaign. They were engaged at Crampton's Gap on September 14 and the Battle of Antietam on September 16 and 17. The battery was stationed at Downsville, Maryland until October 29. They moved to Falmouth, Virginia with the rest of the Army of the Potomac from October 29 to November 19. They were engaged in the Battle of Fredericksburg from December 11–15.

During the winter of 1862 to 1863 they participated in the Mud March, a failed attempt to engage Lee's army in January 1863, and then were stationed at White Oak Church in Virginia until the end of April. During the Chancellorsville Campaign, the battery was engaged at the Second Battle of Fredericksburg on May 3. They took part in operations at Franklin's Crossing from June 5–13. During Lee's invasion of Pennsylvania, the 1st Massachusetts Battery participated in the Battle of Gettysburg on July 2–3, being stationed on Cemetery Hill. After the close of the campaign, the battery encamped at Warrenton, Virginia until September 15 and then Stone House Mountain until October 5. They participated in the Mine Run Campaign from November 26 to December 2 and then encamped at Brandy Station, Virginia until May 1864.

At the commencement of Grant's Overland Campaign in May, the battery was not engaged during the Battle of the Wilderness but took part in several of the battles that followed, including the Battle of Spotsylvania Court House from May 8–12, the Battle of North Anna from May 22–26, the Battle of Totopotomoy Creek from May 28–31, and the Battle of Cold Harbor on June 1. They were engaged during the Second Battle of Petersburg and the beginning of the Siege of Petersburg from June 17 to July 9. The battery was pulled back to Washington on July 9 in response to the Confederate advance on the capital and participated in the repulse of Confederate forces during the Battle of Fort Stevens on July 12. In August, the battery was detached to participate in Maj. Gen. Philip Sheridan's Valley Campaigns of 1864 and were engaged during the Battle of Opequon on September 19 and Battle of Fisher's Hill on September 22.

With the expiration of their term of service, the battery traveled to Boston from October 2–12. They were mustered out on October 19, 1864. The unit lost six men killed or mortally wounded and 15 men by disease.

== See also ==
- Massachusetts in the Civil War
- List of Massachusetts Civil War units
- 8th Massachusetts Battery - another unit commanded by Asa Cook
