= Samuel Nicoll Benjamin =

Union Artillery Officer

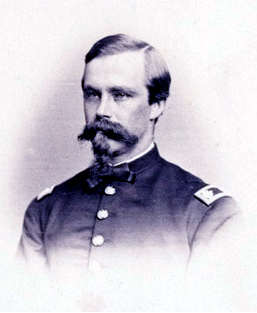
- Samuel Nicoll Benjamin
- Born: January 3, 1839; New York City, US
- Died: May 15, 1886 (aged 47) Governors Island, New York, US
- Allegiance: United States; Union
- Branch: US Army; Union Army
- Service years: 1861 - 1886
- Rank: Major; Brevet Lieutenant Colonel
- Commands: Battery E, 2nd U.S. Artillery; Chief of Artillery, IX Corps; Battery F, 2nd U.S. Artillery; Battery K, 2nd U.S. Artillery
- Conflicts: American Civil War: • Battle of Blackburn's Ford • First Battle of Bull Run • Peninsular Campaign • Northern Virginia Campaign • Maryland Campaign • Battle of Fredericksburg • Vicksburg Campaign • East Tennessee Campaign • Overland Campaign • Battle of the Wilderness • Battle of Spotsylvania Court House (WIA)
- Awards: Medal of Honor

Samuel Nicoll Benjamin (January 3, 1839 – May 15, 1886) was a Union Army artillery officer during the American Civil War who was a recipient of the Medal of Honor.

== Early life ==
Benjamin was born on January 3, 1839, in New York City. He was the son of William Massena Benjamin (1800–1862) and Sarah Jane (née Turk) Benjamin (1805–1903). His siblings included Edith Massena Benjamin, Sarah Josephine Benjamin Arnold, and Laura Gertrude Benjamin Brooks.

Benjamin graduated from the United States Military Academy at West Point, ranked 12th of 45 cadets in the Class of May 6, 1861.

== Career ==
Upon his graduation from the United States Military Academy, Benjamin was commissioned as a second lieutenant attached to Battery I, 2nd U.S. Artillery. Less than two weeks later, he was advanced in grade to the rank of first lieutenant and transferred to Battery E, 2nd U.S. under the command of Captain Josiah H. Carlisle. Lieutenant Benjamin joined his company in the defenses of Washington, D.C., at Fort Corcoran, Virginia, in July 1861 during the American Civil War.

Present with Battery E, Benjamin was engaged at the Battle of Blackburn's Ford, the First Battle of Bull Run, the Peninsular Campaign, the Northern Virginia Campaign, the Maryland Campaign, the Battle of Fredericksburg, the Vicksburg Campaign, the East Tennessee Campaign, and the Overland Campaign, including both the Battle of the Wilderness and the Battle of Spotsylvania Court House, where he was wounded in action.

In August 1862, Captain Carlisle began an extended sick leave of absence; Lieutenant Benjamin assumed command of Battery E, with occasional absences, until December 1863.

In 1864, Benjamin was promoted to the captaincy of Battery F, 2nd U.S. Artillery, but did not join his company until after the war. While serving as Chief of Artillery for the Union IX Corps during the Overland Campaign, he was severely wounded in action and hospitalized for four months. Upon his discharge from the hospital in September 1864, Captain Benjamin spent the duration of the war as an assistant professor of mathematics at West Point.

Following the Civil War, Benjamin remained commander of Battery F until 1869, and then Battery K, 2nd U.S. Artillery, until he was promoted to major in the Adjutant General Corps in March 1875.

Benjamin died while on active duty at Governor’s Island, New York, in May 1886.

=== Medal of Honor citation ===
Major Benjamin was presented with the Medal of Honor on June 11, 1877, for his service from Bull Run to Spotsylvania, Virginia. over the period from July 1861 to May 1864. The citation stated: "Particularly distinguished services as an artillery officer."

== Personal life ==
Benjamin was married to Julia Kean Fish (1841–1908). Julia was the daughter of Governor of New York, U.S. Senator, and U.S. Secretary of State Hamilton Fish (1808–1893) and Julia Ursin Niemcewiez Kean (1816–1887). (Note: Julia was the sister of John Kean and granddaughter of John Kean and Susan Livingston Kean. Her grandmother Susan married Count Julian Ursyn Niemcewicz after her grandfather's death.) She was also the sister of Nicholas Fish II, Hamilton Fish II, and Stuyvesant Fish. Together, they were the parents of:

- Elizabeth d'Hauteville Benjamin (1871–1884), who died young.
- William Massena Benjamin (1874–1928), who married Charlotte Hoffman Prime (1881–1969), the great-granddaughter of Nathaniel Prime, in 1903.
- Hamilton Fish Benjamin (1877–1938), a twin who married Emily Low Bacon (1884–1960) in 1909. (Note: After their divorce in 1923, she remarried to Halstead Camp Lindsley (1880–1945), the former husband of Margaret Ashton Stimson Lindsley, in 1923.) They divorced in 1923 and he married Ruth Wolfe (1890–1984), (Note: After his death, his widow married Dr. Stuart Neville Michaux (1878–1950) in 1940.) in 1932.
- Julian Arnold Benjamin (1877–1953), a twin.

He died on May 15, 1886, while on duty serving in the Department of the East.

=== Descendants ===
Through his son William, he was the grandfather of Charlotte Prime Benjamin, (1904–2002), who married Richard Morris Carver in 1925; Elizabeth Fish Benjamin (1906–1976), who married William McLane in 1928; Julia Kean Benjamin (1908–1983); William Hoffman Benjamin (1910–1997); Emily Stuyvesant Benjamin (1913–2000); Samuel Nicoll Benjamin (1915–2006); Mary Benjamin; Sarah Morris Benjamin; and Hamilton Fish Benjamin II (1921–1984).

== See also ==
- List of Medal of Honor recipients
- List of American Civil War Medal of Honor recipients
