= Lorna Lindsley =

American journalist (1889–1956)

Margaret Ashton Stimson Lindsley (2 January 1889 – 12 July 1956), known professionally as Lorna Lindsley, was a journalist, war correspondent, and author of the book, War Is People (Houghton Mifflin, 1945). The Saturday Review noted that her book told “the epic of endurance and courage in a fight which sometimes looks heroic, but more often proves to be only burdensome and cruel; which is not reported in the official war communiqués but represents an essential part of the great struggle of our times.”

== Biography ==
Lorna Lindsley was born on 2 January 1889 to Frederic Jesup Stimson (1855–1943) and Elizabeth Bradlee Abbot Stimson (1858–1896) in Dedham, Massachusetts. She was the younger of two daughters.

Her father was U.S. ambassador to Argentina from 1915 to 1921, and author of several law books, including The American Constitution (1908) and Popular Law-making (1910), as well as novels and short stories.

Lorna Lindsley attended Radcliffe College and in 1909 married mining engineer Halstead Camp Lindsley (1880–1945). The couple had two daughters, Leonora (1917–1945) and Joan (1913–1971) before divorcing in 1921.

Lorna moved to Paris in the 1920s, where she took an apartment at 20 rue de Cels in Montparnasse and became part of the circle of expatriate Americans living in the city. In the early 1930s, she crossed the Atlantic from Majorca to Boston in a sailing ship, named the Wander Bird. In 1935, she co-wrote a play about Lord Byron with Gilbert Seldes called The Marble Heart, but it does not appear to have been staged.

In 1936, Lorna and her daughter Leonora journeyed from Auckland, New Zealand, to Tahiti aboard the sailing ship Joseph Conrad under the command of Alan Villiers. Although he never mentions their presence in the book he wrote about the voyage (Cruise of the Conrad, Scribner's, 1937), he wrote about them in his diary, portions of which are quoted in his biography.

Lorna Lindsley began to write articles for American newspapers in the late 1930s, including the Manchester Guardian, the New Statesman, the Nation (U.K.), Time and Tide, the Christian Science Monitor, and the New York Herald Tribune.

In 1938, she travelled to Spain during the Spanish Civil War to report on the fate of the Loyalist forces for a French newspaper. After leaving Spain, she travelled to Palestine and wrote about the struggles of the Zionists there. At the outbreak of the Second World War, she was in France and aided the earliest Resistance efforts, before returning to the United States in 1941. These experiences formed the basis of her book, War Is People. Many of its chapters had previously appeared in print as newspaper articles.

After the war, she continued to travel, including visiting Kenya to learn about the Mau Mau Uprising. She died in New York City on 12 July 1956, of a cerebral hemorrhage, at the age of 67.

== Endowment ==
Lorna’s daughter Leonora Lindsley was killed in an accident in Germany a few days before the end of the Second World War. She had been a member of the Rochambelles, the only female combat unit on the Western Front during the Second World War, and was posthumously awarded the French Croix de Guerre avec Palme. In her memory, Lorna Lindsley gave $50,000 to the Institute of International Education. The funds were to be used to allow French students to study in the United States.

== War Is People ==
War Is People was published in 1943 by Houghton Mifflin. Rafael Medoff has written of Lorna Lindsley: “It was when civil war erupted in Spain in 1936 that Lindsley found her true calling. Attaching herself to the Republican (anti-fascist) forces, she wrote a series of pro-Republican articles for US newspapers and political magazines. Lindsley did not pretend to be an objective reporter. In between articles, she served as a nurse to wounded Republican soldiers and wrote letters home for those too badly injured to hold a pen. After Franco’s triumph, she returned to Paris. In the spring of 1940, with the German army approaching, more than one million of the city’s residents fled. Lindsley too left – but only for a few days, to smuggle out film footage of the invasion. Three days later, she was back in the French capital. For the next five months, Lindsley defied the terror of the Nazi regime to help smuggle Jewish and political refugees out of the city. Her reports from within the German zone became an important source of eyewitness information for the American and British press. After returning to the United States in 1941, she wrote her first and only book, War Is People, which described the impact of war on the lives of ordinary citizens.”
