= 1st Connecticut Light Artillery Battery =

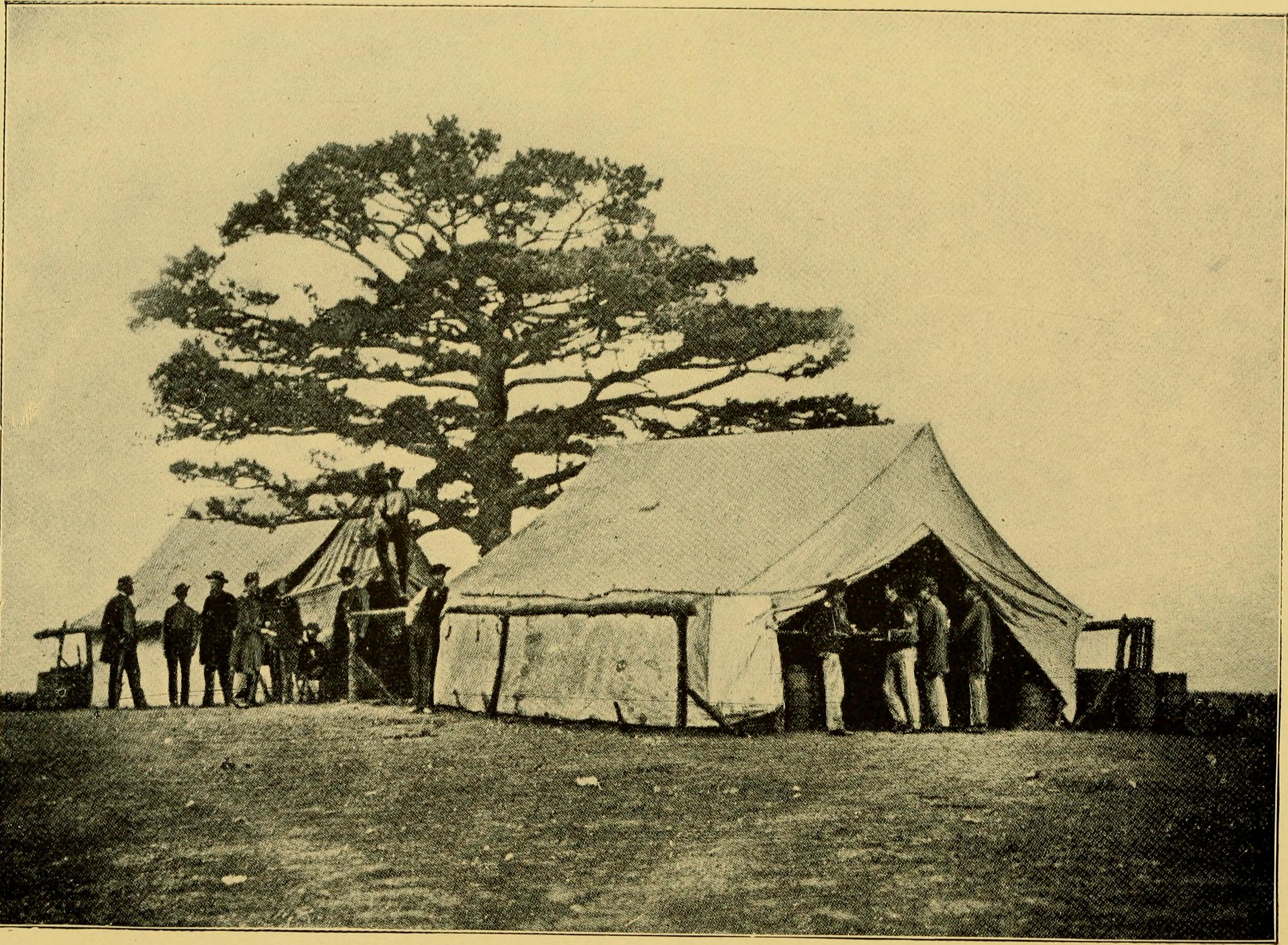
- Active: October 26, 1861 – June 11, 1865
- Disbanded: June 11, 1865
- Country: United States
- Allegiance: Union
- Branch: Artillery
- Size: Battery
- Equipment: 3.8-inch James Rifles; 12-pound Napoleons (Note: The exact number of Napoleons the 1st Connecticut Light Artillery Battery had in its possession during the American Civil War is unknown.)
- Engagements: American Civil War: Battle of Secessionville; Battle of St. Johns Bluff; Battle of Grimball's Landing; Battle of Chester Station; Battle of Proctor's Creek; Siege of Petersburg; Second Battle of Deep Bottom; Battle of Chaffin's Farm; Appomattox Campaign

Commanders
- Captain: Alfred P. Rockwell
- Captain: James B. Clinton

The 1st Connecticut Light Artillery Battery, recruited from the state of Connecticut, served in the Union Army between October 26, 1861, and June 11, 1865, during the American Civil War.

== Service ==
The 1st Connecticut Light Artillery Battery, under the command of Captains Alfred P. Rockwell and James B. Clinton, was organized in October 1861, and recruited from the state of Connecticut. The members joined at Meriden (Hanover village) and were mustered, for three years, into U.S. service on October 26, 1861.

The battery consisting of 156 men, embarked for New York on January 13, 1862, leaving there on the 21st on the Ellwood Walter for Port Royal, South Carolina, and arriving at Beaufort, South Carolina February 6. The battery was drilled in artillery tactics during the next three months and saw its first actual service at Pocotaligo. During General David Hunter's movement in June against Charleston, the battery took an active part, receiving honorable mention in General Orders for good conduct and for well served guns. The left section of the battery shared in an expedition to Florida in September and October, 1862, and was active at Fort Finnegan.

During the second movement against Charleston in April 1863, the battery was present but not actively engaged and shortly after returned to Beaufort. An expedition, commanded by Lieutenant Clinton, to destroy the railroad bridge above Willstown. This resulted in the loss of two of its guns through the grounding of the steamer, the guns being sunk in the river to prevent their capture. In July, the battery was engaged on James Island and was complimented by General Alfred Terry. Following this the battery was ordered to Folly Island and for nine months it formed part of the reserve under General Quincy Adams Gillmore. In December, 1863, while stationed at Folly Island, forty-six men reenlisted for another three-year term.

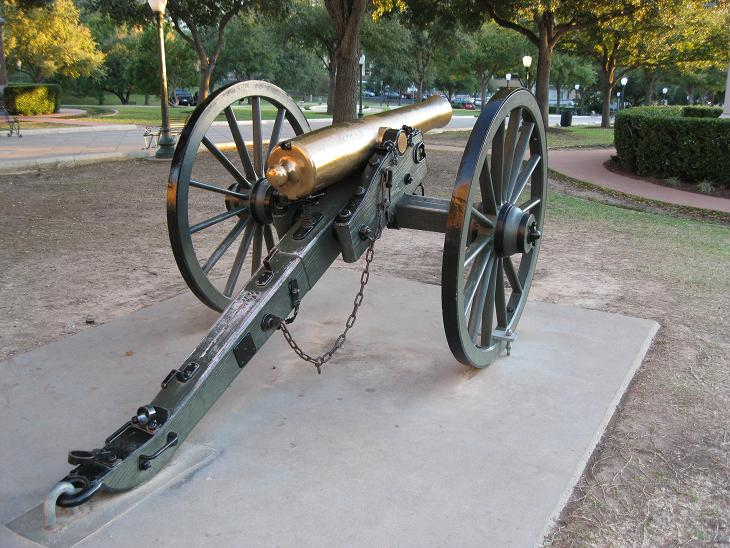
12-pound Napoleon, 1864

On April 18, 1864, the battery embarked for Fort Monroe from where it proceeded to Gloucester Point and on May 4, it joined General Benjamin Butler's forces at Bermuda Hundred. It was actively engaged at Chester Station on the Richmond and Petersburg turnpike and at Proctor's Creek, losing two killed and ten wounded among the former being Lieutenant George Metcalfe. They then returned to Bermuda Hundred until June 27, taking an active part in the actions at Grovert's House and at Ware Bottom Church. Following the affair at Deep Bottom in August it was almost constantly engaged before moving to Petersburg on September 23. It then moved across the James River to a point near Fort Harrison. Following this it was assigned to the light artillery brigade of XXV Corps under General Godfrey Weitzel.

It was active at Chaffin's Bluff and Johnson's Farm in October. Following this it was ordered to City Point, where it exchanged its James Rifles for 12-pound Napoleons due to a shortage of ammunition for the former. The unit was comparatively inactive during the winter of 1864–1865. But on April 3, 1865, the Confederates abandoned their defences and the battery entered Richmond with the XXV Corps, where they received news of Lee's surrender. The unit continued to serve in the vicinity of Richmond until June 11, when it was mustered out at Manchester, Richmond. It started for home the following day and reached New Haven on June 14. The battery was the first of the veteran troops to return to Connecticut. Having been in service three years and eight months, it participated in about twenty engagements.

== Casualties ==
The battery started out with one-hundred and fifty-six men, forty-six of whom had reenlisted and altogether received about one-hundred and forty recruits. Its casualty list consisted of two killed, eighteen wounded, two accidentally wounded, twenty died of disease, and four discharged for disability.

== See also ==
- List of Connecticut Civil War units
