= Armed-forces artificer =

An artificer is an appointment held by a member of an armed forces service who is skilled at working on electronic, electrical, electro-mechanical and/or mechanical devices. The specific term "artificer" for this function is typical of the armed forces of countries that are or have been in the British Commonwealth and refers to a Senior Non-Commissioned Officer. Artificer is a job title and not a rank.

Qualification to hold the position and title of Artificer requires years of training and service in order to gain the experience and rank required. In the British Forces, soldiers in the Royal Electrical and Mechanical Engineers (REME) or Royal Marines with the rank of Sergeant who have also qualified as Class 1 tradesmen are eligible for consideration for the Artificers course. Upon completion of the 18-month Artificers course, soldiers are promoted to Staff Sergeant (one rank above Sergeant in the British Army) and presented with the Artificers badge. They are also awarded a HND/Degree. Artificers are addressed as Tiff or 'The Tiffy', and may oversee the maintenance and repair of a unit's mechanical equipment, help to develop new equipment, or become further qualified on specific equipment.

Corps of Artificers served during the American Revolution and American Civil Wars. The rank of Artificer (abbreviated Art.), was also used in the United States army during the American Indian Wars.

Examples include:

- Artificer Sergeant Major, an appointment held by a Warrant Officer Class 1 in the Corps of Royal Electrical and Mechanical Engineers. A Warrant Officer Artificer may be further trained in additional skills, e.g. from Radio Mechanic to include Radar, Computers and other electronic equipment.
- A soldier of the Royal Electrical and Mechanical Engineers selected for special electro-mechanical training and rapid promotion to the rank of Staff Sergeant
- Royal Artificers, a corps of the British army which in 1813 became the Royal Sappers and Miners, which in 1856 merged into the Royal Engineers
- Armament Artificer, an Appointment by suitability qualified NCO technicians in the ordnance corps of the Irish Defence Forces who inspect, service and repair heavy ordnance weapons in artillery, air defence, Cavalry and Naval formations
- Royal Navy Artificer, a highly-skilled naval rating who has successfully undergone a five-year formal apprenticeship in skill-of-hand and specialist knowledge training in His Majesty's ships and training establishments, a position which ceased in 2010 as a result of engineering branch restructuring.
