= Battle of Tupelo order of battle: Union =

The following Union army units and commanders fought in the Battle of Tupelo, July 14-15, 1864, during the American Civil War. The Confederate order of battle is listed separately.

== Abbreviations used ==
=== Military Rank ===
- MG = Major General
- BG = Brigadier General
- Col = Colonel
- Ltc = Lieutenant Colonel
- Maj = Major
- Cpt = Captain
- Lt = 1st Lieutenant

=== Other ===
- w = wounded
- mw = mortally wounded
- k = killed

== Right Wing, 16th Army Corps ==
MG Andrew Jackson Smith, Commanding

Division	Brigade	Regiments and Others
First Division; BG Joseph Mower	First Brigade Col. William L. McMillen	114th Illinois, Capt. B.C. Berry (w); 93rd Indiana, Capt. C.A. Hubbard; 10th Minnesota, Lt. Col. Samuel P. Jennison; 72nd Ohio, Maj. E. A. Rawson (mw); 95th Ohio, Lt. Col. J. Brumback; Battery E, 1st Illinois Light Artillery Regiment, Lt. Orrin W. Cram
First Division; BG Joseph Mower	Second Brigade Col. Alexander Wilkin (k); Col. John D. McClure	47th Illinois; 5th Minnesota (detachment); 9th Minnesota, Lt. Col. Josiah F. Marsh; 11th Missouri; 8th Wisconsin; Iowa Light Artillery, 2nd Battery, Lt. Joseph Rea Reed
First Division; BG Joseph Mower	Third Brigade Col. Joseph J. Woods	12th Iowa, Lt. Col. John H. Stibbs; 35th Iowa, Col. Sylvester G. Hill; 7th Minnesota, Col. William R. Marshall; 33rd Missouri, Lt. Col. William H. Heath
First Division; BG Joseph Mower	Fourth Brigade Col. Lyman M. Ward	41st Illinois (detachment), Lt. Wilson; 14th Wisconsin, Lt. Col. James W. Polleys; 33rd Wisconsin, Lt. Col. F. S. Lovell; 6th Independent Battery Indiana Light Artillery; Battery M, 1st Missouri Light Artillery Regiment, Cpt. Mueller
Third Division; Col. David Moore	First Brigade Col. Charles D. Murray	58th Illinois, Cpt. Heelan; 119th Illinois, Col. Thomas J. Kinney; 122nd Illinois, Col. J. I. Rinaker; 89th Indiana, Lt. Col. Craven; 21st Missouri, Col. Edwin Moore; 9th Independent Battery Indiana Light Artillery
Third Division; Col. David Moore	Second Brigade; Col. James I. Gilbert	14th Iowa, Cpt. William J. Campbell; 27th Iowa, Cpt. Amos M. Haslip; 32nd Iowa, Maj. Jonathan Hutchinson; 24th Missouri, Maj. Robert W. Fyan; 3rd Independent Battery Indiana Light Artillery, Lt. Richard Burns
Third Division; Col. David Moore	Third Brigade; Col. Edward H. Wolfe	49th Illinois; 117th Illinois, Col. Risdon M. Moore; 52nd Indiana, Lt. Col. Zalmon S. Main; 178th New York, Cpt. George F. Young; Battery G, 2nd Illinois Light Artillery Regiment, Lt. John W. Lowell; 14th Independent Battery Indiana Light Artillery
United States Colored Troops	First Brigade Col. Edward Bouton	59th US Colored Infantry, Maj. James C. Foster; 61st US Colored Infantry, Col. F. A. Kendrick; 68th US Colored Infantry, Col. J. B. Jones; 2nd US Colored Light Artillery, Battery I, Cpt. Louis B. Smith
Cavalry Division; BG Benjamin Grierson	Second Brigade Col. Edward F. Winslow	3rd Iowa, Lt. Col. John W. Noble; 4th Iowa, Lt. Col. John H. Peters; 10th Missouri, Maj. Martin H. Williams; Battery K, 1st Illinois Light Artillery Regiment
Cavalry Division; BG Benjamin Grierson	Third Brigade; Col. Datus E.Coon	3rd Illinois (detachment); 7th Illinois (detachment); 9th Illinois, Lt. Col. Henry B. Burgh; 2nd Iowa, Maj. Charles C. Horton
Cavalry Division; BG Benjamin Grierson	Unassigned	7th Kansas, Col. Thomas P. Herrick

== See also ==
- List of orders of battle
