= 22nd (Barteau's) Tennessee Cavalry Regiment =

Cavalry regiment of the Confederate States Army

22nd Tennessee Cavalry Regiment
- Active: 1862–1865
- Disbanded: May 4, 1865
- Country: Confederate States
- Allegiance: Tennessee
- Branch: Army
- Type: Cavalry
- Size: Regiment
- Nickname: "Barteau's regiment"
- Facings: Yellow
- Battles: American Civil War; Battle of Iuka; Second Battle of Corinth; Battle of Vincent’s Cross Roads; Battle of Brice's Cross Roads; Battle of Fort Pillow; Battle of Tupelo

Commanders
- Commanding officers: Col. Clark R. Barteau

The 22nd Tennessee Cavalry Regiment, also known as "Barteau's regiment" or the 2nd Tennessee Cavalry Regiment, was a cavalry formation of the Confederate States Army in the Western Theater of the American Civil War first commanded by Col. Clark R. Barteau.

Earlier, in May, 1862, the 4th Battalion Tennessee Cavalry (Branner's) and the 5th Battalion Tennessee Cavalry (McClellan's) were consolidated as the 2nd Tennessee Cavalry under Col. Henry Marshall Ashby. To avoid confusion, these two units were referred to as the 2nd Tennessee (Ashby's) Cavalry and the 2nd Tennessee (Barteau's) Cavalry.

At approximately the same time that Ashby's and Barteau's regiments became parts of the Confederate forces, another 2nd Tennessee Cavalry Regiment was organized within the Union Army. It was designated as the 2nd Regiment Tennessee Volunteer Cavalry and was also known as the 2nd East Tennessee Cavalry since it was composed of men from the eastern portion of the state. The exact date it was organised is unknown, because its muster rolls were destroyed at Nolensville, Tennessee on December 30, 1862.

== Formation ==
The unit was organized in June 1862 by Brig.-Gen. William Beall. It was reorganized in June 1863 by Brig.-Gen. Daniel Ruggles, who added three more companies, and reinforced again on May 10, 1864 by Brig.-Gen. Abraham Buford. The unit was consolidated with the 21st Cavalry, which was commanded by Col. Andrew N. Wilson, in February 1865 by the Confederate States War Department.

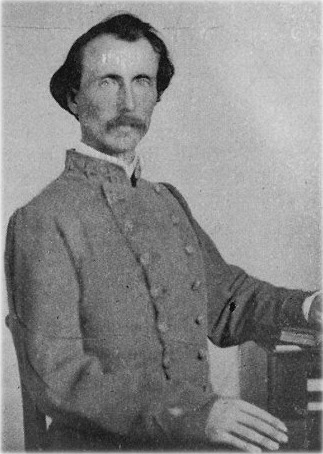
Clark R. Barteau in uniform, c. 1862

Col. Clark R. Barteau left the following undated account of the confusion around the organization of his regiment: "I have stated that the regiment was organized June 6, 1863, but it is almost impossible to determine what is the proper date. It was organized and designated as the 2nd Tennessee Cavalry Regiment by Brigadier General Beall, June 13, 1862, with seven companies present, and three (not known) which he had ordered to report to it. He was immediately relieved of the cavalry command, the three companies did not report, and the regiment remained with seven companies until June 6, 1863, when three companies were added to it by Brigadier General Ruggles. I dated the organization of the regiment from this period, for the three companies (Captain Gurthay’s Alabama Company, Captain Carpenter’s Mississippi Company, and Captain Morphis’s Tennessee Company, which were added by General Ruggles) did not report until the Alabama Company was again transferred by Brigadier General Ferguson to Colonel Boyle’s Alabama Regiment, and the other two companies, which were operating near the Tennessee-Mississippi line, were allowed to go into other commands (during the time I was not in command of the regiment from July 12, 1863 until December 16). The regiment is not officially known at Richmond; no appointments have been made to it from the War Department. The original order of the organization was not forwarded by General Beall. He was captured at Port Hudson, and the original muster rolls, as well as the original order has been lost. No record of the organization of June 13, 1862 exists. At that time no organization less than a regiment could be received at Richmond. Captain N. Oswell dropped from (report torn) by order Brigadier General Ferguson and not yet returned from West.

To this may be added the information that the original seven companies were a consolidation of 1st (MeNairy’s) Battalion and 7th (Bennett’s) Battalion (q.v.) In May, 1864, Brigadier General A. Buford assigned three more companies to complete the regiment, and finally on February 15, 1865, the War Department directed: “The organization of Barteau’s Tennessee Cavalry Regiment made by the addition of the companies commanded by Captain 0. B. Fans, S. H. Reeves and B. Edwards by order of Brigadier General A. Buford is hereby confirmed to date from the 10th day of May, 1864. It will be known as the 22nd Tennessee Cavalry Regiment.”

=== Field Officers ===
The field officers were Colonel Clark R. Barteau, Lieutenant Colonel George H. Morton, Lieutenant Colonel Thomas E. Davis, Majors William Parrish, and O. B. Farris.

=== Company officers ===
The captains were:

- Nicholas Oswell, from Company A. This was a consolidation of Companies A and B, McNairy's Battalion.
- William Parrish (to major), Thomas B. Underwood, from Company B. This was a consolidation of Companies C and D, McNairy's Battalion.
- Moses W. McKnight, from Company C. This was formerly Company E, McNairy's Battalion.
- W. T. Rickman, from Company D. This was a consolidation of Companies A and C, 7th Battalion.
- Christopher L. Bennett, William A. DeBow, from Company E. This was formerly Company B, 7th Battalion.
- Micajah Griffin, John A. Brinkley, from Company F. This was formerly company D, 7th Battalion.
- Thomas Puryear, Jonathan M. Eastes, from Company G. This was a consolidation of companies E and F, 7th Battalion.

These were the original seven companies.

A. J. Guttery, 1st Co. "H". An Alabama company assigned June 6, 1863, and assigned to 56th Alabama Cavalry Regiment as Co. "L". No muster rolls of this regiment were found for Carpenter's and Morphis's companies. Morphis's Company served as 2nd Co. "I", 15th (Stewart's) Tennessee Cavalry (1st organization), and later in the 3rd (Forrest's Old) Regiment.

B. Edwards, 2nd Co. "H". Men from Gibson, Obion and Weakley Counties. Samuel H. Reeves, Co. "I". Organized December 1, 1863, at Newbern, Dyer County of men from Gibson and Obion County. Oliver B. Farris, Co. "K". Organized December 1, 1863, at Newbern, Dyer County of men from Obion County. Barteau served as lieutenant colonel until June, 1863, when he was appointed colonel. Parrish resigned in April, 1864, and Captain B. Farris succeeded him as major.

== History ==
The regiment was stationed in North Mississippi for most of the war. A report from Company A, dated October 30, 1862, at Guntown, Mississippi, said: "It has from constant service been so reduced until at the present it is totally unfit for duty. It has changed commanders so often it is almost totally devoid of discipline." Other company reports told of constant outpost duty, scouting and picketing, and also of being with Brigadier General Frank Armstrong on his raid into West Tennessee beginning August 22, 1862, with engagements at Medon Station, September 1, Britton's Lane and Denmark, September 21, 1862. After this expedition, the regiment was with Brigadier General Sterling Price in the campaign around Iuka and Corinth, Mississippi, in October 1862.

On January 31, 1863, the regiment was ported in Brigadier General Daniel Ruggles' 1st Mississippi District; and on March 6, General Ruggles, in reporting on the condition of his forces, said: "Lieutenant Colonel Barteau's troops are miserably armed, deficient in numbers, with not even ammunition sufficient for a skirmish." On March 20, he reported Barteau's Regiment had 235 to 315 men fit for duty.

On April 21, at Palo Alto, Mississippi, the regiment was part of a force under General Samuel J. Gholson which met and defeated the 2nd Iowa Cavalry, and pursued it to near Birmingham. On May 5, at King's Creek, near Tupelo, still with General Gholson, the regiment was mentioned in Federal reports as being engaged in a skirmish at that point.

On May 8, Bishop Paine, in a letter to President Jefferson Davis, reporting on conditions in North Mississippi, listed "Barteau's regiment, 540, 40 with horses, principally armed with shotguns." On May 17, a detachment under Captain Puryear was involved in a skirmish near Albany, Mississippi, and Lieutenant Anderson H. French was commended by General Ruggles for conspicuous gallantry.

On August 27, 1863, the regiment was reported in Ferguson's Brigade at Okolona, Mississippi, along with the 2nd Alabama, 56th Alabama and 12th Mississippi Regiments. Barteau's regiment reported an aggregate of 548 on roll. It moved with General Ferguson to Courtland, Alabama, in October, 1863, and en route, was engaged at Fulton, Mississippi, on October 25. In reporting on this engagement, General Ferguson said: "Lieutenant Colonel Morton is due more than a passing tribute. He led his gallant band with a cool skill and determination, admirable in the extreme."

The regiment remained in Ferguson's Brigade, Chalmers' Division, until January 26, 1864, when it was ordered to report to Major General Nathan Bedford Forrest, who had assumed command of the cavalry forces in North Mississippi. In Forrest's first move to reorganize his command on January 25, 1864, he placed Barteau's Regiment in Colonel (later Brigadier General) Tyree H. Bell's Brigade, along with Russell's, Greer's, Newsom's, and Wilson's Regiments. All of these, except Barteau's, were irregular organizations raised during the fall of 1863 in West Tennessee. All of them, again with the exception of Barteau's, were shortly after consolidated and reorganized by General Forrest. On March 7, Bell's Brigade, of Brigadier General A. Buford's Division, was organized with Barteau's Regiment, 2Oth (Russell's) and 21st (Wilson's) Regiments. These regiments, with later additions, remained in Bell's Brigade until the end.

The regiment was with General Forrest in his running battle with the force under Major General William Sooy Smith, which ended in the latter's total defeat in the Battle of Okolona, February 22, 1864. Reporting on the fighting on the 22nd, Forrest wrote: "About 300 men of the 2nd Tennessee Cavalry, under Colonel Barteau, and the 7th Tennessee Cavalry, Colonel Duckworth, received repeated charges from seven regiments of the enemy in the open field, and drove them back time after time, capturing three stands of colors and one piece of artillery." In 1864, Colonel Barteau became one of Forrest's "most important subordinates."

The regiment took part in the capture of Fort Pillow on April 12, 1864, where Bell's brigade was placed temporarily under the command of Brigadier General James Ronald Chalmers. The regimental played an instrumental role at the Battle of Brice's Cross Roads, June 10, 1864, where Barteau's flanking attack on the Union rear caused a rout and a major defeat for the Federal troops. Its next major engagement was the Battle of Harrisburg, July 13–15, 1864. Here the brigade had been increased by the addition of the 18th (Newsom's) Tennessee Cavalry Regiment. Barteau's Regiment suffered 66 casualties, including Colonel Barteau, who was wounded and furloughed.

It was with General Forrest on his raid into Middle Tennessee, beginning with the capture of Athens, Alabama, on September 24, and ending with the recrossing of the Tennessee River October 8, 1864. As part of Buford's Division, it took part in General John Bell Hood's invasion of Tennessee in November 1864, and withdrew into Mississippi again, after this campaign ended in disaster at Nashville.

On February 13, 1865, General Forrest ordered all the Tennessee forces in his command to report to Brigadier General William Hicks Jackson, for consolidation into six regiments. As a result of this order the regiment was consolidated with the 21st (Wilson's) Regiment to form the 21st and 22nd Consolidated Tennessee Cavalry Regiment. On May 3, 1865, still in Bell's Brigade, the consolidated regiment reported 31 officers, 317 men present for duty, 260 effectives, 423 aggregate present, 641 aggregate present and absent.

The consolidated regiment was paroled at Gainesville, Alabama, in May, 1865.

== See also ==
- List of Tennessee Confederate units
