= Battery E, 1st Illinois Light Artillery Regiment =

- Illinois flag
- Active: December 19, 1861 to July 15, 1865
- Country: United States
- Allegiance: Union
- Branch: Artillery
- Engagements: Battle of Shiloh; 1st Battle of Corinth; Vicksburg Campaign; Expedition to Oxford, MS; Battle of Jackson, Mississippi; Siege of Vicksburg; Jackson Expedition; Battle of Mechanicsville, MS; Expedition to Canton, MS; Battle of Wyatt, TN; Battle of Brice's Crossroads; Battle of Pontotoc, MS; Battle of Tupelo; Price's Missouri Raid; Franklin-Nashville Campaign; Battle of Nashville

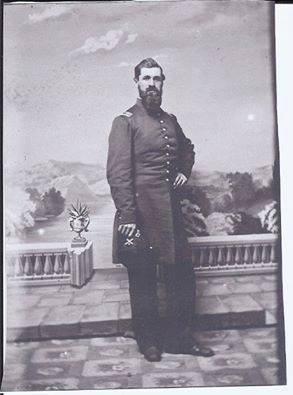
CPT Allen C. Waterhouse, commander of Battery E, 1st Illinois Volunteer Artillery.

Battery E, 1st Illinois Light Artillery Regiment was an artillery battery that served in the Union Army during the American Civil War. It played a minor but noteworthy role in the Battle of Shiloh, and was mentioned in General William T. Sherman's after-action report on the battle. It also served at Vicksburg, Brice's Crossroads, Nashville and in several other engagements in the Western Theater of the war.

== Recruitment ==
Battery E was mustered into service at Camp Douglas, in Chicago, Illinois, on December 19, 1861. Its members came primarily from Cook County. On February 13, 1862, they moved to Cairo, where they were issued with horses, artillery and other necessary equipment.

== Battle of Shiloh ==
=== Initial deployment ===
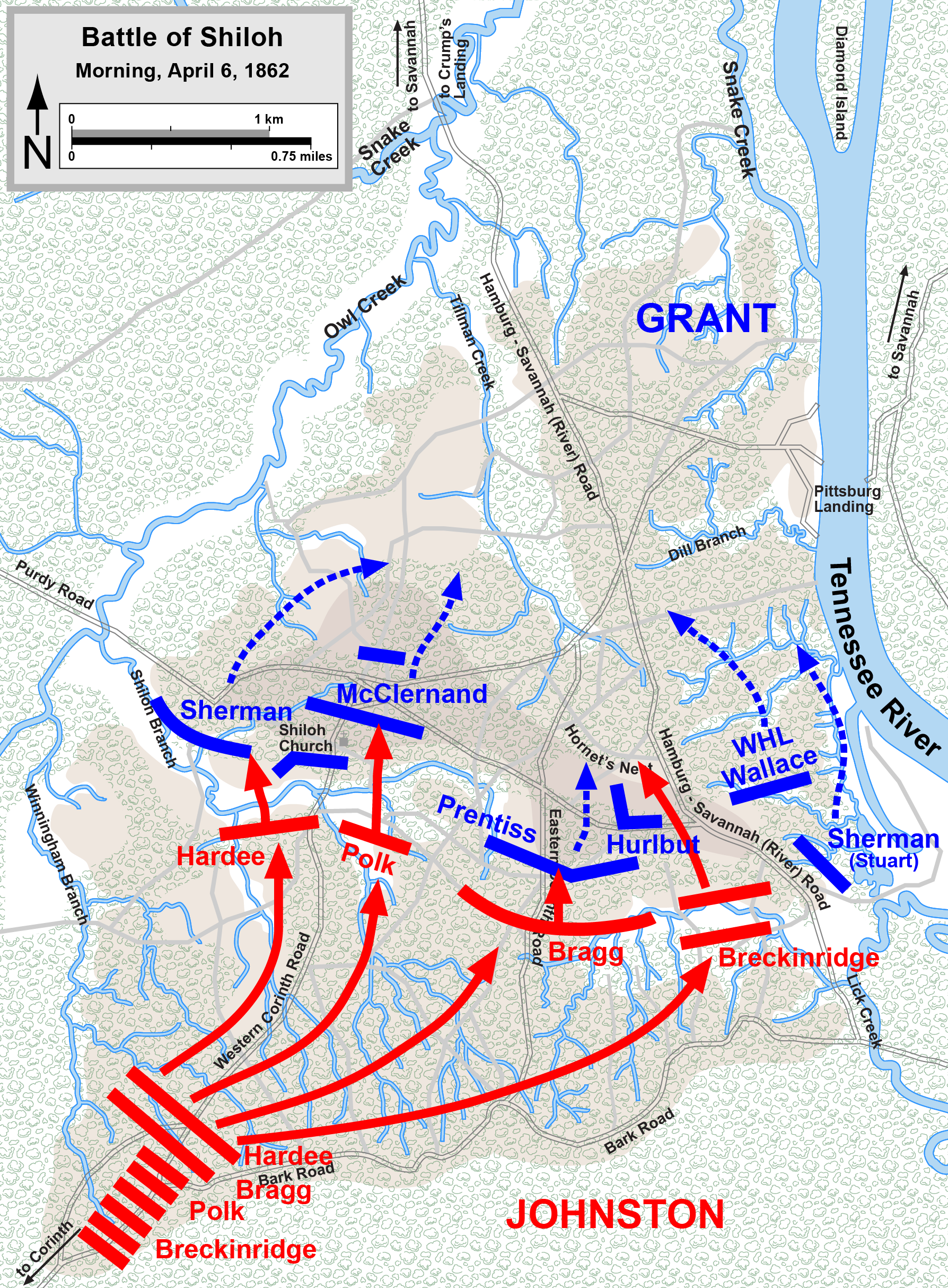
Map of the Battle of Shiloh, morning of April 6, 1862. Battery E served in General Sherman's Fifth Division, near Shiloh Church on the west side of the Union line.

On March 27, 1862, Battery E travelled by boat to Pittsburg Landing, Tennessee, arriving on the 30th. Joining Brig. General William T. Sherman's Fifth Division in Ulysses S. Grant's Army of the Tennessee (together with its sister unit, Battery "B"), the battery was not assigned to a specific brigade for the upcoming Battle of Shiloh, on April 6–7, 1862.

During this engagement, Battery E fielded four James Rifles, a rifled bronze artillery piece that proved popular during the early stages of the war, but later fell out of favor due to the excessive wear that combat service imposed upon rifled bronze cannon. According to one history of this engagement, Battery E was entirely inexperienced, having received its horses only ten days before the battle, and having drilled with them only three times.

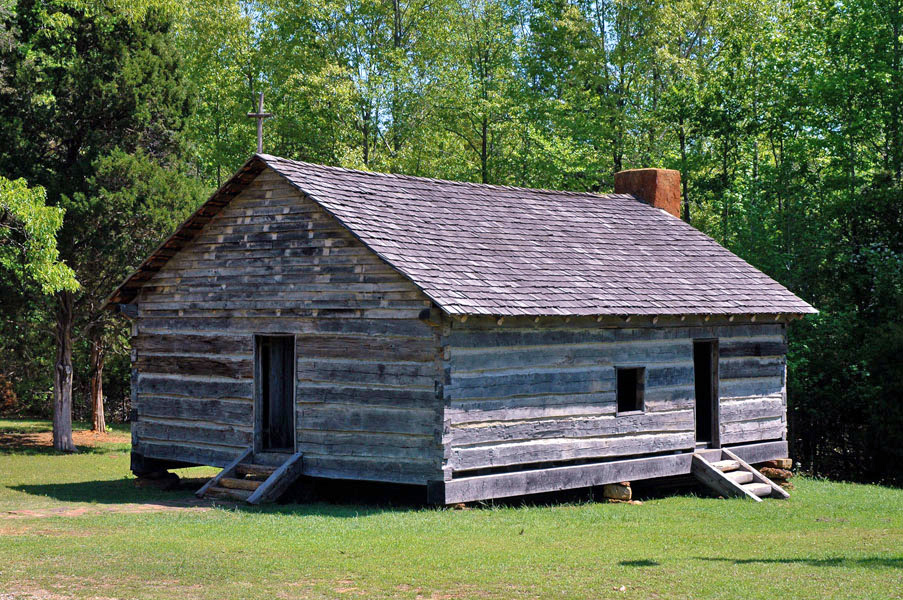
Reconstruction of Shiloh Church at Shiloh National Military Park, 2006. Battery E was located across a ravine adjacent to this church.

According to General Sherman's After-action report, he placed Battery E on a ridge to the left of Shiloh Church, covering a section of open ground between the 57th Ohio Infantry and the 53rd Ohio, near a house called the Rea Cabin. It was the 53rd Ohio's colonel, Jesse J. Appler, who had earlier tried to warn Sherman of large Confederate forces to his front, only to be told: "Take your damned regiment back to Ohio. There is no enemy nearer than Corinth!" The next morning would prove Sherman fatally wrong, as he and the rest of the Union Army were attacked during breakfast by a large Confederate force under General Albert Sidney Johnston.

During the coming battle, Battery E would be engaged in turn by elements of Patrick Cleburne's Second Brigade of Johnston's Third Corps, which was under the command of General William Hardee. It would also be engaged by elements of S.A.M. Wood's Third Brigade of the same corps, and later by elements of Patton Anderson's Second Brigade of the First Division of Braxton Bragg's Second Corps. Later, still, the battery would be engaged by two brigades from Leonidas Polk's First Corps, commanded by Bushrod Johnson and Robert M. Russell. Thus, Battery E would face units from all three of Johnston's main Army Corps during the course of the engagement.

=== The battle begins ===
When the battle began, one section (two guns) of Battery E deployed just to the right of the 53rd, which had abandoned its camp and moved into the edge of a treeline facing an open field. The other section remained to the left of the 53rd, as originally deployed. Across this field, Confederates of the 6th Mississippi Infantry and the 23rd Tennessee advanced rapidly toward them. Twelve Confederate guns from Shoup's Arkansas Battery opened up on the Federals, and after firing two rounds in reply, the section that had originally moved to the right was ordered by Sherman's chief of artillery, Major Ezra Taylor, to rejoin the rest of Battery E, on high ground to the left of the 53rd on the other side of Rea Springs and the east fork of Shiloh Branch.

Sherman, who was on the scene as this attack unfolded, ordered Appler to hold his portion of the line, telling him that he had "a good battery" (E Battery) to protect him. He also sent for three additional regiments to protect "Waterhouse's Battery" (Battery E) and the left flank of his line. Sherman later reported that Battery E and a companion battery further to the right opened up "promptly" on the advancing Confederates along with the assembled infantry. In Sherman's words: "the battle became general". Battery E, together with Battery B of the 1st Illinois, fired into the Confederates advancing up the ridge toward Sherman's line, together with reinforcements crossing Rea Field ont to aid in the assault.

The following is from Major Ezra Taylor's after-action report:

The enemy appearing in large masses, and opening a battery to the front and right of the two guns, advanced across Owl Creek. I instructed Captain Waterhouse to retire the two guns to the position occupied by the rest of his battery, about which time the enemy appeared in large force in the open field directly in front of the position of this battery, bearing aloft, as I supposed, the American flag, and their men and officers wearing uniforms so similar to ours, that I hesitated to open fire on them until they passed into the woods and were followed by other troops who wore a uniform not to be mistaken. I afterward learned that the uniform jackets worn by these troops were black. As soon as I was certain as to the character of the troops I ordered the firing to commence, which was done in fine style and with excellent precision. After instructing the battery to be cool and watch all the movements of the enemy, who was throwing large forces into the timber on the left of its position, I went to the position occupied by Taylor's battery and ordered Captain Barrett to open fire with shell, which was done promptly, causing the enemy to take shelter in the timber, under cover of which he advanced to within 150 yards of the guns, when they opened a tremendous fire of musketry, accompanied by terrific yells, showing their evident intent to intimidate our men; but the only effect it had on the men of this battery was to cause them promptly to move their guns by hand to the front and pouring into them a shower of canister, causing both the yelling and the firing of the enemy to cease for a time. In the mean time the enemy was pushing our force on the left of both of these batteries-Waterhouse's and Taylor's.

Although inflicting severe losses on the attacking Southerners, Appler's regiment ultimately broke and ran after its colonel lost his nerve, leaving Battery E unprotected and facing imminent annihilation by the Confederates. Wood's Brigade obliqued to the right to avoid Battery E's fire; they were quickly replaced in turn by Cleburne's and Anderson's brigades, which suffered horrendous losses at the hands of three Illinois regiments, including the 43rd Illinois, which immediately advanced to assist the artillerists. They too ultimately broke under the ferocity of the Southern assault led now by elements from Cleburne, Anderson, Russell and Johnson's brigades, including the 13th Tennessee.

=== Retreat and regroup ===
Viewing the imminent disintegration of his command, Sherman ordered the remnants of his division, including Battery E, to pull back and regroup on the Hamburg-Purdy Road, about 600 yards behind their current position. However, the battery had barely made 100 yards before Major Taylor rode up and ordered it to unlimber and resume firing, insisting that every inch of ground had to be contested:

Seeing Waterhouse's battery limbering to the rear, and fearing the result of a too hasty retreat, I hastened to the position, and finding him retiring, I at once ordered him to unlimber and contest every foot of ground, while I sent a messenger to find another battery to come to their assistance. My order was promptly obeyed, and they were soon throwing canister among the enemy; but their bravery alone could not drive back the masses who were swarming around their left and pushing back the infantry and opening a flank fire of musketry and a battery, which they had succeeded in planting in the timber in front, they were compelled to retire under a galling fire, leaving three guns and their entire camp and garrison equipage on the field. I take great pleasure them to my entire approbation, and I consider too much praise cannot be bestowed upon them for their gallant conduct on their first battle-field. I respectfully refer you to the official report of Lieutenant J. A. Fitch, commanding, Captain Waterhouse and Lieutenant Abbott both being severely wounded.

Waterhouse's attempt to comply with Taylor's order cost him three of his four guns, and resulted in the wounding of himself and his First Lieutenant. According to David Reed's history of the Battle, Battery E was engaged on its front by several different Southern regiments as the 13th Tennessee flanked it on the left side and attacked it from the rear, capturing its guns as the members beat a hasty retreat. Colonel (later General) Alfred Vaughan, commanding the 13th Tennessee, reported that when his regiment took possession of Battery E's guns they found "a dead Union officer [lying] near them, with a pointer dog that refused to allow the Confederates to approach the body."

The remainder of Sherman's division (including Battery E, minus its three lost guns) finally stabilized their lines in conjunction with General John A. McClernand's First Division. The following morning the Federals counterattacked and the Southern army was forced to retreat to Corinth, giving the exhausted Northerners a victory in the bloodiest battle America had seen up to that time.

=== After the fight ===
Sherman reported that during the battle, his division had captured seven guns to replace those lost to the enemy (three by Battery E, and four from other units) earlier in the engagement; Battery E was re-equipped with this captured ordinance. All told, the battery lost one man killed, sixteen wounded, and one missing during the two-day engagement.

Historians Mark Grimsley and Steven Woodsworth opine that Battery E had performed "magnificently" during the battle, making "an important contribution to prolonging Sherman's stand here." "This is all the more remarkable," they go on to say, "considering the complete lack of experience of Watherhouse's men." Lieutenant J.A. Fitch, who took command of the Battery after Captain Waterhouse was wounded, filed the following after-action report with Major Taylor:

The battery consisted of four 3 1/2-inch and two 4 1/2-inch James rifled cannon. We had received our horses ten days previous to the action and had been in camp one week, in which time we had opportunity for drill only three days. Under these disadvantages we went into action. By your order the battery took position at 7 a.m., two sections on a hill to the left and front of General Sherman's headquarters, and one section across Owl Creek, about 150 yards to the front. The section in advance was compelled to retire, and took position to the left of the other sections. At this time the enemy had a strong force in the woods on the left, and another force, supported by a battery, on the right; a column also advanced across an open field in front. The battery held this position one hour and three-quarters, silencing the enemy's battery, when the infantry supporting us on the left gave way and exposed us to a severe flanking fire. At this time Captain Waterhouse was wounded and was obliged to leave the field, first giving the order to retire. The rear part of one caisson, having been caught among the trees by reason of the rawness of our horses, was necessarily left here. The battery was retiring slowly, under command of Lieutenant A. R. Abbott, when you ordered it to open fire a second time at a point about 100 yards in the rear of our first position. This position was held but a few minutes. The infantry on our left continued to retreat, and the enemy again outflanked us, this time advancing rapidly up the hill upon our left. Lieutenant Abbott being now wounded, I gave the order to retreat, which was effected under a close fire of musketry, when the enemy had approached to about 50 yards from our position. Many of our men and horses had been wounded, and I was obliged to leave on the field two 4 1/2-inch and one 3 1/2-inch guns. After retiring from action it was found upon examination that the remaining guns were disabled from faulty construction of the iron part of the axle-tree. By your order the battery retired to the river. One gun was so far disabled that it broke down and was left on the way to the river. That night, by your advice, I detailed one lieutenant and 24 men, with 3 horses, temporarily to assist Company B, Captain Barrett commanding. The camp and garrison equipage of the company was almost entirely destroyed.

A series of aerial photographs depicting the exact location of "Waterhouse's Battery" and other adjacent units may be seen at Hike Report: The Battle For Shiloh Church. Ground-level photos may be seen here.

== Corinth to White Station ==
=== Corinth and subsequent movements ===
Following the Battle of Shiloh, Battery E moved with the rest of Sherman's division toward Corinth, Mississippi, which was occupied on May 29, 1862. Following this, they made their way down the Memphis and Charleston Railroad, skirmishing with Confederates along the way until they reached Memphis. Here they went into camp at Fort Pickering, where they spent their time drilling with their artillery pieces and horses, seeking to improve their efficiency. During this time, the regiment received new recruits, one of whom was Private James Bolton Rice, whose letters to his wife paint a vivid picture of the battery's activities from the time he joined it to his discharge in 1865.

On November 26, Battery E accompanied Sherman's expedition to Oxford, Mississippi, part of a larger operation undertaken by Grant against Confederate General John C. Pemberton's forces entrenched along the Tallahatchie River near Holly Springs. The Federal force made twelve miles per day on average until it encountered Confederate obstructions near College Hill, near Oxford on December 7. These included trees felled across the road, and "every bridge burned."

Private Rice offers a description of a typical day in Battery E during this campaign:.

At three or four AM, the bugle awoke us. We tumble out or rather up; presently the assembly blows. We answer to roll call, then some bring water, some cook, drivers feed and clean their horses so that in a few moments the drowsy camp is one great thoroughfare. Breakfast is called. We take a piece of meat a cracker in our fingers, and a cup of coffee to wash it down. Put our rations for the day in our horse-sacks, roll up our blankets, strap them upon our harness. The bugle sounds water and harness guns horses, and away we go to execute the command again. The bugle blows hitch up; that's done, drivers mount limber to the front and from a seemingly disorganized camp we present a solid front of bristling guns, prancing horses and stalwart men. Perhaps we sit right there for 2 or 3 hours as regiment after regiment passes us. We awaiting for our proper place finally the long-wished-for moment arrives. The order is given perhaps to break from the right to march to the left, forward then all again is life and animation... All day the vast mass tires on. Those in the front get into camp early; those in the rear don't till 12 or 1 at night. We'll say we are in the rear, for we are about half the time. All day we tail on. We nibble at our grub. Night comes. We heed it not. We have not got to get so far and there is no use at grumbling. At last our camp is assigned us at 10, 11, perhaps 12 o'clock. The roll is called before we dismount. The picket rope is put up. The horses are watered and some goes after feed. The order comes don't take off your harness the cook has boiled a pot of coffee. We gather up some leaves or whatever comes in our way, and spread our blankets, roll up and go to sleep over the same next day.

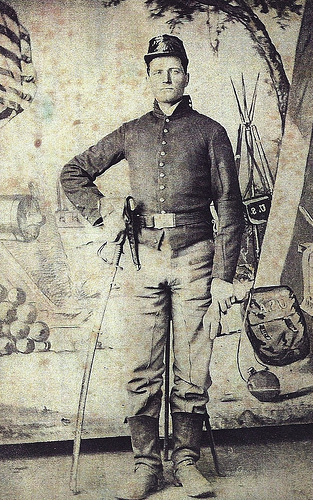
Private James Bolton Rice, who served with Battery E, 1862-1865

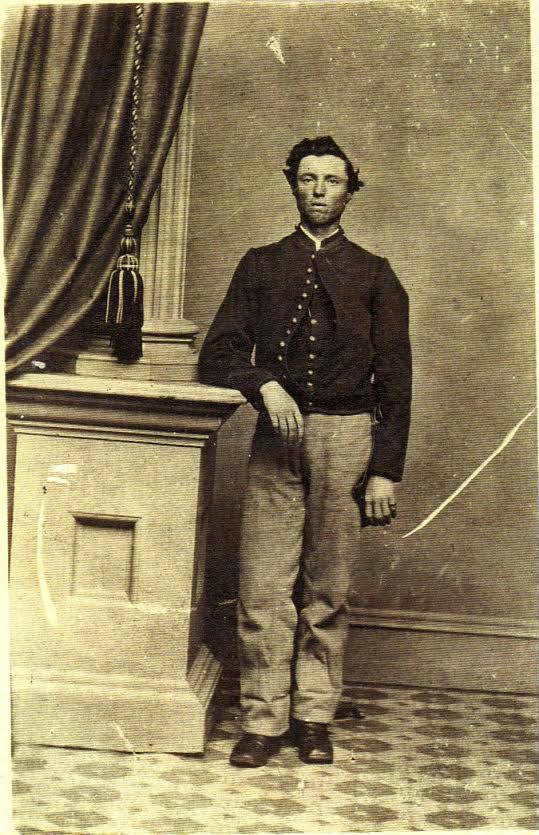
PVT Bissel Pierce Rice, member Battery E, 1st Illinois Light Artillery

Pemberton's army fell back to Grenada without a fight, so Battery E continued with its division to Corinth. It entered Holly Springs, Mississippi sometime prior to January 4, 1863, where Rice describes a scene of devastation left behind by Confederate General Earl van Dorn's raid on the town on December 20, 1862: "broken guns, dead horses, several unburned men, pieces of shells, lights out of every window, government wagons and ambulances half burnt up. The great depot all gone, a train of cars burned upon the track. The air filled [with] the smoke and smell of burning cotton. Large brick buildings blown to atoms, pillaged houses and sick men laying beside the streets."

=== White Station ===
Battery E moved through Holly Springs and on to White Station, Tennessee, where it arrived on January 31, 1863, and encamped. In an effort to fight the cold conditions while wintering there in a Sibley tent, Private Rice describes heating two cast-iron wheels weighing forty pounds each in a fire until they became red-hot, then taking them into his tent, where according to him: "...they make it comfortable." During this time of relative quiet, Rice reports one muster where the battery commander asked all of the "weak-kneed ones" to step forward, as "we would be in a fight in only three hours." Four men answered this call—but another trooper who had been ordered to stay behind begged to change places with one of those being sent into battle, even offering "his last dollar" as an incentive, before being refused by every man in the battery. Apparently the battle did not materialize, as Rice makes no further mention of it.

On February 19 and 20, the members of Battery E were witnesses to the burning of Hopefield, Arkansas, a small town across the river whose citizens had taken the Unionist Loyalty oath, but were secretly assisting local Confederate guerrillas. After several Federal soldiers had been murdered in or near the town, four companies of Northern troops attacked Hopefield and burnt the entire city to the ground. Though Battery E did not actively participate in this event, Rice described it as a "long-merited punishment." Returning to Memphis on March 14 of that same year, they took steamboats to Duckport, Louisiana, a (now vanished) landing on the Mississippi River a few miles northwest of Vicksburg, Mississippi. Here, they rejoined the rest of Sherman's XV Corps, one of five corps assigned to Ulysses S. Grant's Army of the Tennessee that was then preparing to embark on the famed Vicksburg Campaign.

Sometime during the winter, according to Private Rice, Battery E was reduced from a six-gun battery to a four-gun battery, numbering 128 effectives. During its time at Vicksburg (see below) the battery was brought back up to its usual six-gun size once again.

== Vicksburg campaign ==
=== Battle of Jackson ===
On May 2 the battery went to Grand Gulf, Mississippi; from thence they advanced toward Jackson, Mississippi, the capital of the state. The heat during this time was reportedly so intense that even "strong men" fell out of the march and "were left with some comrade to die or come on, as the case might be." Dead horses and mules lay everywhere along the line of march, and Rice reports that Battery E lost six of its own horses to "sunstroke, and drinking poisoned water." Reaching Jackson on May 10, Battery E and the rest of their corps were appalled to discover that the Confederates had disemboweled numerous mules and hogs, then thrown their carcasses into every pond and well to contaminate the water. The air, said he, was filled with the stench of dead animals and members of Battery E and others were detailed over the next two days to bury all the carcasses in the area.

Starting on May 10, Battery E commenced bombardment of the Confederate works at Jackson, beginning at 7am on that Sunday morning. Private Rice reported a bright sunny day, and said that fire and counter-battery fire continued for three hours "as if the heavens were at war with one another, and about to part." Rice himself was nicked by an enemy shell, and others in the battery had what he referred to as "close calls," though no one was seriously hurt.

On May 14, Battery E supported Sherman's final attack on Jackson. Advancing during a driving rainstorm across Lynch Creek, a rain-swollen stream that ran only two miles from the Mississippi State Capitol, the XV Corps quickly ran into the Third Kentucky Mounted Infantry, the First Georgia Sharpshooter Battalion and Captain Martin's Georgia Battery. The Federal advance was temporarily halted before Battery E and a companion battery from the 2nd Iowa responded in kind. One Iowa soldier briefly described Battery E's role in this battle in these terms:

The regiment followed to the brow of the hill that looked down on the creek winding in muddy swirls ... Far to the right we could hear our own battery, the Second Iowa, its bronze Napoleons throbbing like a heart of fire. And at our left, the Waterhouse Battery of Chicago [Battery E], was baying like a wolf-hound at the grey-clad battalions.

The "accurate fire" from Battery E and the Iowa artillery, coupled with the overwhelming Federal advantage in manpower, quickly forced the Confederates to retreat into their defensive works; within a matter of a few hours, Sherman's XV Corps had entered Jackson. The battery remained in Jackson until May 16, taking no part in the Battle of Champion Hill.

Union and Confederate lines at Vicksburg

.

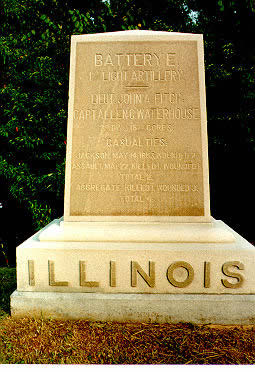
Memorial marker for Battery E at Vicksburg National Military Park (Courtesy NPS).

=== Action at Vicksburg ===
On May 16, Battery E moved toward Vicksburg, the South's "Gibraltar of the West". It arrived on the 18th, where it took an active part in the siege as part of the Third Division of Sherman's XV Corps. Fielding four James Rifles and three captured 6-pound guns, it was assigned together with the 2nd Battery of Iowa Light Artillery as the division's artillery force near the northeast corner of the Confederate defensive line (currently located along Old Graveyard Road, between Union Ave. and Confederate Ave.). They supported the abortive Federal assault upon the "Stockade Redan" on May 22, which resulted in more than a thousand Federal casualties, and led to the awarding of 78 Medals of Honor to attacking soldiers. A photo of the exact location of Battery E's position at Vicksburg may be seen here. The larger page from which this photo was taken may be viewed here.

On May 30, the battery was given a 30-pound Parrott rifle, which it retained until 3 June, when that gun was moved to a more advanced position at "Battery Jenny."

On 5 June, Battery E was ordered to trade its old artillery pieces in for six new 12-pound guns. The battery was divided into three two-gun sections; two, under Lieutenants John Fitch and Orrin Cram, remained on the line. The third was moved up to an advanced battery. By 7 June, Private Rice reported to his wife that the battery had been split between five different places, and only counted 96 men as fit for duty.

In contrast to the starving Confederates inside Vicksburg—whose lack of food ultimately doomed their defense of the city, rather than the unsuccessful Federal assaults on their defenses—Battery E and the rest of the Union Army fared well with regard to victuals during the siege. Rice reported that he had to eat here: "flour, tea, coffee, sugar, hardtack, pork, dried apples, rice, beans and fresh beef every other day." He said that his favorite food was "flour and water mixed together as you would make batter, fry it in grease with meat, a cup of coffee, a hardtack and sugar; I make out a hearty meal."

=== Artillerists as infantry ===
Members of Battery E sometimes fought as sharpshooters and even infantry during the siege. Private Rice relates his own experience:

Damnation how these Rebels love to shoot. Cuss their eyes, but we'll make them pay for it when we get in Vicksburg to see how cooly [sic?] we take it... Some go and sharpshoot on their own hook; your Bote [here Rice is speaking of himself] has had a couple of bouts with them and tomorrow I'm going to have another... Get me an Enfield Rifle and shoot toward a Secesh... We have moved up to within 50 rods [825 feet] of the guns, and since I've been writing the boys have been giving them thunder. They only reply with small arms. At the storming of the fort the other day...I made up my mind to go and bullied ahead for this attack. Volunteers were called for from the whole division. 160 volunteered; 100 got back alive.

On 22 June Battery E relocated with two infantry brigades from the 3rd Division to Bear Creek on the exterior line, where it remained until Vicksburg was surrendered by General Pemberton on July 4, 1863. Throughout the siege, the Battery lost two killed and six wounded.

== Later operations in Mississippi ==
=== Expedition to Brandon, Mississippi ===
On July 5, 1863, the day after Vicksburg's surrender, a detachment from Battery E was ordered with elements of the 72nd Ohio Infantry, the 114th Illinois, the 8th Iowa and the 9th Iowa to proceed under the command of General Frederick Steele to Brandon, Mississippi. Here they were directed to locate and burn Confederate military stores and destroy the local railroad. The battery lost one of its three guns while crossing a pontoon bridge over the Pearl River, but the piece was recovered the next day. Encountering Southern cavalry about six miles past the bridge, the battery's "war dogs" (to quote Private Rice) quickly drove them back.

Next came a report from Federal scouts that an enemy battery was on a nearby hill. Battery E was ordered to shell the hillside in an effort to find the enemy's position, while their escort watched from a nearby fence:

... My piece was brought into action in the road. The 3rd was planted in the corn to the right between two fields of corn. It was hot as a furnace. The sun was directly over our heads. The infantry had mounted the fences to get air and watch our shots, not believing the Rebs had a gun. We fired two shots, then saw the smoke curling up from two places. The word ran from mouth to mouth: 'good God, a masked battery!' and such a getting down off of fences you never saw... The calm steady tones of our captain saying: 'Steady, my men, be cool; watch their shots and drop.' When the [enemy] shells reached us (1 1/4 miles distant) [we] found them all in line and laying close to the ground... We fought them for two hours, flanked them on both sides, just then a heavy thundershower came up and they withdrew, leaving their supper cooking, three dead horses and two dead men behind them... They had four guns pitted against our two. Just as it began to rain, the infantry charged them. Our loss was some 10 or 12 killed, and 20 wounded. Our gun was their mark... They shot to the left, right, over and all around us.

Riding into Brandon, Battery E engaged Confederate scouts in a house there, "knocking out every window" there. They set fire to a storehouse and burned down an entire city block, then turned their attention to the railroad depot and nearby tracks which they equally destroyed.

=== Return to Jackson ===
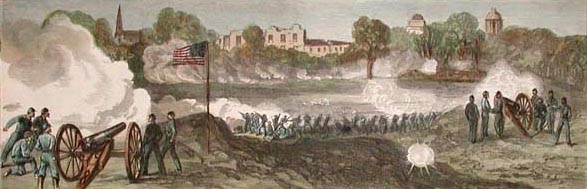
Siege of Jackson, Mississippi, July 10–16, 1863

Following this event, Battery E returned to Jackson (which had been reoccupied by Confederate forces). Though harassed during their march by Southern units, Private Rice reported that they "kept out of range of our brass band. For when we play 'Dixie' on it, it makes them more than dance." Upon arriving at Jackson they assisted in a nine-day siege, after which Confederate General Joseph E. Johnston evacuated the city. Jackson was described as a "doomed city" in the battle's aftermath, with Rice affirming that he and his comrades tore up and burned tracks and ties from five different railroads extending twenty miles out from the city in all directions.

Ordered to return to Vicksburg, Battery E and other units crossed the battlefield at Champion Hill, scene of a Federal victory about two months earlier. Rice describes how rain had washed away the soil used to cover the corpses of Confederate dead, who had simply been tossed into ditches on the battlefield by Federal troops and covered with a layer of dirt. He also describes men kicking at skulls, bones and clothing protruding from the half-opened graves.

=== Bear Creek ===
Having returned to Vicksburg, On July 23 Battery E went into camp on Bear Creek on Oak Ridge, where they were exceptionally troubled by chiggers and flies, not to mention the oppressive summer heat. This became their summer camp, and expeditions were made to Mechanicsburg, Miss., Canton, and other places. On November 5 they took boat for Memphis, arriving there the 12th. During that winter they went to Lagrange, Tennessee and also, Corinth, Jack Creek, back again to Corinth, then finally back to Memphis via Lagrange.

=== Meridian expedition ===
On February 6, 1864, Battery E was ordered to cooperate with a 7000-man cavalry column led by General William Sooy Smith, moving south from Memphis to link up with General Sherman's forces engaged in the Meridian Expedition. By this point, it had been equipped with six 12-pound Napoleon guns. On the 10th of February 1864 it fought in a skirmish at Wyatt, Tennessee, on the Tallahatchie River, but five days later the Battery was ordered back to Memphis and took no further role in the campaign.

Back in Memphis, Battery E camped at the head of Main Street, near the city's Navy Yard. In April 1864 they went to Bolivar and Ripley, Mississippi in search of General Nathan Bedford Forrest; but their supplies soon ran out and they were forced to return to Memphis to refit. On May 5 the battery was attacked by local Confederates; these were beaten back, according to Rice, with "one of them [receiving] nine balls in his carcass."

=== Disaster at Brice's Crossroads ===
June 1, 1864, Battery E marched to Guntown, Mississippi, where it took part in the disastrous Battle of Brice's Crossroads on June 10. Together with the 9th Minnesota Infantry, the battery initially formed a reserve force deployed near the crossroads itself. Attacked by Confederates under General Forrest on both flanks at once, Colonel William McMillian, commanding the infantry on that portion of the field, ordered Battery E to sweep the Guntown Road with grapeshot and canister. Despite heroic efforts by the 9th Minnesota and other Federal units the Northern army was pushed back, with Col. McMillian ordering Battery E with Battery B of the Second Illinois Light Artillery to hold off the Rebels until the infantry could escape.

The fleeing Federals became bottled up on a bridge just north of the crossroads, where they were raked by Confederate artillery as they struggled to cross the narrow structure. The retreat degenerated into a rout, and Forrest won one of the greatest victories in his career. Battery E, which had been ordered to hold the crossroads itself at all costs, found itself stranded amidst the advancing Southern attack, deserted by all infantry support—but still firing without letup. Captain John Fitch, commanding the battery in this battle, describes the scene amid the tangled underbrush and forest: "I could not see the enemy, but judged from their firing that they were very near. I immediately gave them canister with both pieces, as fast as I could load and fire." Fitch and the rest of Battery E managed to hold their ground until the last of the Federal regiments had passed, though by this time they were being fired on from front, left and rear—including the garden of a plantation house only seventy-five feet away. Incredibly, Battery E managed to limber its two guns and escape to the nearby creek, where they stormed through the water to the safety of a road on the other side.

Private Rice offered this detailed account of the engagement as he witnessed it from his section:

We had nothing worthy of note [along their line of march] till we arrived at Ripley. Then we had a slight skirmish driving the enemy before us, then encamping for the night. The next morning we struck camp and marched within fourteen miles of Guntown ... it having rained every day from this place. The morning of the tenth dawned bright and clear, and proved to be one of the hottest days of the season. Some fifty wagons with the sick, under a small guard, were sent back to Memphis, and we were ordered to again prepare for fighting. We broke camp at half past seven. Grierson had already gone on with his cavalry to commence the fight. The troop marched off in fine spirits, confident of success ... The road runs straight across the little creeks and swamps which formed the headwaters of the Talahatchie. Then within eight miles of the battlefield the road crosses a swamp so bad that we could hardly get our artillery over it in daylight. The rest of the distant is hills and swamp. We pressed on till within six miles of Guntown. We heard firing in the front, and soon orders came for the Second Brigade to double-quick. It was then nearly noon and hot as blazes. Off went the Second Brigade while we went on our regular gait. When within two miles the fighting became heavier, and soon Co. B's guns began to bark loud and strong showing the Second Brigade had already gone in. At this point we were ordered to double-quick and started out, the train still following. When within one mile of the line of battle, we began to find squads of men from the Second Brigade lying under almost every tree, sun-struck. I think that amount must have been 200 from that brigade alone. To sum it all up, we rushed ahead by train and all right into the thickest of the fight. So close that we did not get but one of our guns in action. No force was kept in reserve. When the tired infantry was put in, the exhausted cavalry was drawn off. Our brigade charged twice and took two stands of colors and some prisoners. Then the enemy charged twice and were repulsed. They rallied with overwhelming numbers, and came on the third time. After a desperate resistance our infantry gave way, falling back upon the artillery (by that time, we were flanked on both sides), [and] we [were] dragging off our guns to find the way blocked up with the train, ambulances, wounded men and horses, with our cavalry on every side. It was out of the question for horse or carriage to get out any other way than on the road. Here commenced as sad a scene as has happened during the war ... When a whole force gives way before overpowering numbers, pursued by an unrelenting, bloodthirsty enemy, then brave, gallant and well-drilled men become like women, or in the same ratio that woman is to man. When our men gave way, they swept back onto the train like a great wave. Most of them out of ammunition. Sternly and doggedly we fell back, dragging our guns behind the almost panic-stricken infantry. The foe charging in solid lines. The enemy rushing up and capturing that portion of the train containing the ammunition, in the first capture that they made. From here eight miles back to the first great swamp was one battleground strewn with the dead, dying and wounded. That night closed the scene. At intervals the infantry and cavalry would form and check the foe, while the heavy artillery passed through. The ground [was] so soft and the enemy pressed so close, that with the exception of two places artillery was no use as a weapon. The foe had a flank movement on our right, and right well he used it at the distance of 3/4 of a mile. He kept pinching shell, shrapnel and spherical case into our torn and ragged ranks. Surrender we would not. Sturgis wished to, but lion-hearted Grearson swore that we would all die, first. At dark we reached the swamp, and fighting ceased from exhaustion on both sides and want of daylight ... 1 AM brought the orders to destroy our carriages, and spike our guns.

The Battle of Brice's Crossroads.

Rice further indicates that Forrest harassed the retreating Federals throughout the following day until they finally reached the safety of Memphis. He reports that some Rebel prisoners being escorted to the rear during the battle, upon being asked where they were going, answered: "the same way you'll be going, in less than an hour." A wounded Federal soldier, watching this debacle unfold around him, tried to put his best spin on things by shouting: "ole Grant will make it up, in Virginia." Rice reports that when the butcher's bill was tallied, the battery had lost fifty horses, ten mules, three wagons, forty sets of harness, and four guns with their caissons. Two men of the battery were killed, three were wounded and four were missing. Rice attributed the defeat to the "drunkenness or incompetency of Sturgis," indicating that he and several other soldiers were inclined to believe he had deliberately sold them out. Despite all of this, Rice spoke of "[aching] to get at old Forrest again," promising to "make him git, when we do."

In his after-action report, Colonel Alexander Wilkin, commanding the 9th Minnesota, commended Captain Fitch of Battery E for the "judicious and gallant manner" in which he and his battery had conducted themselves during the battle. The battery returned to Memphis after the defeat, "every man for himself", with the men listed as "very much demoralized".

The battery next marched on Tupelo, and July 12 it fought at Pontotoc, Mississippi. On July 13, they were ambushed, losing one man wounded. On the 14th, the battery participated in the Battle of Tupelo, which resulted in a defeat for Forrest.

== Actions in Missouri ==
On July 15, 1864, Battery E returned to Memphis. The cannon lost to Forrest were replaced with four Napoleons and two steel Rodmans. On September 3, 1864, they took steamboats down the Mississippi to White River Gap and from thence to Duvall's Bluff, Arkansas. Marching through Arkansas swamps to Cape Girardeau under General J. A. Mower, they next travelled up the Missouri River to Jefferson City, Missouri where they joined in the Federal pursuit of Confederate General Sterling Price, who was then engaged in a campaign inside his home state. Rice reported that the people around Jefferson City were suffering a "perfect reign of terror," as "all [of them] are Union." The men had initially been ordered not to take any spare clothing or belongings other than a blanket during their initial deployment, thus all of them were miserable and several were even barefoot by the time they drew new uniforms in St. Louis. Rations were often reduced to a quarter of the usual fare, with troopers forced to forage along the roadsides for "pumpkin sauce and beef."

After Price's defeat at Westport near Kansas City, the Battery returned to St. Louis on November 15, 1864.

== Service at Nashville ==
After drawing a new complement of horses, Battery E took boats for Nashville, Tennessee, where they served under General Thomas during Hood's siege of that city. In a letter dated 8 December 1864, Rice reports that "we have no firing along the line directly in front of us today, but the Johnnies can be seen plainly with a glass about three miles off, doing their camp duty." He goes on to relate his opinion of General Thomas and of his Confederate counterpart, General John Bell Hood:

My idea is that Mr. Hood is trying to play some long-headed game on us, rather than to come up and fight us. Whether Thomas will be equal to him after, results will show. At any rate we have the utmost confidence in his ability to head off Hood in any of his strategic movements. It's impossible for any army to move with the present state of the weather ... Should Hood fall back? It is probable they would go after him, and it is believed by everyone that it's almost impossible for either to avoid a great battle much longer ... But this much I believe, as I have said before, that Hood can neither hood-wink us or whip us. Still I admit that he is one of their very best generals, and fights his men rasher and more daring than any other, but he comes against veterans when he meets this army. For my own part I cannot yet divine what will be the upshot of this raid, for we can turn peg-leg Hood's advent into this state ... My opinion is that Thomas will wait until he's good [and] ready, and then take the offensive instead of the defensive.

Rice reports that the battery was well-supplied with sanitary supplies and rations during this time, and that many of its sick members were "improving in health." He equally reported that "damnable speculators" had driven up the price of food and stationery, with one sheet of paper being sold for five cents, and flour for $35 per barrel. Several original members of the battery were discharged at this point and sent home, while others were compelled to serve out extensions to their original three-year terms.

On 15 December Thomas did exactly what Rice had predicted: he emerged from his trenches, and attacked Hood's army. Rice relates his experience of the ensuing battle:

The morning of the fifteenth [of December] we had revile, and shortly afterwards the cavalry began to file out at the sally port by our battery until a whole division had massed in a solid square just outside of our picket line and were dismounted at parade rest. At four [AM] our guns on the [word missing] began to roar, interspersed with the rattle of musketry. Shortly afterwards our old divisions began to file out so that by daylight there was a strong line of battle on our right, confronting the Rebel pickets ... We were fortunate for once to be in the reserve, and consequently were spectators. The heavy firing on the left was only a feint to have the enemy's attention drawn from our real purpose. How readily he took the bait, the sequel will show. The enemy's left was five miles from his center, and strongest position among the hills. Old A.J. [Smith] was given the task of turning his left and doubling it back along his center. Our left and center behind their works kept up a most terrific cannonade, while Smith at 8 AM began to press them slowly. The enemy opened with two batt[eries] upon him, and for over an hour Smith's men hardly replied ... At half past nine Smith [ran] one of his own batt[eries] up and began to play his part in the game under cover of this. The solid squares he had laying in hollows and behind fences were thrown into line with the almost rapidity of thought as if he had just touched a spring of automatons ... The infantry went in with fixed bayonets, and the cavalry firing their five-shooters. Then there was mounting in hot haste in the Rebel lines, and a general skedaddle was the result ... Ole A.J. followed them up all the afternoon and by night he had done his task, doubling their left back five miles onto its center ... To give you an idea of our lines, imagine a saucer broke into four exact pieces. We occupied the broken edges, and they the higher and outer edge.

If things had gone badly for Hood on the 15th, they would turn disastrous on the following day. Rice continues his account:

The morning of the 16th dawned and at half past eight the cannons in front of the enemy began to roar and kept it up all day until 3 [PM], when a grand charge was made sweeping everything before. It [captured] a whole division entire, two generals and most all of their artillery. The whole Rebel force stampeding in confusion and throwing arms and all the trappings of a soldier away, worse than we did at Guntown. The whole host of Hood's who had (as they supposed) held us so valiantly on our side of the works were entirely routed ... We captured 51 pieces of artillery, 8000 prisoners, and 12,000 stand of arms.

The Battle of Nashville, December 15–16

With this disaster, the once-mighty Army of Tennessee practically ceased to exist, playing no appreciable role during the rest of the Civil War. Battery E went into garrison duty at Nashville, where their meat rations were reduced by the Army to "3/4 of a pound [per man] per day, also 3/4 ration of beans, coffee, sugar ... All the salt meat our detachment of 19 [men] drew for five days is 14 pounds and a little beef that no one but a soldier or a dog would think of eating ... This comprises our only food, except that now and then we draw onions, sour, heart, pickles, and potatoes in small quantities from [the] sanitary commission." One seven-by-eight foot wedge tent was provided for every three to four men in the battery; these were raised four feet off the ground on wooden platforms constructed by the troops, who then "embellished" them to suit the tastes of the occupants. Bunks and a fireplace were erected inside, and the floor covered with sawdust.

The battery redeployed to Chattanooga on 21 February 1865, "after a 24-hour ride over the roughest RR in the U.S." Rice reports that the train derailed at some point during its journey, but since it was only moving at ten miles-per-hour nobody was hurt.

== Muster out ==
The battery's initial enlistments expired December 19, 1864, but these veterans were not mustered out of service until December 24, 1864, at Louisville, Kentucky. New recruits were brought into replace those who had been discharged; these continued to serve until July 15, 1865, when they were discharged near Chattanooga, Tennessee.

== Total strength and casualties ==
The battery lost 5 enlisted men who were killed in action or who died of their wounds and 25 enlisted men who died of disease, for a total of 30 fatalities.

== Anecdotes ==
=== Camp followers ===
Private James Bolton Rice, whose letters home to his wife provide a vivid description of life and action in Battery E from 1862 to 1865, gives a picture of the seedier side of life in a Federal army camp during mid-1862:

If they had women in the hospital [Pvt. Rice is saying this to his wife; he was on temporary duty as a hospital orderly at this time], I would have you come down and we would both go in; but a woman here is thought of no more than one of ill fame, and finely one can't honest stir out unless she is insulted. There is so many of the other class. They will come in from the city [St. Louis] dressed up in style, and pretend to be looking for their husbands until they get a good bid; then off they go out of sight... And there's always women enough to cooperate with anything that comes up.

Rice followed this statement up with his own assurance of loyalty to his wife, telling her that this sight "disgust[s] me more than anything I see in the Army."

=== On the march ===
In a letter dated January 22, 1863, Rice describes what it was like to be on the march, on half-rations in the Federal army:

We had for breakfast hardtack with coffee, and for dinner a small piece of cornbread and also a slice of very good boiled ham smoked for supper... Now one word about rations and half rations... a soldier's feeling is different, his taste is different, his appetite is different, his whole being in regards to enduring fatigue is different; still I never can or could live on corn cake. Let me take a day or two's eating to illustrate for instance. We awoke at three in the morning, we have ten minutes to roll out and prepare for roll call... By the time breakfast is ready, the most of us can eat raw beef if one is well, and as the boys say to eat then why all he has to do is put it in his haversack throughout the day. He nibbles on it. Perhaps we don't stop till 10 or 11 o'clock at night, he has his duty to do come what will. There is no excuse for being tired. We are all tired, would be his answer if he made that as a plea to get free from duty. He's very tired and hungry and if he tries to preserve his health he won't eat much at night but will find a place to lay down. Perhaps at 12 the bugles blows him out again by 4 and by the time breakfast comes I'll bet he'll eat; if not he can trot on another day. Then if he's got a good bottom, a good constitution and good grit, he'll come out all right and in a few weeks, you'd think he could go all the time.

Needless to say, conditions in the Confederate forces were even worse, as their logistics system was not nearly as well-supplied or developed as its Federal counterpart.

=== Dissention in the ranks ===
In another letter, Rice describes the antipathy many Federal soldiers felt following the issuance of Abraham Lincoln's Emancipation Proclamation in January 1863:

To try to disguise or hide the facts that there is a great changing of ideas in the Army (and I think by what I read at home) would be useless. Almost every hour in the day on the march, in the camp, off duty or on duty, in tent or by campfire, one can hear the following expressions: I be d-d if I enlisted to free niggers... if ole Abe doesn't retract his proclamation I hope the Northerners will get together and take the reins of government out of his hands, and thousands of other such expressions... For my part I am down on all such sentiments, I have pledged my arm to the government of my fathers, and thus it shall be raised come well, come woe.

In subsequent paragraphs, Rice voraciously attacks Northern "Copperheads", referring to them as "damning traitors" and saying they should be "choked down and served as we serve them down here." He goes on to say that four men in his own regiment are Copperheads (in his estimation), describing them as "weak-kneed, weak-backed ones who were scared into the Service through fear of the draft." He ends, however on a note of guarded optimism that the government will overcome the "arch-traitors" and "rise like the morning mist, and show the world that America still stands with its government and institutions stronger better dearer than ever."

=== Grant and Sherman ===
During the Siege of Vicksburg, Rice wrote down his impressions of Ulysses S. Grant's generalship, together with his opinion of the rampant rumors of his drunkenness earlier in the war:

They can say what they please about Grant, but he's the only successful general the North has. They said he was drunk at Shiloh and that he was nothing but an old ditcher this spring, but while he left a few men digging the ditch he was slyly massing his forces, ready when he said the word to pommel on the enemy which he has done; and now he has them corralled in Vicksburg... Johnston is said to be coming by the way of Black River on our rear and Bragg is said to be at Yazoo City, but we can fight them front and rear, right and left till they get sick of it... Little U.S.G. is equal to the task, and we are all confident in ourselves.

Rice later recorded his opinion of William T. Sherman's generalship, speaking of the "invincible Wm Sherman," and reporting that "wherever he goes, the soldiers greet him with cheer on cheers, shouting what the heroes of Vicksburg think of him ... suffice it that we are all willing to follow him to victory or death."

Rice does not indicate how much this glowing opinion of his leaders was shared by his comrades in Battery E, or what their views might have been. His assessment of Grant's talent certainly proved well-founded, as Grant would be elevated to General-in-Chief of all Federal armies the following year, and go on to lead the North to victory two years later. Sherman would equally go on to success and fame in Georgia, South Carolina and North Carolina.

=== The dark side ===
Looting has been a pastime for soldiers of every century, and the Civil War was certainly no exception. Not all Union or Confederate troopers fit the popular image of a citizen-soldier fighting for a noble cause; some were simply criminals in uniform. Several such men seem to have found their way into Battery E and its sister units during the winter of 1863–64, as Private Rice relates in a letter to his wife:

Pet, this company is undoubtedly the hardest company in this department, and the men who were detailed from the infantry were in a great measure the worst men in the regiment. Yes, Pet, here in our brave company will be found men who will stoop to the most depraved actions. There is gangs organized all throughout the company who will let no chance go by where they can steal anything no matter what it is, so they can sell it and get greenbacks. They are out prowling around every night, and hardly a night passes but they bring in some booty. On our last scout to Jackson, four of my squad made some $500 from stuff they plundered from citizens. Two of these cusses went into a house of a man who belongs to the 6th Tennessee (Union). He was at Corinth sick. His wife had gone to see him, leaving the children and servants in charge of the place. These damnable contemptible devils in soldier's uniforms belonging to our gallant battery went ahead of the column and robbed the house of $30 in silver halves and quarters, several nice heavy blankets and all the silver spoons in the house ... They will steal anything from a lady's underclothes to knocking a man down and stealing his money ... There is not a payday but what several of the company is robbed. For any one or half a dozen men to inform against them (except for theft within the company) would be like putting his head under the axe of the guillotine. These men will plunder and when they get in town they spend it all in houses of ill fame. Four caught the clap in Corinth and are hardly fit for duty.

Rice further elaborates on gangs of muggers in the Union Army, whom he claimed would waylay anyone they met, high or low:

In almost every company, at least in every regiment, there is an organized gang who band themselves together for the purpose of plunder, thievery and robbery. All the gangs are constantly on the alert to find out who has money. That done, the unsuspicious victim is tracked, be he soldier or civilian, wherever he goes. Some of them will form an acquaintance with him, learn his habits, and arrange the time and place for their comrades to mug him ... Sometimes they are dressed as citizens, sometimes as soldiers or gun-boat men. Sometimes in Confederate uniform just to suit their purpose. Frequently the muggers are citizens, renegades from both armies who keep in the wake of a large force for the opportunity of plundering ... Citizens, soldiers and officers are all alike to them. They would mug General Grant or Abe Lincoln.

Rice reported that few of these men were ever punished, mostly due to lack of evidence or the reluctance of fellow soldiers to testify against them (often from fear of reprisal).

=== Philosophical ruminations ===
In a letter to his wife dated 7 May 1864, Private Rice recorded his own thoughts on the Federal cause, what a Confederate victory would mean for the nation, and the rampant corruption in governmental and economic circles:

The war at present is almost at a standstill. All eyes are turned upon the two great men who are now handling the mighty armies of the Union. Yes, the eyes of friend and foe are anxiously watching the two great chieftains, Sherman and Grant. Will they succeed is for a few more months to decide. All the resources of the mighty North are at their command, and the hearts of every loyal being beat with the fervent hope that they will. Should they fail and their armies [be] crushed, it is a pretty clear fact that the hated Southern Confederacy will be established. Then will come a dissolution of this once-powerful republic in almost every form. The enemies of the Union know it, feel it, say it. The foe is making herculean efforts. He is leaving nothing undone that will aid him in the coming campaign. He is concentrating his hosts for a mighty and final struggle with the (so far) always victorious heroes. That blood will run like a Waterloo, there's no doubt ... then if the war-stained chieftains are routed it seems as if all nature would weep at the spectacle. Then might will have triumphed over right, and for the next century there will be nothing but an anarchy and a desolation on this fair American continent. Sometimes I think it would be a just chastisement if the All-Wise should doom our arms to a total reverse, for I honestly believe that a more corrupt set of men in general never wielded the powers of a government more than we have at present. The government of the once-mighty Roman Republic that brought theirs to degradation was nothing compared to the corruptness of ours today ... Men in power professing Christianity and all the attributes of true dignity are secretly robbing the government and selling their souls (if they have any) to mammon while hearth stones are made desolate, our cause growing weaker every day. The heart of the nation palpitating like a frightened doe at its adversity ... The summer campaign will tell the tale. With success to our armies, we will then have time and opportunity to renovate our morals as a nation and get back on the beaten track of the immortal Washington and Jefferson. With reverse, the government, the precepts based upon right and virtue which these men established will be over turned and absolute sovereignty despotism and anarchy will have triumphed over right through our own evils and corruptions ... We can no more than die, and die I'd rather than to see the day of the Rebels' triumph.

In a letter written on the occasion of Abraham Lincoln's assassination, Rice makes it clear that he did not consider Lincoln himself to be anything other than "the greatest statesman ... its most silent and sharpest legislator: one who possessed coolness, firmness and a just knowledge with the courage to enforce it which no other man in the length and breadth of this land possesses."

== Commanders ==
- Captain Allen C. Waterhouse - promoted to major.
- Captain John A. Fitch - promoted to major.
- Captain Orrin W. Cram - Mustered out with the battery.

== Assignments and service ==
=== Organizational assignments ===
Organized at Chicago, Ill., and mustered in December 19, 1861.
Moved to Cairo, Ill., February 13, 1862.
Attached to District of Cairo, Ill., to March, 1862.
Artillery, 5th Division, District of Memphis, Tenn., to November, 1862.
Artillery, 5th Division, District [1037] of Memphis, Tenn., Right Wing 13th Army Corps (Old), Dept. of the Tennessee, November, 1862.
Artillery, 1st Division, District of Memphis, Tenn., 13th Army Corps, to December, 1862.
Artillery, 8th Division, 16th Army Corps, to March, 1863.
Artillery, 3rd Division, 15th Army Corps, to December, 1863.
Artillery, 1st Division, 16th Army Corps, to June, 1864.
Artillery, 1st Division, Sturgis' Expedition, June, 1864.
1st Brigade, 1st Division, 16th Army Corps, to December, 1864.
Artillery, 1st Division, Detachment Army of the Tennessee, Dept. of the Cumberland, to February, 1865.
Artillery Reserve, Dept. of the Cumberland, Chattanooga, Tenn., to July, 1865.

=== Engagements and service ===
Duty at Paducah, Ky., till March, 1862.
Expedition from Paducah to Tennessee River and operations about Crump's Landing, Tenn., March 8–14.
Expedition to Yellow Creek, Miss., and occupation of Pittsburg Landing, Tenn., March 14–17.
Battle of Shiloh, Tenn., April 6–7.
Advance on and siege of Corinth, Miss., April 29-May 30.
March to Memphis, Tenn., via Lagrange, Grand Junction and Holly Springs, June 1-July 21.
Duty at Memphis, Tenn., till November.
Grant's Central Mississippi Campaign, November 2, 1862, to January 10, 1863.
Guard R. R. till March, 1863.
Moved to Memphis, thence to Duckport, La., March 12-April 1.
Demonstrations on Haines' and Snyder's Bluffs April 25-May 2.
Movement to join army in rear of Vicksburg, via Richmond and Grand Gulf, May 2–14.
Jackson, Miss., May 14.
Siege of Vicksburg May 18-July 4.
Assaults on Vicksburg May 19 and 22.
Expedition to Mechanicsburg May 26-June 4.
Advance on Jackson, Miss., July 4–10.
Siege of Jackson July 10–17.
Brandon Station July 19.
Camp at Big Black till November.
Expedition to Canton October 14–20.
Bogue Chitto Creek October 17.
Ordered to Memphis, Tenn., November 12, and duty guarding Railroad till January, 1864.
Expedition to Tallahatchie River February 5–19.
Coldwater Ferry February 8.
Near Senatobia February 8–9.
Wyatt's February 14.
At Memphis till April.
Sturgis' Expedition from Memphis to Ripley, Miss., April 30-May 9.
Sturgis' Expedition from Memphis into Mississippi June 1–13.
Brice's, or Tishamingo Creek, near Guntown, June 10.
Smith's Expedition to Tupelo July 5–21.
Camargo's Cross Roads, Harrisburg, July 13.
Tupelo July 14–15.
Old Town, or Tishamingo Creek, July 15.
Smith's Expedition to Oxford, Miss., August 1–30.
Tallahatchie River August 7–9.
Oxford August 9.
Abbeville August 23.
Moved to Duvall's Bluff, Ark., September 1; thence march through Arkansas and Missouri.
Light Artillery Reserve, Dept. of the Cumberland, to July, 1865.
Mustered out July 15, 1865.

== See also ==
- List of Illinois Civil War Units
- Illinois in the American Civil War
