= Battle of Brice's Cross Roads =

Battle in the American Civil War near Baldwyn, Mississippi

- Part of the American Civil War
- The Battle of Brice's Cross Roads, June 10, 1864
Date	June 10, 1864
Location	Near Baldwyn, Mississippi 34°30′22.0″N 88°43′44.0″W
Result	Confederate victory

Belligerents
Confederate States	United States (Union)

Commanders and leaders
(Confederate States of America) Nathan B. Forrest	(United States) Samuel D. Sturgis

Strength
3,500 cavalry	4,800 infantry 3,300 cavalry 22 guns

Casualties and losses
96 killed 396 wounded	223 killed 394 wounded 1,632 missing/captured 16 guns

The Battle of Brice's Cross Roads, also known as the Battle of Tishomingo Creek or the Battle of Guntown, was fought on Friday, June 10, 1864, near Baldwyn, Mississippi during the American Civil War. A Federal expedition from Memphis, Tennessee, of 4,800 infantry and 3,300 cavalry, under the command of Brigadier-General Samuel D. Sturgis, was defeated by a Confederate force of 3,500 cavalry under the command of Major-General Nathan B. Forrest. Forrest inflicted heavy casualties on the Federal force and captured more than 1,600 prisoners of war, 16 artillery pieces, and wagons loaded with supplies. Although the battle had little impact on the outcome of the war in the western theater, historians have considered Brice's Cross Roads as one of the best examples of Forrest's skill as a master tactician.

== Background ==
In the spring of 1864 Union General William T. Sherman launched his Atlanta Campaign, aimed at capturing one of the South's major cities. Sherman's supply lines depended on the Nashville and Chattanooga Railroad which passed through Tennessee and was vulnerable to Confederate raids. Throughout the spring of 1864, Confederate cavalry forces based in Mississippi led by General Nathan Bedford Forrest launched successful attacks throughout Tennessee, Mississippi, and even as far as Kentucky. Aiming to keep Forrest at a safe distance, General Samuel D. Sturgis was ordered to mount an expedition into Mississippi to counter Forrest and keep him away from the Union lines.

Sturgis set out in May, but only made it as far as Ripley, Mississippi before turning back without encountering Confederate troops. He then left Tennessee again on June 2 with a force approximately 8,000 strong, composed of a division of cavalry with two brigades, led by General Benjamin Grierson, and a division of infantry with four brigades, led by Colonel William L. McMillen. Sturgis had a great deal of discretion in his movements, but was generally expected to "proceed to Corinth, Mississippi, by way of Salem and Ruckersville, capture any force that may be there, then proceed south, destroying the Mobile and Ohio Railroad to Tupelo and Okolona, and as far as possible toward Macon and Columbus."

Forrest was indeed preparing to attack the railroad in Tennessee, and set out from Tupelo on June 1 with troops from the cavalry divisions of Abraham Buford and Phillip Roddey. On June 3, Forrest received a message from General Stephen D. Lee, informing him that Sturgis' column was on the move, recalling Forrest to Tupelo to assemble his cavalry for battle with the Union troops.

== Sturgis' expedition ==
Opposing commanders
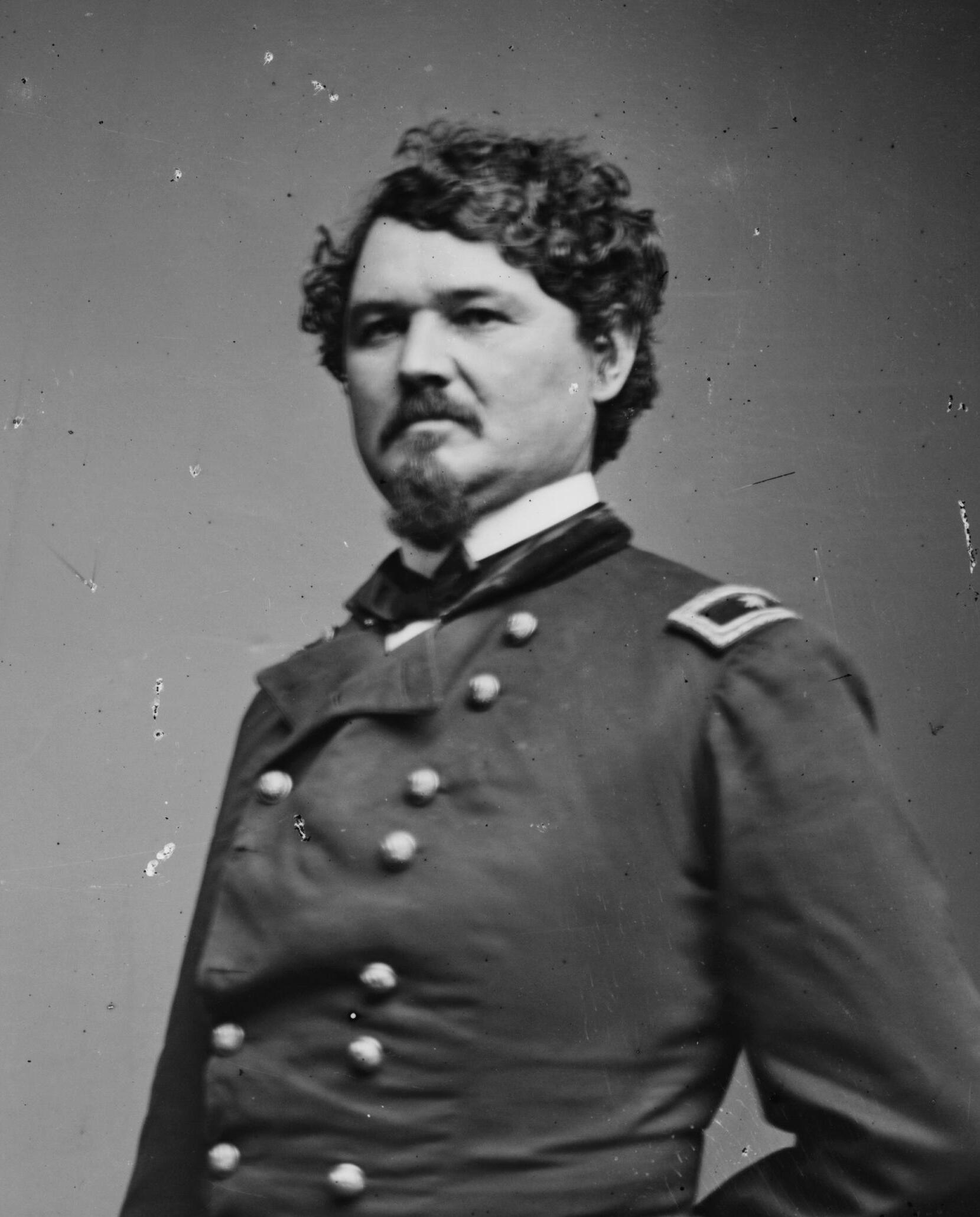
Brig. Gen.
Samuel D. Sturgis, USA

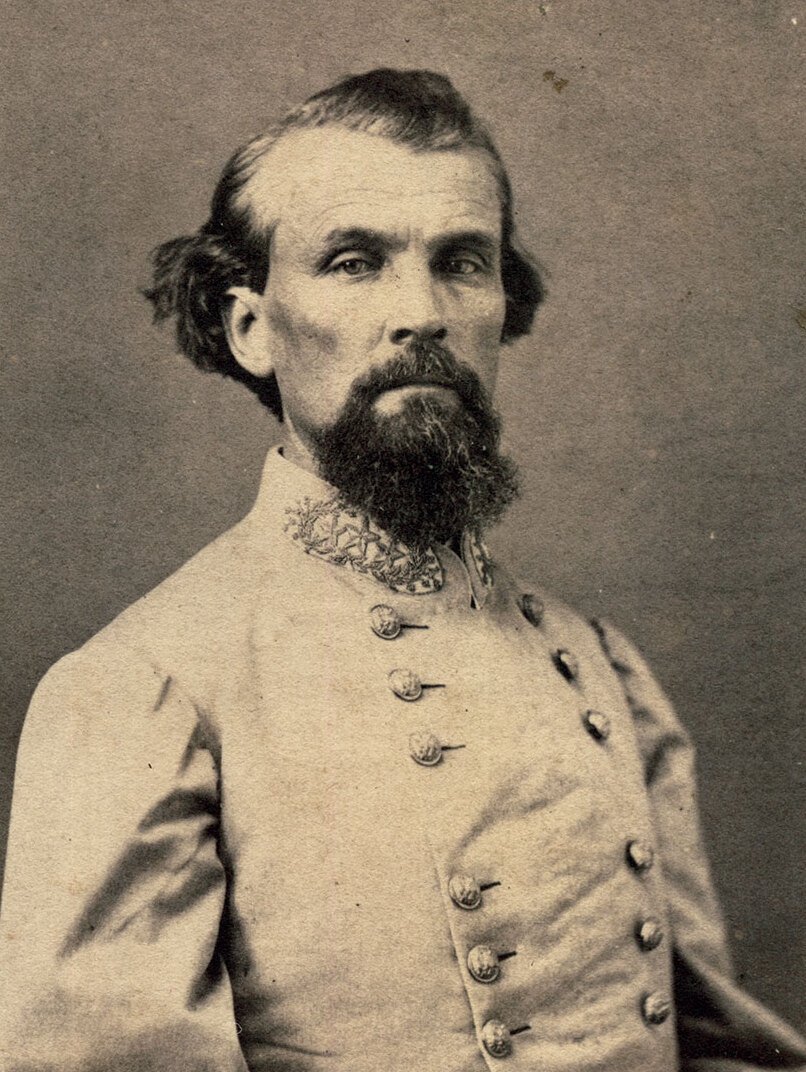
Maj. Gen.
Nathan Bedford Forrest, CSA

Almost immediately, the Union column encountered heavy rain, which turned the roads to mud and brought their progress to a standstill. Cavalry units reported no Confederates near Corinth, so Sturgis proceeded to Ripley, where they skirmished with some Confederate scouts. Upon reaching Ripley, the Union general considered turning back. According to Sturgis, it became "a serious question in my mind as to whether or not I should proceed any farther. The rain still fell in torrents. The artillery and wagons were literally mired down, and the starved and exhausted animals could with difficulty drag them along." Already by June 9, the Union expedition had to send 400 sick or exhausted troops back to Memphis. However, the Union commanders reasoned that they had made no encounter with the enemy as of yet, and by turning back after Ripley they would merely be repeating the incomplete expedition of the month prior. Sturgis then determined to continue onward.

Alerted to the Union troops' movements by their scouts, Forrest's Cavalry Corps assembled at Booneville, Mississippi on June 9. In addition to the troops he had brought from Tupelo, Forrest and General Stephen D. Lee called in brigades led by Colonels Edmund W. Rucker and William A. Johnson to join them. By the evening of the 9th, Forrest was aware of Sturgis' position east of Ripley, and the Confederates made plans to move out before dawn on the 10th to reach Brice's Cross Roads before the Federal troops arrived. Forrest knew the Union troops would struggle due to the weather and mud, but if he could force Sturgis to rush his infantry into battle, they'd arrive at the crossroads exhausted and could be beaten. He explained his plan to Colonel Edmund Rucker before the battle: "Their cavalry will move out ahead of the infantry, and should reach the crossroads three hours in advance. We can whip their cavalry in that time. As soon as the fight opens they will send back to have infantry hurried up. It is going to be hot as hell, and coming on a run for five or six miles over such roads the infantry will be so tired out we will ride over them."

== Battle begins ==
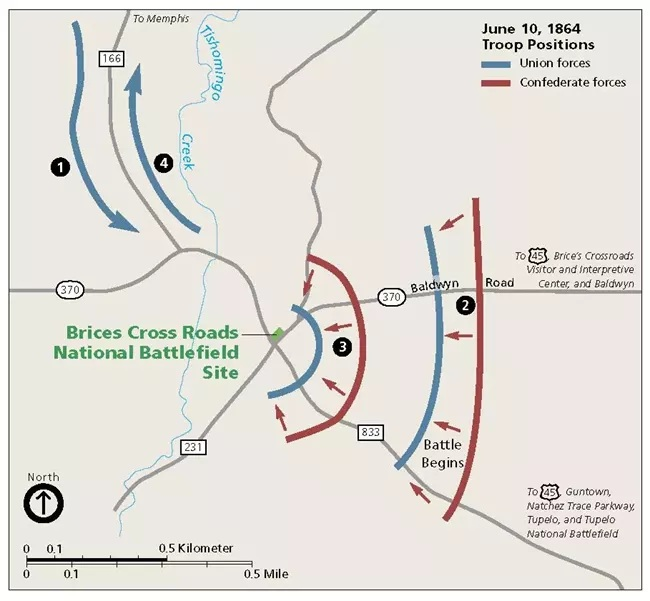
Battle of Brice's Cross Roads, June 10 1864, movements of Union (blue) and Confederate (red) forces. (1) Union cavalry advances on the crossroads in the morning. (2) Grierson's Union cavalry engages Lyon's brigade along the road. (3) Confederates push Union lines back in the afternoon. (4) Union forces retreat northward.

"Everything was going to the devil as fast as it possibly could."

— Colonel William L. McMillen, 95th Ohio

On the morning of June 10th, Union General Benjamin H. Grierson's cavalry troops reached Brice's Cross Roads around 10 AM. The crossroads, where the Baldwin-Pontotoc road crossed the Ripley-Guntown road was named for William Brice, who had a home and store nearby. The country around the crossroads was heavily wooded on either side of the road with very little clear ground, and the route between Ripley and the crossroads passed over a narrow bridge crossing Tishomingo creek. While scouting along the Baldwin road, the cavalry brigade led by Colonel George E. Waring, Jr. encountered Confederate General Hylan B. Lyon's Kentucky brigade, and battle commenced. Grierson dismounted his cavalry to form a line of battle, then sent a message to Sturgis, urging him to rush the infantry up to the crossroads, just as Forrest had planned. Ordering Lyon to hold his position, Forrest then hurried the remainder of his forces towards the crossroads. While Lyon, Rucker, and Johnson were nearby and could quickly join the battle, Bell's brigade and the Confederate artillery were still 25 and 16 miles away, respectively. One of Forrest's innovations was to move his forces rapidly over long distances on horseback, then dismount for battle so they arrived without exhausting themselves by marching on foot.

Sturgis rode on horseback to the crossroads in advance of his infantry, and found the two Union cavalry brigades fiercely engaged in battle. Forrest's troops were each equipped with a pair of six-shot Colt revolvers, which allowed them to fire more rapidly when fighting at close range compared to the Union troops armed with muskets. The Union cavalry was hard pressed by the Confederate troops, but the Union infantry began to arrive around 1:30 PM, allowing Grierson's battered cavalry to withdraw. Hoge's brigade was placed in the rear of Waring on the Baldwin road and Wilkin's brigade was put on the right of Hoge, relieving Winslow's cavalry and covering the Guntown road. Bouton's brigade of Colored troops guarded the rear & wagon train near the Tishomingo creek bridge. Around the same time, Forrest's remaining brigades arrived. Rucker's brigade was sent to the left, Colonel William A. Johnson's brigade was sent to the right, and Buford's division reinforced the center. The Union line was then assaulted simultaneously on both flanks and the center, creating the impression that Forrest had a much larger force present.

Due to the dense woods surrounding the crossroads, the Federal artillery had difficulty finding targets, but once the Confederate artillery batteries arrived Forrest had them brought forward to within pistol range of the Union lines, loaded with canister shot, and fired at point blank range. The effect was devastating, and the Union troops were forced back in the face of this intense fire.

== Federal rout ==
"My whole army became literally an uncontrollable mob."

— General Samuel D. Sturgis

The relentless Confederate attack forced the Union troops at the crossroads to fall back, forming a semi-circular line of battle near Brice's house. In the late afternoon as the battle was raging at the crossroads, the Confederate 2nd Tennessee Cavalry led by Colonel Clark R. Barteau wheeled around the Union flank via another road and assaulted the Federal troops near the bridge crossing Tishomingo creek. Although the attack did not break through the Union lines, the approach of Southerners from an unexpected angle led the Union troops to believe Forrest had enveloped them and sparked panic.

Contrary to orders to hold their positions, the Union army began to turn and flee back towards Ripley. With the Tennesseans still pressing, this retreat bottlenecked at the Tishomingo bridge and chaos ensued. Abandoned wagons and dead pack animals blocked the bridge, leading many Federal troops to swim or ford the creek, at which point they were shot down in large numbers by the Confederates. The brigade of Colored troops, along with the Chippewa of the 9th Minnesota, held their ground near the bridge and inflicted heavy casualties on the Confederates until they too were forced to retreat. Forrest's troops threw the debris off the bridge so they could pursue the Union troops and continue the chase down the road towards Ripley. The fleeing Union troops formed ranks again two miles west of the crossroads, but broke again and continued their escape, discarding many of their weapons and much of their ammunition.

== Retreat to Memphis ==
The Union forces formed a line of battle at Ripley on the morning of June 11 and skirmished with the Confederates again, but once again were forced to flee, abandoning the remainder of their wagon train. Sturgis's forces fled wildly, pursued across six counties and abandoning much of their equipment on their return to Memphis before the exhausted Confederate attackers retired. Forrest's cavalry reported the capture of more than 1,600 Union prisoners, 16 artillery pieces, 1,500 small arms, and 300,000 rounds of ammunition. Since many of the Confederates had rushed to the battle from other parts of Mississippi and Alabama, their horses were exhausted and they could not pursue the Union forces beyond Ripley.

== Aftermath ==
Confederate casualties totaled 493 killed and wounded, while the Union losses of killed, wounded, captured, and missing came to 2,612.

Confederate General Stephen D. Lee called Brice's Cross Roads "one of the signal victories of the war," and Forrest reported that the "victory may be justly considered one of the most complete of the war." Later historians have considered Brice's Cross Roads to be one of the foremost examples of Forrest's expertise that earned him a reputation as one of the most brilliant tacticians of the war. However, the Confederate victory on June 10 had very little impact on the overall strategic picture in the Western theater. While Sturgis had suffered a major defeat, he had achieved his objective of keeping Forrest occupied in Mississippi and away from General Sherman's supply lines in Tennessee. The next month the Union army mounted a larger expedition against Forrest led by General Andrew Jackson Smith. This second foray against Forrest drew his forces into battle at Tupelo on July 14, where the Union forces were more successful, inflicting heavy casualties on Forrest's Corps and killing many of his experienced officers.

Once Sturgis returned to Tennessee, a hearing was held to assess culpability for the defeat. General Sherman wrote to the Secretary of War: "I will have the matter of Sturgis critically examined, and, if he be at fault, he shall have no mercy at my hands." In correspondence with Brigadier-General Sturgis, Colonel Alex Wilkin, commander of the 9th Minnesota, listed several reasons for the loss of the battle. He stated that General Sturgis, knowing that his men were under-supplied, having been on less than half rations, had been hesitant to advance on the enemy, but had done so against his better judgment because he had been ordered to do so. When the cavalry had engaged the enemy, many of the infantry had been ordered to advance double-time to support the cavalry. In their weakened condition, many had fallen out in the advance. Those who did arrive were exhausted at the beginning of the battle, while the Confederates were fresh and well fed, owing to a large supply in their rear. Sturgis was exonerated of any wrongdoing, but for the remainder of the war he was no longer assigned to lead units into combat.

== Order of battle ==
=== Union ===
Brigadier General Samuel D. Sturgis, Commanding.

Division	Brigade	Regiments and Others
Infantry Division; Colonel William L. McMillen	1st Brigade Colonel Alexander Wilken	114th Illinois, Lieutenant Colonel John F. King; 93rd Indiana, Colonel De Witt C. Thomas; 9th Minnesota, Lieutenant Colonel J. F. Marsh; 72nd Ohio Regiment, Lieutenant Colonel Charles G. Eaton; 95th Ohio Regiment, Lieutenant Colonel Jefferson Brumback; Battery "E", 1st Illinois Light Artillery Regiment, Captain John A. Fitch; 6th Independent Battery Indiana Light Artillery, Captain M. Mueller
Infantry Division; Colonel William L. McMillen	2nd Brigade; Colonel George B. Hoge	81st Illinois, Colonel Franklin Campbell; 95th Illinois, Colonel Thomas W. Humphrey; 108th Illinois; 113th Illinois, Lieutenant Colonel George R. Clarke; Battery "B", 2nd Illinois Light Artillery Regiment, Captain F. H. Chapman
Infantry Division; Colonel William L. McMillen	3rd Brigade; United States Colored Troops; Colonel Edward Bouton	55th US Colored Infantry, Lieutenant Colonel Robert Cowden; 59th US Colored Infantry, Major E. M. Lowe; Battery F, 2nd Regiment Light Artillery, US Colored Troops, Captain C. A. Lamberg
Cavalry Division; Brigadier-General Benjamin Grierson	1st Brigade; Colonel George E. Waring, Jr.	3rd Illinois, Captain Andrew B. Kirkbride; 9th Illinois, Lieutenant Colonel Mathew H. Starr; 7th Indiana, Lieutenant Colonel Thomas M. Browne; 4th Missouri, Lieutenant Colonel Gustav von Helmrich; 2nd New Jersey, Colonel Joseph Karge; 19th Pennsylvania, Lieutenant Colonel Joseph C. Hess
Cavalry Division; Brigadier-General Benjamin Grierson	2nd Brigade; Colonel Edward F. Winslow	3rd Iowa, Lieutenant Colonel John W. Noble; 4th Iowa, Major Abial R. Pierce; 10th Missouri, Lieutenant Colonel Frederick W. Benteen; 7th Illinois

=== Confederate ===
Forrest's Cavalry Corps, Major General Nathan Bedford Forrest, Commanding.

Division	Brigade	Regiments and Others
Detached brigade from Chalmers' Division	Rucker's Brigade Colonel Edmund W. Rucker	7th Tennessee, Colonel W.L. Duckworth; 19th Mississippi Battalion, Colonel William Lewis Duff; 18th Mississippi Battalion, Lieutenant Colonel Alexander H. Chalmers
Buford's Division; Brigadier-General Abraham Buford	Lyon's Brigade Brigadier-General Hylan B. Lyon	3rd Kentucky Mounted Infantry, Lieutenant Colonel Gustavus A. C. Holt; 7th Kentucky Mounted Infantry, Major H.S. Hale; 8th Kentucky Mounted Infantry, Captain R.H. Fristoe; 12th Kentucky, Major Thomas S. Tate
Buford's Division; Brigadier-General Abraham Buford	Bell's Brigade; Colonel Tyree H. Bell	2nd Tennessee, Colonel Clark R. Barteau; 16th Tennessee, Colonel Andrew N. Wilson; 18th Tennessee, Colonel John F. Newsom; 20th Tennessee, Colonel Robert M. Russell
Buford's Division; Brigadier-General Abraham Buford	Artillery	Morton's (Tennessee) Battery, Captain John Watson Morton; Rice's (Tennessee) Battery, Captain Thomas W. Rice
Roddey's Division; Brigadier-General Phillip Roddey	Johnson's Brigade; Colonel William A. Johnson	4th Alabama, Lieutenant Colonel Windes; Moreland's Alabama Battalion, Major George; Williams' Alabama Battalion, Captain Doane; Warren's Alabama Battalion, Captain W.H. Warren
Roddey's Division; Brigadier-General Phillip Roddey	Artillery	Company C, 14th Battalion, Georgia Light Artillery, Captain Coleman B. Ferrell

== Battlefield preservation ==
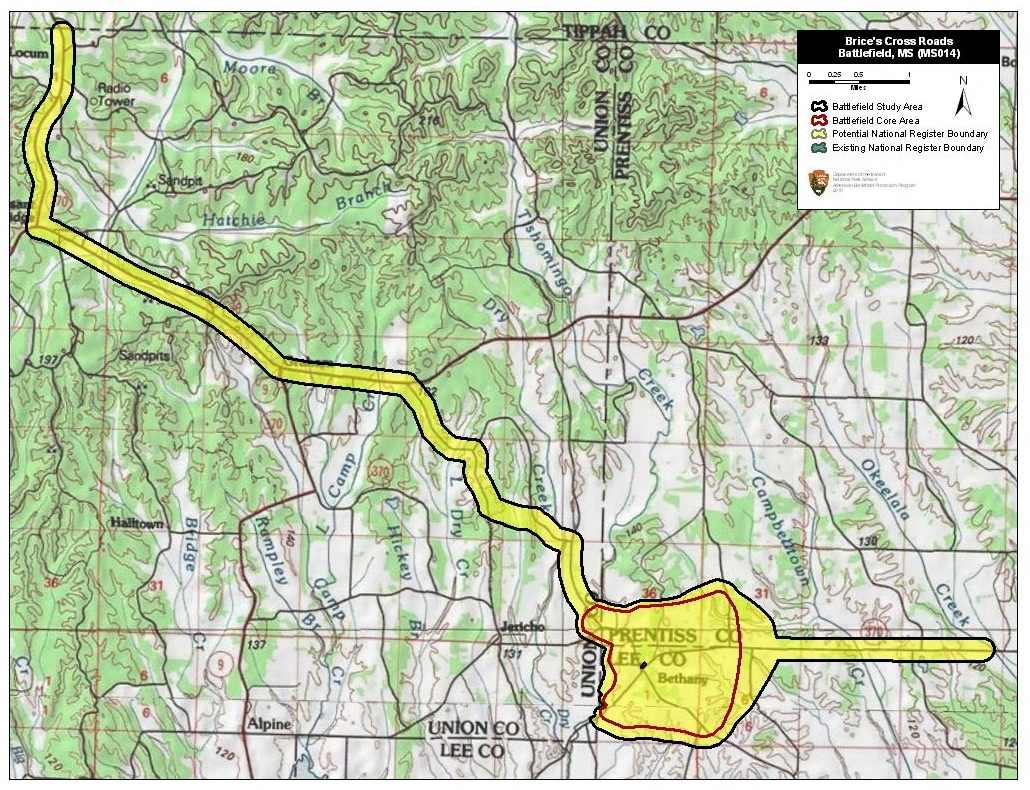
Map of Brice's Cross Roads Battlefield core and study areas by the American Battlefield Protection Program

The Brices Cross Roads National Battlefield Site, established in 1929, commemorates the Battle of Brice's Cross Roads and is considered one of the best preserved of the American Civil War. The National Park Service erected and maintains monuments and interpretive panels on a small 1-acre (4,000 m^{2}) plot at the cross roads. In 1994, concerned citizens organized the Brice's Cross Roads National Battlefield Commission, Inc., to protect and preserve additional battlefield land. With assistance from the Civil War Trust (now the American Battlefield Trust), and the support of federal, state, and local governments, BCNBC has purchased for preservation over 1,420 acres (5.7 km^{2}). Much of the land was purchased from The Agnew Family, who still own some of the property that became the site of the battlefield. The modern Bethany Presbyterian Church is at the southeast side of the cross roads. At the time of the battle this congregation's meeting house was located further south along the Baldwyn Road. Bethany Cemetery, adjacent to the National Park Service monument, predates the American Civil War. Many of the area's earliest settlers are buried here. The graves of more than 90 Confederate soldiers killed at the cross roads are also located in Bethany Cemetery. Federal soldiers were buried in common graves, but were later reinterred in the Memphis National Cemetery.

The American Battlefield Trust and its partners, including BCNBC, have been acquiring and preserving land at Brice's Cross Roads since 1996, when the Trust's predecessor organization, the Association for the Preservation of Civil War Sites (APCWS), acquired and preserved 797.7 acres – about two-thirds of the battlefield – in two purchases. In 2001, two years after the merger of the APCWS and the original Civil War Trust, the new organization, the Civil War Preservation Trust, now known as the American Battlefield Trust, acquired 512.8 additional acres. Additional purchases during the past 16 years have increased the total battlefield land acquired and preserved to 1,500 acres as of late-2021, which is nearly the entire battlefield.

== See also ==
- List of American Civil War battles
- Troop engagements of the American Civil War, 1864
