= 114th Illinois Infantry Regiment =

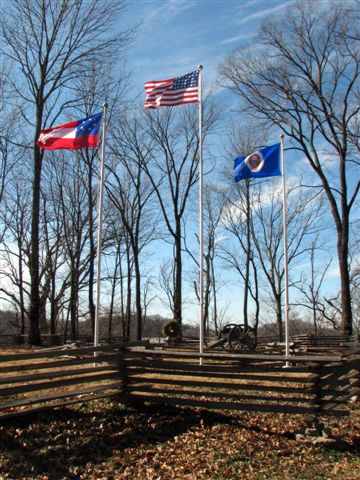
- The 114th Illinois was in the brigade which captured Shy's Hill (shown here) at the Battle of Nashville.
- Active: 18 Sept. 1862 – 15 Aug. 1865
- Country: United States
- Allegiance: (United States) Union; Illinois
- Branch: Union Army
- Type: Infantry
- Size: Regiment
- Engagements: American Civil War; Battle of Jackson (1863); Siege of Vicksburg (1863); Jackson Expedition (1863); Battle of Brices Cross Roads (1864); Battle of Tupelo (1864); Price's Missouri Expedition (1864); Battle of Nashville (1864); Battle of Spanish Fort (1865)

Commanders
- Notable commanders: James W. Judy

The 114th Illinois Infantry Regiment was an infantry regiment from Illinois that served in the Union Army during the American Civil War. Formed in September 1862, the regiment served in Ulysses S. Grant's Central Mississippi campaign, in the Vicksburg campaign, at Brices Cross Roads, at Tupelo, in the 1864 Missouri campaign, at Nashville, and at Spanish Fort. At Nashville, the unit participated in the decisive attack on Shy's Hill. In 1865, the regiment was reassigned as pontoniers. The regiment was mustered out in August 1865.

== Formation ==
The 114th Illinois organized at Camp Butler near Springfield, Illinois and mustered into federal service on 18 September 1862. The original field officers were Colonel James W. Judy of Tallula, Lieutenant Colonel John F. King of Clear Lake, and Major Joseph M. McLane of Cass County. Judy resigned on 4 August 1863 and King assumed command of the regiment, without being promoted to colonel. King resigned on 7 December 1864 and McLane assumed command as major. McLane died on 16 February 1865. Samuel N. Shoup of Springfield was promoted lieutenant colonel in command and John M. Johnson of Beardstown was promoted to major on 22 March 1865. Initially, there was one adjutant, one quartermaster, one surgeon, two assistant surgeons, one chaplain, three sergeant majors, two quartermaster sergeants, one commissary sergeant, two hospital stewards, and four musicians.

Original captains and recruitment areas of the 114th Illinois Infantry Regiment
Company	Captain	Recruitment area
A	John M. Johnson	Cass County
B	Benjamin H. Ferguson	Sangamon County
C	William A. Mallory	Sangamon County
D	Benjamin C. Berry	Cass County
E	Samuel N. Shoup	Sangamon County
F	Absalom Miller	Menard County
G	John L. Wilson	Sangamon County
H	George W. Bailey	Sangamon County
I	John Gibson	Sangamon County
K	Samuel Estill	Menard County

== History ==
=== Vicksburg and Jackson ===
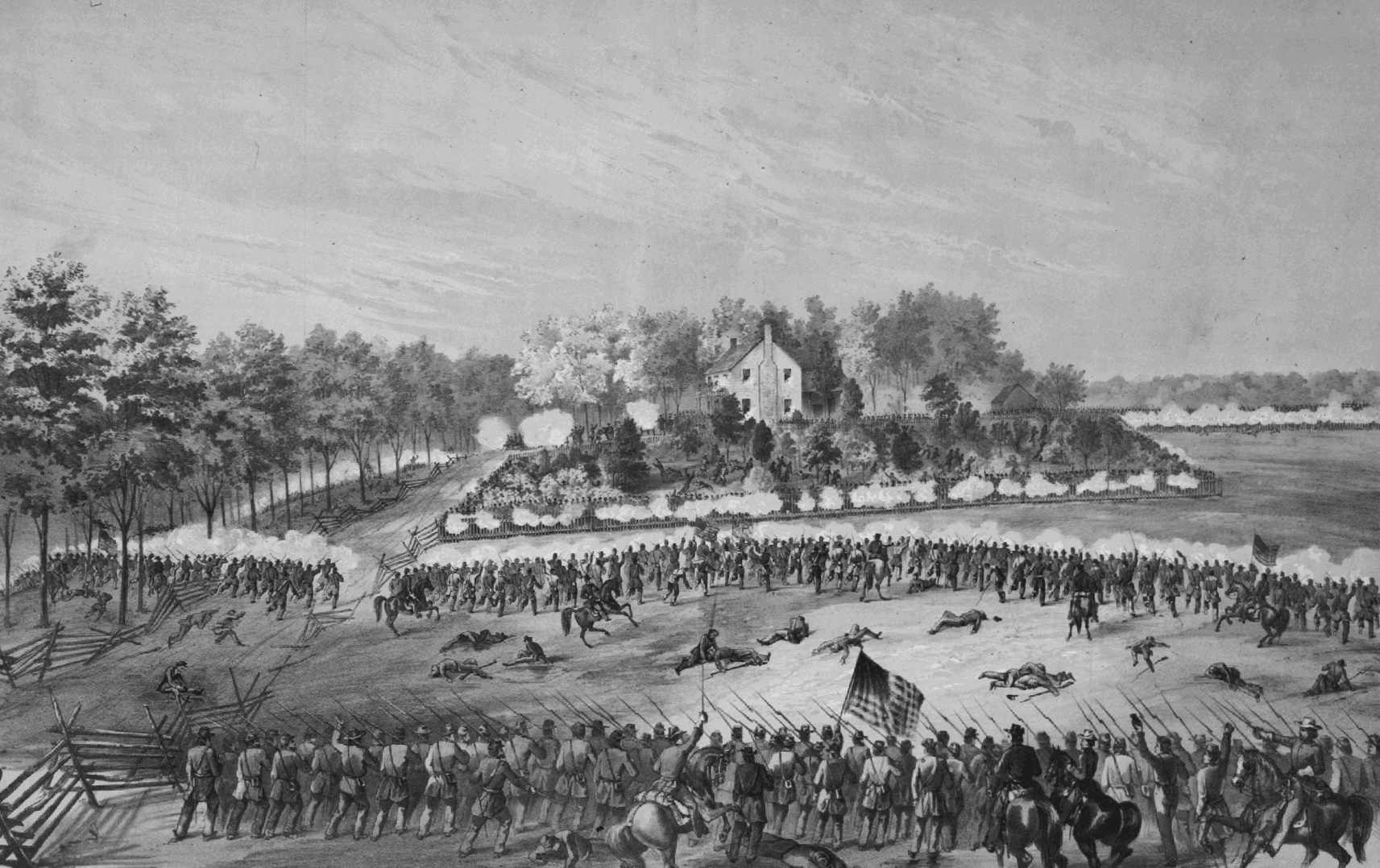
The 114th Illinois Infantry sustained five casualties at the Battle of Jackson, shown here.

The 114th Illinois Infantry left Camp Butler and moved to Memphis, Tennessee on 8–16 November 1862. The regiment was assigned to the 5th Brigade, 5th Division, Right Wing, XIII Corps, Army of the Tennessee in November. The unit remained on picket duty until 26 November when it embarked on Grant's Central Mississippi campaign. The unit transferred to the 3rd Brigade, 1st Division, XIII Corps in December 1862. Brigadier General Ralph Pomeroy Buckland led the 3rd Brigade and Brigadier General James W. Denver commanded the 1st Division. The regiment was assigned to the 3rd Brigade, 8th Division, XVI Corps in January–April 1863. The 114th Illinois reached College Hill, Mississippi (north of Oxford) on 4 December. It stayed there until 23 December when it retreated to Jackson, Tennessee, arriving on 8 January 1863 after a hard march. Buckland led the 3rd Brigade, Brigadier Generals Leonard Fulton Ross and (later) John E. Smith led the 8th Division, and Major General Stephen A. Hurlbut commanded the XVI Corps. Colonel Judy was in temporary command of the brigade from 12 February to 3 April.

After being on duty in Jackson until 9 February 1863, the 114th Illinois moved to Memphis where it guarded the Memphis and Charleston Railroad. On 17 March the regiment boarded river transports at Memphis and traveled down the Mississippi River to Young's Point, Louisiana, arriving on 2 April. The unit camped at Duckport, Louisiana, until 2 May when it joined the Vicksburg campaign. During the campaign, the 114th Illinois under Colonel Judy was in Brigadier General Ralph Pomeroy Buckland's and (later) Colonel William L. McMillen's 1st Brigade, Brigadier General James M. Tuttle's 3rd Division, Major General William Tecumseh Sherman's XV Corps, Grant's Army of the Tennessee. The regiment marched from Grand Gulf to Jackson, Mississippi on 2–14 May. It fought in the Battle of Jackson on 14 May, sustaining losses of 5 men killed and wounded. The Siege of Vicksburg cost the unit 20 men killed and wounded. During the successful siege, which ended on 4 July, the regiment participated in an expedition to Mechanicsburg from 26 May to 4 June.

The 114th Illinois participated in the Jackson Expedition from 4–19 July 1863. There was a skirmish at Birdsong Ferry on the Big Black River on 4–6 July. The siege of Jackson on 10–17 July ended with the retreat and pursuit of Joseph Johnston's Confederate forces which ended at Brandon Station on 19 July. The regiment lost 7 men killed and wounded during the expedition. The unit returned to Vicksburg where it performed picket duty. On 3 September, the regiment was ordered to Oak Ridge where Confederate partisans captured 2 enlisted men and killed Second Lieutenant Joseph A. McClure on 2 October. On 14–20 October, the 114th Illinois participated in an expedition in the direction of Canton including an action at Bogue Chitto Creek on 17 October. The regiment boarded river transports on 20 November to travel upriver to Memphis. From 26 November 1862 to 5 February 1864, the unit performed provost duty at Memphis.

=== Brices Cross Roads and Tupelo ===
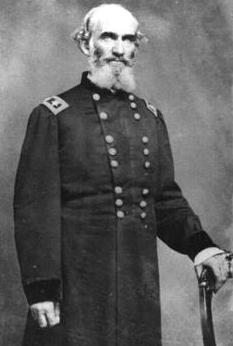
General A. J. Smith

From January to June 1864, the 114th Illinois was assigned to the 1st Brigade, 1st Division, XVI Corps. The regiment participated in an expedition to the Tallahatchie River on 5–19 February. There were skirmishes at Coldwater Ferry on 8 February, Senatobia on 8–9 February, and Wyatt's on the Tallahatchie on 13 February. This expedition enabled Brigadier General William Sooy Smith's cavalry command to cross the Tallahatchie upstream at New Albany. This was followed by provost duty at Memphis. On 30 April, the regiment went on a hard-marching expedition led by Brigadier General Samuel D. Sturgis from Memphis to Ripley, Mississippi that lasted until 9 May.

The 114th Illinois formed part of the 1st Brigade in Sturgis' expedition to Guntown, Mississippi on 1–13 June 1864. Sherman knew the success of his Atlanta campaign depended on keeping Confederate Major General Nathan Bedford Forrest's cavalry from disrupting the Union-controlled railroad between Nashville and Chattanooga, Tennessee. In fact, Forrest's cavalry was headed into Tennessee for a raid at the beginning of June when he was called back to oppose Sturgis. The Union column consisted of 4,800 infantry, 3,300 cavalry, 400 gunners, and 22 cannons. Forrest calculated that his forces could defeat the Union cavalry before it could be supported by the later-arriving infantry. Forrest believed that his cavalry would then beat the Union infantry after it arrived exhausted by a forced march in the summer heat. The Confederate general assumed that the wooded country would hide his inferior numbers from his enemies. The Battle of Brices Cross Roads on 10 June unfolded as Forrest had planned and Sturgis' troops were routed. Union casualties numbered 2,612 men, 18 cannons, and 250 wagons while the Confederates counted 493 killed and wounded. The 114th Illinois went into battle with 397 men and lost 205 men killed, wounded, and missing. Three officers were wounded and two were captured, and the assistant surgeon was killed.

After the fiasco at Brices Cross Roads, Sherman feared that Forrest would mount a raid against his supply line in middle Tennessee. At this time, a force led by Major General Andrew Jackson Smith reached Memphis and Sherman determined to use it against Forrest. From June to December 1864, the 114th Illinois was assigned to the 1st Brigade, 1st Division, XVI Corps. On 5–21 July, the regiment joined Smith's Expedition to Tupelo, Mississippi. The fighting included a clash at Camargo's Cross Roads on 13 July, the Battle of Tupelo on 14–15 July, and an action at Old Town Creek on 15 July. Smith's column included 14,000 men and 24 guns. To oppose him, the Confederates under Forrest and Lieutenant General Stephen D. Lee scraped together 9,000 troops and 20 guns. On the morning of 13 July, Smith outmaneuvered the Confederates and suddenly marched toward Tupelo. Discovering the move, Forrest's cavalry attacked the Union column but was repulsed. That day, the 114th Illinois helped drive off one attack and was commended by its brigade commander. On 14 July, Smith's troops repelled repeated Confederate assaults on its ridgetop position. The next day, after Smith withdrew toward Memphis, Forrest attacked again at Old Town Creek but was driven off. During the various actions, Smith's column sustained 714 casualties while the Confederates reported 1,326 killed and wounded. The 114th Illinois suffered 40 casualties during the expedition.

=== Nashville and Mobile ===
The 114th Illinois went on Smith's expedition to Oxford, Mississippi on 1–30 August 1864, including actions on the Tallahatchie River on 7–9 August and at Abbeville on 23 August. The regiment moved to DeValls Bluff, Arkansas, on 2 September. The unit took part in the pursuit of Price's Missouri Expedition from 24 September to 16 November 1864. In September, the regiment camped at Brownsville, Arkansas. From there, the unit marched to Cape Girardeau, Missouri in 17 days while on 10 day's rations. On 6 October, the soldiers boarded river transports and traveled to Jefferson City, then took the railroad as far as Otterville. From Otterville they marched to Kansas City. Ordered to report to St. Louis, the regiment reached there on 15 November. During the Missouri campaign, Lieutenant Colonel King was ill and Major McLean led the regiment. From there, the unit traveled to Nashville on 24–30 November.

From December 1864 to February 1865, the 114th Illinois formed part of the 1st Brigade, 1st Division, Detachment Army of the Tennessee, Army of the Cumberland. At the Battle of Nashville on 15–16 December 1864, the 114th Illinois was commanded by Captain John M. Johnson and belonged to McMillen's 1st Brigade, Brigadier General John McArthur's 1st Division, Smith's Army of the Tennessee Detachment, Major General George Henry Thomas's Army of the Cumberland. On the first day, Thomas planned to use Smith's troops for his main assault against the Confederate left flank. However, an early morning fog caused the attack to be badly delayed. At 2:15 pm, Brigadier General Edward Hatch ordered Colonel Datus Coon's dismounted cavalry brigade to attack Redoubt No. 5. Seeing this, McArthur sent McMillen's brigade to attack the same objective. The redoubt with its two cannons was quickly captured, but it soon came under fire from Redoubt No. 4 to the north. McArthur sent his 2nd Brigade to charge Redoubt No. 4. Hatch, Coon, and McMillen had the same idea and their winded men made a second rush. After a struggle, Redoubt No. 4 with four cannons was also overrun. Soon McArthur's 3rd Brigade assaulted Redoubts No. 2 and 3, which were also seized. When other Union formations joined the attack, the Confederate position crumbled.

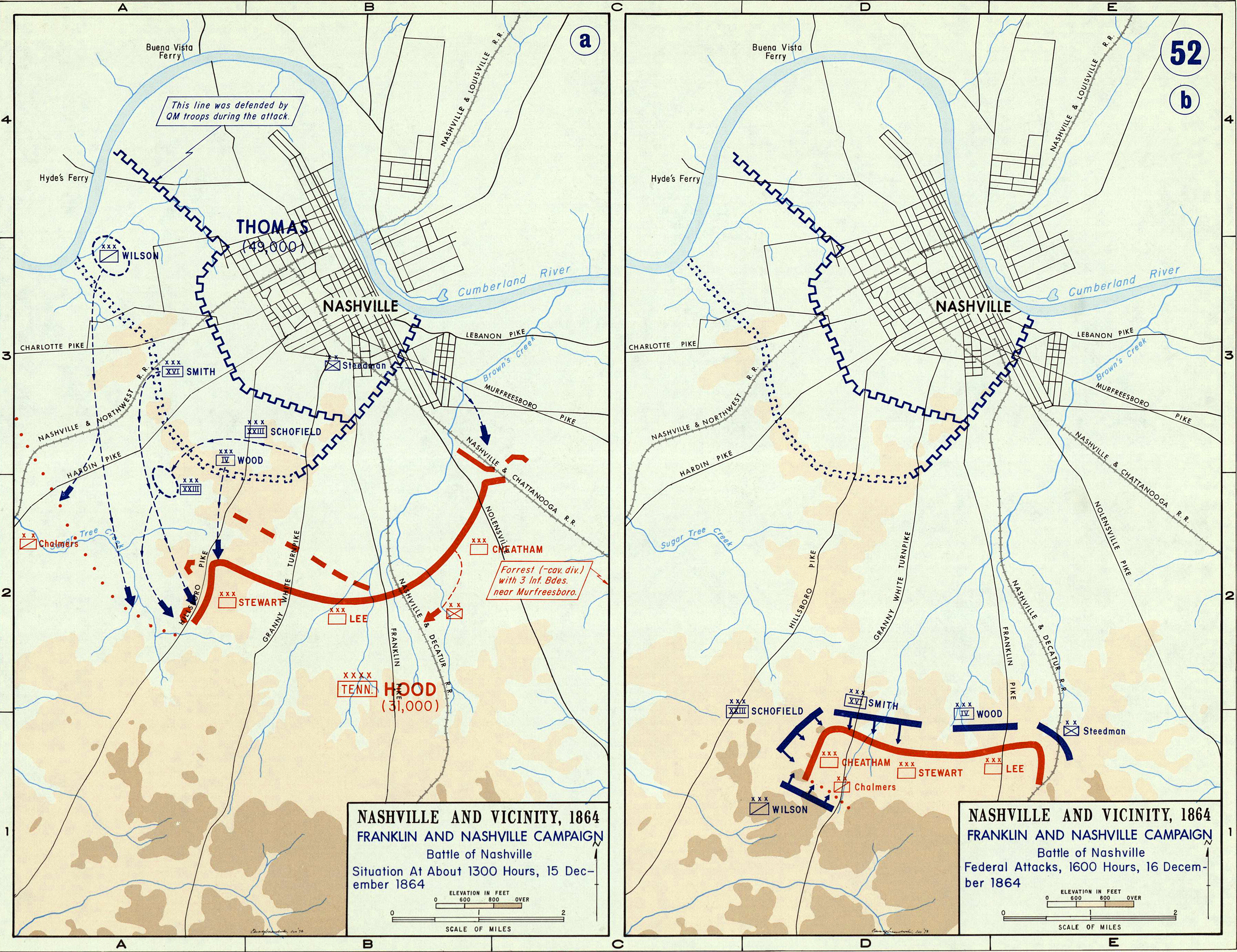
Battle of Nashville, 15 Dec. (left) and 16 Dec. (right)

That evening, Lieutenant General John Bell Hood managed to rally his Confederate army in a new position farther back with both flanks anchored on hills. On 16 December there were again maddening delays getting the Union assault organized. Major General John Schofield, commander of the Union XXXIII Corps, which was now on Smith's right flank, was convinced that he was about to be attacked and refused to budge. McArthur observed that the Confederate positions on Shy's Hill were weak and not sited on the military crest. Unable to get Major General Darius N. Couch to cooperate with him in an assault, at 2:30 pm McArthur ordered McMillen's brigade to move 500 yd (457 m) to its right, across the front of Couch's XXIII Corps division. There was another delay getting Cogswell's Battery Illinois Light Artillery resupplied with ammunition, but just before 4:00 pm, McMillen's brigade started its attack. McMillen's 1,500 men stormed Shy's Hill and, after a savage melee, broke the Confederate line. McMillen's troops captured 85 officers, 1,533 men, 4 colors, and 8 cannons. With its front torn open, the Confederate army collapsed as McArthur's remaining two brigades and other divisions joined the assault. One of McMillen's Illinois soldiers recorded that when the men realized what they had done, they were, "shouting, yelling, and acting like maniacs for a while". (Note: The 114th Illinois was the only Illinois infantry regiment in McMillen's brigade.) As the 114th Illinois advanced from Shy's Hill, it came upon a well-stocked smokehouse which the men proceeded to plunder. "The lady of the house courageous and with a long board smites ye Yanks right and left making several ears ring," wrote one soldier. "The boys yell but let her pound at will." The regiment lost 15 men killed and wounded at Nashville.

The 114th Illinois participated in the pursuit of the defeated Confederate army on 17–28 December 1864. After marching to Clifton, Tennessee, the regiment traveled on river transports to Eastport, Mississippi, where it was reassigned as XVI Corps pontoniers. The troops stayed in Eastport until 9 February 1865 when they were ordered to New Orleans, which they reached on 22 February. The unit boarded an ocean-going steamer at Lake Pontchartrain bound for the Mobile campaign. It reached the area on 23 March, after staging at Dauphin Island on 3 March. During the campaign, the 114th Illinois Pontoniers under Major Johnson were assigned directly to XVI Corps under A. J. Smith. The unit was present at the Battle of Spanish Fort which was evacuated by its Confederate garrison on the night of 8 April 1865. The regiment was ordered to attack Forts Tracy and Huger in pontoon boats but the Confederate garrisons already abandoned both positions. After Mobile surrendered, the unit marched to Montgomery, Alabama, reaching there on 24 April. The 114th Illinois spanned the Alabama River with a pontoon bridge and remained guarding it until 17 July, when the unit was ordered to Vicksburg.

The 114th Illinois mustered out of federal service on 3 August 1865. The soldiers reached Camp Butler on 7 August and received their final pay and discharge on 15 August. The regiment lost 2 officers and 45 enlisted men killed and mortally wounded, while 4 officers and 159 enlisted men died by disease, for a total of 210 deaths. Altogether 1,613 officers and enlisted men served in the regiment during the war.

=== Documentation ===

The Journal & The 114th, 1861 to 1865 (1979) is a book that contains the history of the 114th Illinois Volunteer Infantry Regiment during the American Civil War and newspaper articles of the 1860s. Researched and written by John L. Satterlee, it contains stories written by the Illinois State Journal editors that were submitted by the "Observer" and others as well as many things that went on in Springfield, Sangamon County, Illinois and the world during the Civil War.

A thousand copies were printed, all in hardback and each signed by the author.

== Reactivation ==
The 114th Illinois Volunteer Infantry Regiment Reactivated is a non-profit organization. The purpose of the organization is to "foster patriotism, the Lincoln tradition and the historic past of the United States and the State of Illinois". Members of the 114th Illinois Reactivated perform functions that are patriotic, ceremonial, civic, athletic and charitable. On 10 January 1969, the 114th was proclaimed to be reactivated by Governor Samuel H. Shapiro of Illinois.

== See also ==
- List of Illinois Civil War Units
- Illinois in the American Civil War
