= 59th United States Colored Infantry Regiment =

American Civil War infantry regiment

59th United States Colored Infantry
- Active: March 11, 1864 - January 31, 1866
- Country: United States
- Allegiance: Union
- Branch: Infantry
- Engagements: Battle of Brice's Crossroads

The 59th United States Colored Infantry was an infantry regiment that served in the Union Army during the American Civil War. The regiment was composed of African American enlisted men commanded by white officers and was authorized by the Bureau of Colored Troops which was created by the United States War Department on May 22, 1863.

== Service ==
The 59th U.S. Colored Infantry was organized from the 1st Tennessee Infantry (African Descent) on March 11, 1864, for three-year service under the command of Colonel Edward Bouton.

The regiment was attached to 1st Colored Brigade, District of Memphis, Tennessee, Department of the Tennessee, to June 1864. 3rd Brigade, Infantry Division, Sturgis' Expedition, to June 1864. 1st Colored Brigade, District of Memphis, District of West Tennessee, to February 1865. Fort Pickering, Defenses of Memphis, Tennessee, District of West Tennessee, to July 1865. 2nd Brigade, District of West Tennessee, to September 1865. Department of Tennessee to January 1866.

The 59th U.S. Colored Infantry mustered out of service January 31, 1866.

== Detailed service ==
Post and garrison duty at Memphis, Tennessee, until June 1864. Sturgis' Expedition from Memphis into Mississippi June 1–13. Battle of Brice's Cross Roads, Guntown, June 10. Ripley June 11. Davis Mill June 12. Smith's Expedition to Tupelo, Mississippi, July 5–21. Near Ripley July 7. Pontotoc July 11–12. Camargo's Cross Roads, Harrisburg, July 13. Tupelo July 14–15. Old Town Creek July 15. Repulse of Forrest's attack on Memphis August 21, 1864. Post and garrison duty at Memphis, Tennessee, and in the District of West Tennessee until January 1866.

== Commanders ==
- Colonel Edward Bouton

== See also ==
- List of United States Colored Troops Civil War Units
- United States Colored Troops
