= 19th Pennsylvania Cavalry Regiment =

19th Pennsylvania Cavalry Regiment 180th Volunteers
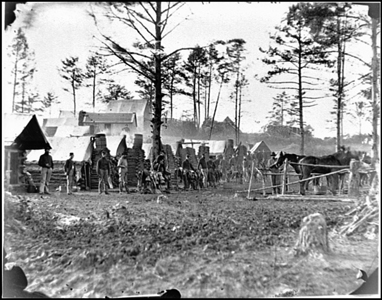
- Active: 2 June 1863 – 14 May 1866
- Country: United States
- Allegiance: (United States) Union Pennsylvania
- Branch: Union Army
- Type: Cavalry
- Size: Regiment
- Engagements: American Civil War; Battle of Okolona (1864); Battle of Brices Cross Roads (1864); Battle of Byram's Ford (1864); Battle of Nashville (1864)

The 19th Pennsylvania Cavalry Regiment was a cavalry unit from Pennsylvania in the Union Army during the American Civil War. The regiment organized at Philadelphia between June and October 1863. After reporting at Washington, D.C. in November 1863, the unit was sent to fight in the Western Theater of the American Civil War. The regiment fought at Okolona, Brices Cross Roads, and Nashville, while one company was in action at Byram's Ford in Missouri. Thereafter, the regiment was assigned to occupation duties in Louisiana and Texas before being mustered out in May 1866.

== History ==
=== Organization ===
Organized at Philadelphia June to October, 1863. Moved to Washington, D.C., November 5 and 8, 1863, thence to Eastport, Miss., November 13 and joined Gen. A. J. Smith at Columbus, Ky., December 3. Attached to District of Columbus, 6th Division, 16th Army Corps, Dept. Tennessee, December, 1863. Waring's Cavalry Brigade, 16th Corps, to January, 1864. 1st Brigade, 1st Cavalry Division, 16th Corps, to June, 1864. 1st Brigade, 2nd Cavalry Division, District of West Tennessee, to November, 1864. 1st Brigade, 7th Division, Cavalry Corps, Military Division, Mississippi, to February, 1865. 2nd Brigade, 7th Division, Cavalry Corps, Military Division Mississippi, to March, 1865. Cavalry Brigade, District of Baton Rouge, La., Dept. Gulf, to August, 1865. Dept. Louisiana, to December, 1865. Dept. of Texas to May, 1866.

=== Service ===
Moved to Union City, Tenn., December 6, 1863. Expedition from Union City to Trenton January 22–24, 1864. Moved to Colliersville January 28-February 5. Smith's Expedition from Colliersville to Okolona, Miss., February 11–26. Egypt Station February 19. West Point February 20. Ivy Farm, Okolona, February 22. Tallahatchie River February 23. Operations against Forest in West Tennessee March 16-April 14. Cypress Creek and near Raleigh April 3. Near Raleigh April 9. Sturgis' Expedition from Memphis to Ripley, Miss., April 30-May 9. Sturgis' Expedition to Guntown, Miss., June 1–13. Corinth June 6. Ripley June 7. Brice's or Tishamingo Creek near Guntown June 10. Waldron Bridge June 11. Davis' Mills June 12. Expedition from Memphis to Grand Gulf, Miss., July 4–24. Near Bolivar July 6. Blackwater July 10. Port Gibson July 14. Grand Gulf July 16–17. Smith's Expedition to Oxford, Miss., August 1–30. Hurricane Creek August 9. A detachment moved to Little Rock, Ark., and on expedition against Price, Nonconah Creek, November 20 (Co. "F"). Moved to Nashville, Tenn., November 26-December 3. Owen's Cross Roads December 1. Battle of Nashville December 15–16. Hollow Tree Gap, Franklin and West Harpeth River December 17. King's Hill near Pulaski December 25. Sugar Creek December 26. At Gravelly Springs, Ala., until February 8, 1865. Moved to Vicksburg, Miss., thence to New Orleans, La., February 8-March 9, and to Baton Rouge, La., March 20. Duty there until August 12. Moved to Alexandria August 12. (Consolidated to 6 Companies February 4, 1865, and to 4 Companies June 13.) Company "A" duty at Shreveport until December 15, then at Marshall, Texas, until April, 1866. Company "B" at Alexandria until March, 1866. Company "C" at Monroe until December 15, 1865, then at Jefferson, Texas, until April, 1866. Company "D" at Natchitoches until March, 1866. Companies "A" and "C" to New Orleans April, 1866. Companies "B" and "D" to New Orleans March, 1866. Provost duty there until May. Mustered out May 14, 1866.

Regiment lost during service 15 Enlisted men killed and mortally wounded and 3 Officers and 109 Enlisted men by disease. Total 124.

== See also ==
- List of Pennsylvania Civil War units
