= Andrew Jackson Smith =

American military officer (1815–1897)

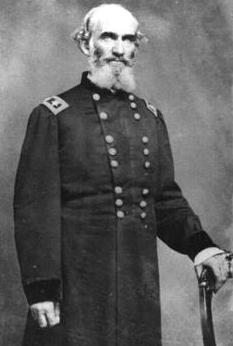
- Smith during the Civil War
- Born: April 28, 1815; Bucks County, Pennsylvania
- Died: January 30, 1897 (aged 81); St. Louis, Missouri
- Burial place: Bellefontaine Cemetery, St. Louis, Missouri
- Military career
- Allegiance: United States of America; Union
- Branch: United States Army; Union Army
- Service years: 1838–1869
- Rank: Major General
- Nickname: Whiskey
- Commands: XVI Corps
- Conflicts: Mexican–American War: Capture of Tucson; Indian Wars; American Civil War: Vicksburg campaign; Red River campaign; Price's raid; Smith's Expedition to Tupelo; Battle of Tupelo; Battle of Nashville

Andrew Jackson Smith (April 28, 1815 – January 30, 1897) was a United States Army general during the American Civil War, rising to the command of a corps. He was most noted for his victory over Confederate General Stephen D. Lee at the Battle of Tupelo, Mississippi, on July 14, 1864.

== Early life ==
Smith was born in rural Bucks County, Pennsylvania. He graduated from the United States Military Academy in 1838 ranking 36th in a class of 45 graduates. He entered West Point with his kin Langdon C. Easton of St. Louis, who was Chief Quartermaster of General William T. Sherman's 100,000-man army. Smith was engaged on active service on the frontier in the Southwest and in the Mexican–American War, in the latter briefly commanding the Mormon Battalion. He later fought against Native Americans in the Washington and Oregon territories. He was successively promoted to first lieutenant in 1845, captain in 1847, and major in early 1861.

== Civil War ==
At the outbreak of the Civil War, Smith became a colonel of the 2nd California Volunteer Cavalry in the Union Army, rising early in 1862 to the rank of brigadier general in the United States Volunteers and to the chief command of the cavalry in the Department of the Missouri. From March through July, he served in the same capacity in the Department of the Mississippi. Assigned afterwards to the Army of the Tennessee, he took part in the Battle of Chickasaw Bayou and the capture of Arkansas Post. He commanded a division of the XIII Corps in the Vicksburg campaign. Later, he led a division of the XVI Corps in the Red River campaign of Maj. Gen. Nathaniel Banks. He received the brevet rank of colonel in the Regular Army for his services at the action of Pleasant Hill.

Smith became a lieutenant colonel in the Regular Army in July 1864, to rank from May 9. On May 14, 1864 President Abraham Lincoln appointed Smith a major general in the volunteers, to rank from May 12, 1864, the date of the United States Senate's confirmation of President Lincoln's May 9, 1864 nomination of Smith for the appointment.

In July, 1864, Smith led an expedition into Mississippi. On July 14–15, he defeated Confederate Lt. Gen. Stephen D. Lee at the Battle of Tupelo, where Lee took over general command over the Confederate forces on the field from General Nathan Bedford Forrest.

In retaliation for Forrest's raid on Fort Pillow, north of Memphis, Union General Andrew Jackson Smith, with a large military force, arrived in Oxford, Mississippi on August 24, 1864, and in one day burned the Lafayette County Courthouse, all the business houses on the Square, except one, and all homes in the immediate area.

During the autumn of 1864, Smith lead Union troops against Confederate Maj. Gen. Sterling Price during Price's raid into Missouri. Smith was then summoned to join forces with Maj. Gen. George Henry Thomas at Nashville, Tennessee, then threatened by the advance of Confederate Lt. Gen. John Bell Hood. Smith bore a conspicuous share in the crowning victory at the Battle of Nashville leading his troops past the Confederates' south flank. He commanded the XVI corps in the final campaign against Mobile, Alabama, in 1865.

On April 10, 1866, President Andrew Johnson nominated Smith for appointment to the grade of brigadier general in the United States Army (Regular Army), to rank from March 13, 1865, for his services at the Battle of Tupelo and the United States Senate confirmed the appointment on May 4, 1866. On the same dates, President Johnson nominated and the United States Senate confirmed Johnson's appointment of Smith as brevet major general in the Regular Army, to rank from March 13, 1865, for his success in leading his men at the Battle of Nashville. The Senate reconfirmed this appointment on July 14, 1866, after recalling the confirmation and return of the nomination to President Johnson for possible readjustment of the date.

== Postbellum life ==
Smith resigned his volunteer commission and was mustered out of the volunteers on January 15, 1866. He then became colonel of the U.S. 7th Cavalry Regiment, serving in the American West. He retired from the military service in April 1869 to become postmaster of St. Louis, Missouri, where he died on January 30, 1897. He was buried at Bellefontaine Cemetery in St. Louis.

== See also ==
- List of American Civil War generals (Union)
