= Battle of Tupelo =

1864 battle of the American Civil War

- Part of the American Civil War
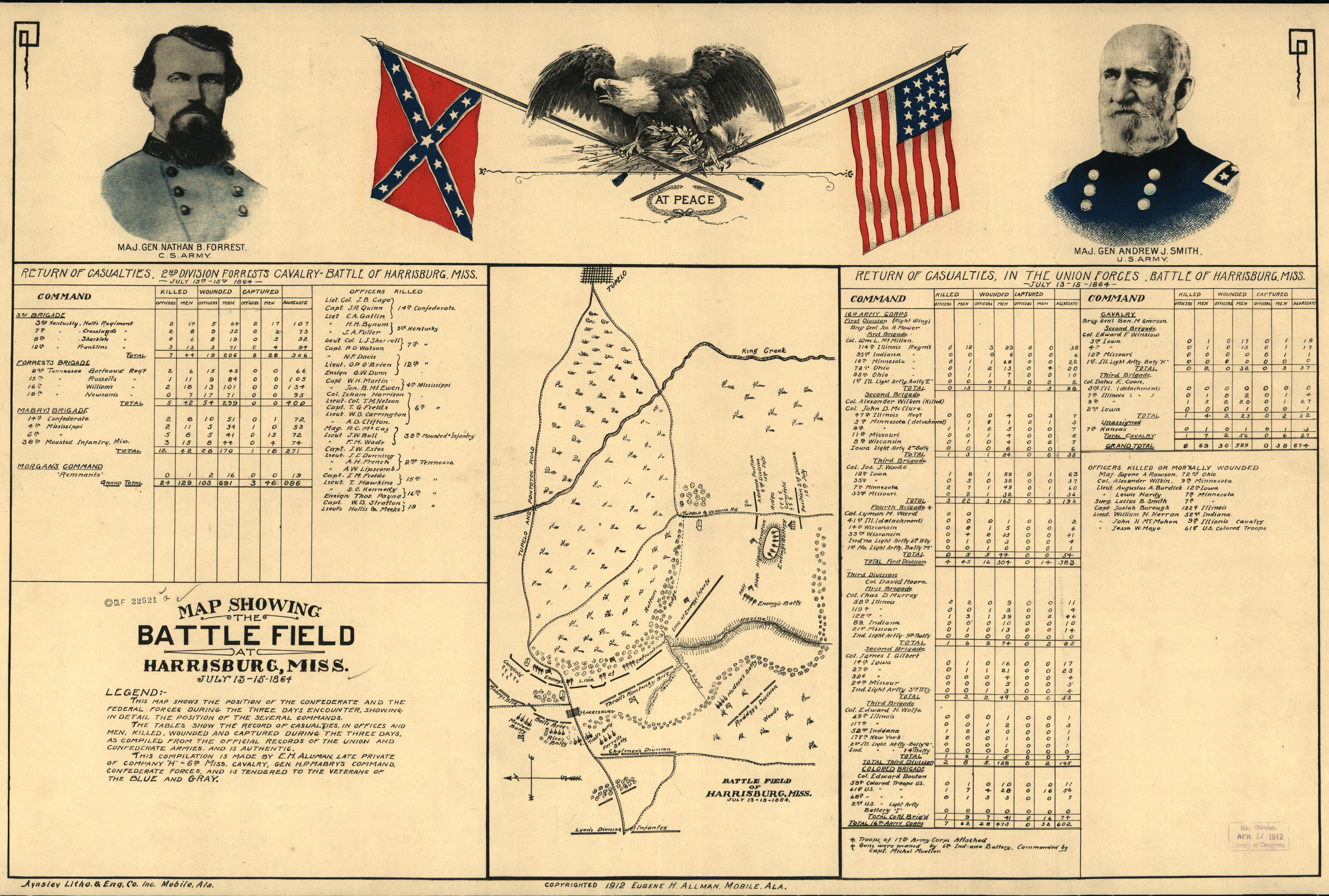
- 1912 map of the Tupelo battlefield, with roster of opposing forces and inset portraits of N.B. Forrest (left) and A.J. Smith (right).
Date	July 14–15, 1864
Location	Near Tupelo, Mississippi 34°15′20.4″N 88°44′13.2″W
Result	Union victory

Belligerents
United States (Union)	Confederate States

Commanders and leaders
(United States) Andrew J. Smith	(Confederate States of America) Stephen D. Lee: Nathan B. Forrest (WIA)

Units involved
Right Wing, 16th Army Corps	Forrest's Cavalry Corps

Strength
13,000 infantry 3,000 cavalry 24 guns	2,100 infantry 7,000 cavalry 20 guns

Casualties and losses
69 dead and 533 wounded or missing	215 dead and 1,125 wounded or missing

The Battle of Tupelo, also known as the Battle of Harrisburg, was a battle of the American Civil War fought July 14–15, 1864, near Tupelo, Mississippi. Union troops were sent from Memphis, Tennessee into Mississippi to pursue Confederate General Nathan Bedford Forrest's Cavalry Corps, which had defeated a larger Union force at the Battle of Brice's Cross Roads the month prior. Outside the town of Tupelo on July 14, the outnumbered Confederate forces made a badly-coordinated frontal assault on the fortified Union lines, suffering heavy losses. While Forrest's Cavalry survived the battle, Union General Andrew J. Smith's victory at Tupelo ensured the safety of Sherman's supply lines during the Atlanta campaign.

== Background ==
"I will order them to make up a force and go out and follow Forrest to the death, if it cost 10,000 lives and breaks the Treasury. There never will be peace in Tennessee till Forrest is dead."

— General William T. Sherman, June 15, 1864.

After the Vicksburg Campaign of 1863 and the Meridian campaign of early 1864, the attention of the Union army and its leading generals shifted to fighting in Virginia and Georgia. General Sherman's campaign in Georgia depended on the vital supply line of the Nashville & Chattanooga Railroad, which passed through Tennessee. Confederate General Nathan Bedford Forrest's Cavalry Corps posed a threat to Sherman's lines, and Forrest had already proven himself to be an innovator in cavalry tactics. Although his forces were usually outnumbered by Union troops, Forrest was a pioneer of mobile warfare, striking fast against vulnerable infrastructure and supply depots, and using aggressive tactics to psychologically intimidate stronger opponents.

In June, a Union force was sent into North Mississippi to counter Forrest, but the larger Union army was soundly defeated by Forrest at the Battle of Brice's Cross Roads on June 10. To deal with this threat, General Sherman ordered that another expedition be mounted against Forrest's Cavalry, to be led by Andrew Jackson Smith and Joseph A. Mower, with the objective of drawing Forrest into open battle and killing him if possible.

== Prelude ==
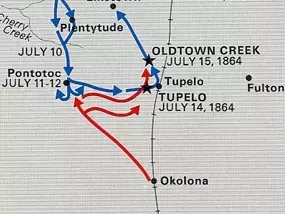
Movements of Union (blue) and Confederate (red) forces leading up to the July 14-15 Battle of Tupelo.

Following his victory at Brice's Cross Roads, Forrest had established a base at Tupelo, Mississippi in mid June. On July 5 the right wing of the Union 16th Army Corps, commanded by Major-General Andrew J. Smith, advanced into north Mississippi from La Grange, Tennessee. The Union columns proceeded without encountering major resistance until Pontotoc, where the advance was checked by Confederate Brigadier-General James R. Chalmers. Union and Confederate forces clashed on July 12, with Forrest's advance guard ordered to stall the Union troops while the Confederate preparations for battle were made near Okolona. Lieutenant-General Stephen D. Lee also joined the Confederate forces and assumed general command, to Forrest's deep resentment. Forrest often clashed with his commanding officers, and he resented that Lee had recently been promoted over him, despite Forrest's recent victory at Brice's Cross Roads. Lee later said that he offered Forrest the overall command at Tupelo, but Forrest refused and insisted that Lee as the ranking officer should lead the Confederate force. Rather than wait for an opportune moment to strike, General Lee wished to bring the Union forces to battle quickly so he could dispatch part of his force to reinforce Mobile, Alabama, where another attack was expected imminently.

On July 13 both Union columns broke off from their southward journey and suddenly turned east toward Tupelo. This move was unexpected as the Confederates had planned to meet the Federal force further south at Okolona. Lee then moved with the divisions of Chalmers and Brigadier-General Abraham Buford to attack Smith's flank, while Forrest with Mabry's Brigade, attacked the Federal rear. A running fight was kept up for ten miles along the Pontotoc-Tupelo road, but without any considerable advantage to either side except for a dash made upon the Federal wagon train by Chalmers with Rucker's Brigade near Barrow's Shop. The Confederates had possession of the Union wagon train for a time and killed all the mules, so that the Union forces were compelled to abandon and burn seven wagons, a caisson and two ambulances, but superior numbers soon compelled the Southerners to retire. Smith then reached the ghost town of Harrisburg, two miles west of Tupelo, and began to reinforce his position for battle the next morning.

== Opposing forces ==
Union General A.J. Smith's force, the Right Wing of the 16th Army Corps consisted of two divisions of infantry led by General Joseph A. Mower and Colonel David Moore, one brigade of United States Colored Troops infantry led by Col. Edward Bouton, and one division of cavalry led by General Benjamin Grierson. The Union force totaled approximately 14,000 men.

The Confederate forces, led by Lieutenant General Stephen D. Lee, included three divisions of Forrest's Cavalry Corps, commanded by Brigadier Generals James Ronald Chalmers, Abraham Buford, and Phillip Roddey, along with an infantry division led by General Hylan B. Lyon. The Confederate units engaged at Tupelo were all normally cavalry regiments, but the entirety of the force was dismounted for the battle of July 14. The Confederate force totaled around 7,500 men, with a significant number of soldiers detailed to non-combat roles as horse holders for the dismounted troops.

== Battle ==
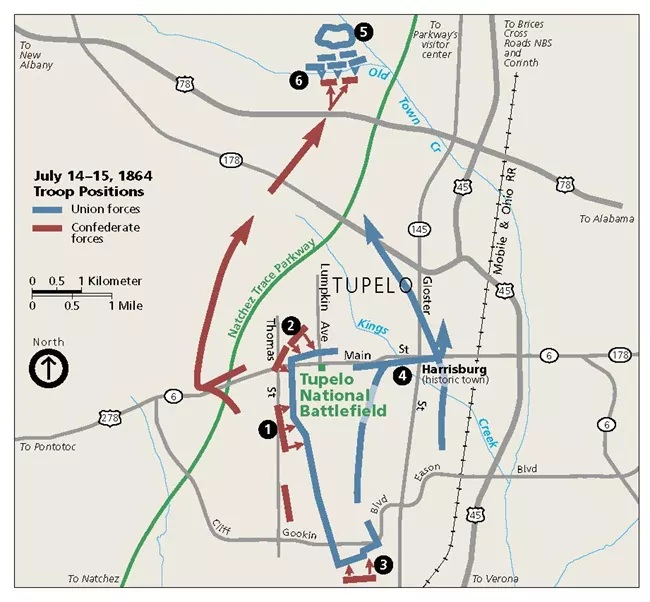
Battle of Tupelo, July 14-15 1864. (1) 7:30 AM, July 14. Crossland's brigade begins a series of uncoordinated Confederate charges against the Federal position, falling back after suffering severe losses. (2) A second Confederate attack led by Mabry and Bell's brigades is also repulsed without success. (3) Unsuccessful Confederate night attack. (4) Afternoon of July 15, Union troops move out from Harrisburg to make camp at Old Town Creek. (5) Confederates attack the Union position, but are defeated. (6) Confederates retreat towards Harrisburg.

General Forrest, who had scouted the Union position the night before, believed the Federals to be too strongly positioned, and urged General Lee to wait until they had broken camp and spread out along the road, at which point a successful strike could be made. Lee, however, was under pressure to end the encounter quickly so he could send reinforcements to Mobile, and chose to launch an assault on the morning of the 14th.

Lee assembled his troops by forming lines with Roddey's Brigade on the right, Mabry's Mississippi Brigade on the left, and Crossland's Kentucky Brigade in the middle. Bell's Brigade was put in the front line on Mabry's right. General Lee supervised the left and center, while Forrest was with the right. Both Chalmers' and Lyon's divisions were held in reserve. Opposing them was the Union 3rd Division led by Colonel Moore, supported by General Mower's 1st Division and a brigade of United States Colored Troops led by Colonel Bouton. According to Forrest: "The enemy had selected a strong position on a ridge fronting an open field, gradually sloping toward our approach. During the night he had constructed fortifications, and his position being naturally strong it was now almost impregnable." The space between the Union and Confederate lines was an open field extending from 200 yards to one mile from the Union fortifications, giving a strong advantage to Smith's defenders. Compounding the disadvantage, the Confederate attackers were heavily outnumbered by the Union army, with a force of about 6,500 Southerners facing off against 15,000 Federal troops.

The dismounted Confederates planned to advance on the Federal line and swing the Confederate right wing (led by Roddey and Forrest) around to flank the Union left. However, due to a misunderstanding or poor communications, the center of the Confederate line consisting of Crossland's Kentucky brigade of Buford's division advanced first while Roddey's brigade failed to move. Noticing that the Confederate right was not advancing, the Federal line focused their firepower on Crossland's troops, with the result that, according to Crossland: "The ranks were decimated; they were literally mowed down". Seeing Crossland's troops falling under heavy fire, Forrest chose not to send Roddey forward, and instead withdrew Roddey and Buford, confounding General Lee's original plan of attack.

Mabry's and Bell's brigades advanced on the Confederate left, but they were also repulsed with heavy losses. Four field officers of Mabry's brigade were killed and all of the regimental colonels of Bell's brigade were wounded. Union General Smith described the disorderly Confederate assault from his perspective: "the attack resembled a mob of huge magnitude, ...[it] seemed to be a foot race to see who should reach us first. They were allowed to approach, yelling and howling like Comanches, to within canister range, when the batteries of the First Division opened upon them. Their charge was evidently made with the intention to capture our batteries, and was gallantly made, but without order, organization, or skill. They would come forward and fall back, rally and forward again, with the like result. Their determination may be seen from the fact that their dead were found within thirty yards of our batteries."

On the left, Chalmers' Division received conflicting orders from both Forrest and Lee as to which point he should reinforce, and he chose to follow Forrest, sending Rucker's brigade forward before being ordered back by Lee. The remaining Confederate troops continued to attack, but the superior numbers and firepower of the Union troops easily repelled these piecemeal Confederate assaults, which were made more difficult by the extreme summer heat. The Union troops did not pursue the Confederates, who pulled back after 1 PM while Colonel McCulloch's brigade provided cover to form a new defensive line.

The Confederates prepared themselves for a follow-up Union assault, but none came. According to General Smith, "My troops were so exhausted with the heat, fatigue, and short rations that it was not possible to press them farther". At 11 PM, the Confederates attempted to flank the Union left in a nighttime attack, but they were quickly repulsed. The attacks of July 14th on the Union lines had been extremely costly, with the Confederates losing 1,310 killed, wounded, or missing out of the 3,500 total troops engaged, with the Union troops only suffering 674 casualties.

On the morning of the 15th, Smith's Union forces discovered that much of their food had spoiled, leaving them with only one day's rations. Wounded Union troops and Confederate prisoners were taken to Tupelo, and Smith's forces began to withdraw. Crossland's and Buford's forces led an attack on the Union left, but the main Union force was already in motion and formed a new battle line in the afternoon near Old Town Creek, north of Tupelo. Chalmers' and Buford's troops led by Forrest attacked the Union troops, but they were once again pushed back by superior numbers, and Forrest was wounded in the foot. The Union troops then continued to withdraw northward towards Memphis with only minor skirmishes along the way.

== Aftermath ==
"The action on the 14th was the most severe and destructive ever encountered by the troops of this brigade, who are veterans in the service. Their loss was unprecedented."

— Confederate Colonel Ed Crossland.

The Battle of Tupelo was uncharacteristic of most of Nathan Bedford Forrest's engagements, as it involved a frontal assault by dismounted troops over open ground, rather than Forrest's normal methods involving clever maneuvers and fast flanking movements. The overall strategy is usually attributed to General Lee, who took command at Tupelo and devised a flawed plan of attack: sending outnumbered attackers one brigade at a time against an entrenched defender. However, Forrest consented to Lee's plan prior to the battle, and Forrest can also be blamed for failing to send Roddey's brigade forward as planned, thus leaving the Confederate center exposed to withering fire from the Union lines.

Smith failed to press his advantage after the Confederate losses at Tupelo, leaving the Southern force battered but intact. After the war, General Lee reflected that a more skilled officer might have followed up the success at Tupelo with knockout blow to Forrest's corps, but Smith instead began to return northward on the 15th, having not achieved his objective of destroying Forrest's cavalry force. Sherman, who was closing in on Atlanta, was irritated that Smith had not delivered a finishing blow to Forrest, believing that the Southern cavalryman should not have been allowed to escape. While Forrest's cavalry took heavy casualties at Tupelo and lost many experienced officers, his Corps was still able to raid into Tennessee, attacking Memphis in August and joining Hood's Tennessee campaign in the fall.

== Battlefield preservation ==
The growth of modern Tupelo and the surrounding area has obscured many of the sites associated with the battle. The battlefield has been partially preserved and is home to the 1 acre (0.40 ha) Tupelo National Battlefield, established on February 21, 1929. The American Battlefield Trust and its partners have also acquired and preserved 12 acres (0.049 km^{2}) of the Tupelo battlefield as of mid-2023.

== See also ==
- List of American Civil War battles
- Troop engagements of the American Civil War, 1864
