= Organization of Forrest's Cavalry Corps =

List of Confederate military units

This is a list of military units that were part of Confederate General Nathan Bedford Forrest's Cavalry Corps during the American Civil War.

== 1863 ==
After serving as a brigade commander, in 1863 Forrest was assigned command of the Cavalry Corps in General Braxton Bragg's Army of Tennessee. Organization of Forrest's Cavalry Corps, September 19-20, 1863, at the time of the Battle of Chickamauga.

Division	Brigade	Regiments and Others
Armstrong's Division; BG Frank C. Armstrong	Armstrong's Brigade Col. James T. Wheeler	3rd Arkansas, Col. A. W. Hobson; 2nd Kentucky, Lt. Col. Thomas G. Woodward; 6th Tennessee, Lt. Col. James H. Lewis; 18th Tennessee Battalion, Maj. Charles McDonald
Armstrong's Division; BG Frank C. Armstrong	Forrest's Brigade Col. George G. Dibrell	4th Tennessee, Col. William S. McLemore; 8th Tennessee, Cpt. Hamilton McGinnis; 9th Tennessee, Col. Jacob B. Biffle; 10th Tennessee, Colonel Nicholas N. Cox; 11th Tennessee. Col. Daniel Wilson Holman; Shaw's, Hamilton's, and Allison's consolidated Tennessee battalions, Maj. Joseph Shaw; Huggins' Tennessee Battery, Cpt. A. L. Huggins; Morton's Tennessee Battery, Cpt. John W. Morton
Pegram's Division; BG John Pegram	Davidson's Brigade B.G. Henry Brevard Davidson	1st Georgia, Col. J. J. Morrison; 6th Georgia, Col. John R. Hart; 6th North Carolina, Col. George N. Folk; Rucker's (1st Tennessee) Legion, Col. E. W. Rucker; 12th Tennessee Battalion; Huwald's Tennessee Battery, Cpt. Gustave A. Huwald
Pegram's Division; BG John Pegram	Scott's Brigade; Col. John S. Scott	10th Confederate, Col. C. T. Goode; Detachment of BG John H. Morgan's command, Lt. Col. R. M. Martin; 1st Louisiana, Lt. Col. James O. Nixon; 2nd Tennessee, Col. H. M. Ashby; 5th Tennessee, Col. George W. McKenzie; N. T. N. Robinson's Louisiana Battery (one section), Lt. Winslow Robinson

After Chickamauga, most of these units were transferred to General Joseph Wheeler's command by order of General Braxton Bragg, which famously led to a heated confrontation between Forrest and Bragg. Forrest was left with only his escort company, Charles McDonald's 18th Tennessee Battalion, and John Morton's Tennessee Artillery under his command, and had to recruit an entirely new Cavalry Corps from his base at Okolona, Mississippi.

== 1864 ==
New units were recruited in West Tennessee and North Mississippi, along with consolidated units formed from other scattered cavalry companies that had suffered losses in 1863, adding to the strength of the Corps. A major reorganization took place on January 25, 1864, following Forrest's promotion to Major General, with 4 brigades divided into 2 divisions.

Division	Brigade	Regiments and Others
First Division; MG James Ronald Chalmers
First Division; MG James Ronald Chalmers	Second Brigade Col. Robert McCulloch	2nd Missouri, Lt. Col. Robert A. McCulloch.; Willis' Texas Battalion, Lt. Col. Leo Willis; 12th Kentucky Regiment, Col. W.W. Faulkner; Keizer's/Franklin's Tennessee Battalion; A.H. Chalmer's Mississippi Battalion; 2nd Arkansas, Cpt. F.M. Cochran
First Division; MG James Ronald Chalmers	Fourth Brigade; Col. Jeffrey E. Forrest	McDonald's Tennessee Battalion; 3rd Mississippi , Col. John McGuirk; 5th Mississippi, Lt. Col. Barksdale; Duff's (19th) Mississippi Battalion, Col. William L. Duff; 7th Tennessee Regiment, Col. William L. Duckworth
	First Brigade BG Robert V. Richardson	12th Tennessee, Lt. Col. John U. Green; 14th Tennessee, Col. J.J. Neely; 15th Tennessee, Col. Francis M. Stewart; 16th Tennessee, Col. Thomas H. Logwood; 17th Tennessee, Maj. Marshall; Street's Mississippi Battalion; Bennet's Tennessee (7th) Battalion
	Third Brigade; Col. Tyree H. Bell	22nd Tennessee, Col. Clark R. Barteau; 21st Tennessee Col. Andrew N. Wilson; 20th Tennessee, Col. Robert M. Russell; Greer's Tennessee Regiment

Later in 1864, additional commands from Mississippi temporarily joined the Corps:

Brigade	Regiments and Others
Mabry's Brigade (attached August 16, 1864 - March 3, 1865) Col. H.P. Mabry	14th Confederate, Col. Felix Dumonteil; 4th Mississippi, Col. C. C. Wilbourn; 6th Mississippi, Col. Isham Harrison; 38th Mississippi, Col. Preston Brent
Gholson's Independent Brigade, Mississippi State Troops (Attached May 1864 - February 1865); Col. John McGuirk	2nd Mississippi State Cavalry, Col. William L. Lowry; 3rd Mississippi, Lt.Col. H. H. Barksdale; Ham's Mississippi Battalion, Col. T. W. Ham; Ashcraft's Mississippi Battalion, Lt. Col. Thomas C. Ashcraft; Harris's Mississippi Battalion, Maj. Thomas W. Harris

In March 1864, General Abraham Buford was assigned to command the Corps' 2nd division, consisting of two brigades. By September, the organization of the Corps was as follows:

Division	Brigade	Regiments and Others
Chalmers's Division; BG James Ronald Chalmers	First Brigade Col. Edmund W. Rucker	7th Tennessee, Lt. Col. William F. Taylor; 12th Tennessee, Col. John U. Green; 14th Tennessee, Lt. Col. Raleigh R. White; 15th Tennessee, Col. Francis M. Stewart; 26th Tennessee Battalion, Lt. Col. David C. Kelley
Chalmers's Division; BG James Ronald Chalmers	Second Brigade Col. Robert McCulloch	7th Mississippi; 8th Mississippi; 18th Mississippi Battalion; 2nd Missouri; Willis' Texas Battalion; Hudson's Mississippi Battery (one section)
Bufords's Division; BG Abraham Buford	Lyon's Brigade BG Hylan B. Lyon	3rd Kentucky Mounted Infantry, Lt. Col. Gustavus A. C. Holt; 7th Kentucky Mounted Infantry, Col. Edward Crossland; 8th Kentucky Mounted Infantry, Lt. Col. Absalom R. Shacklett; 12th Kentucky, Col. W. W. Faulkner
Bufords's Division; BG Abraham Buford	Fourth Brigade; Col. Tyree H. Bell	2nd Tennessee, Col. Clark R. Barteau; 16th Tennessee, Col. Andrew N. Wilson; 18th Tennessee, Colonel John F. Newsom; 20th Tennessee, Col. Robert M. Russell
Bufords's Division; BG Abraham Buford	Artillery Battalion Capt. J.W. Morton	Four field-batteries: Morton's, Thrall's, Rice's, and Walton's, 16 guns.

== 1865 ==
Following costly defeats at the Battle of Tupelo and in the Franklin–Nashville campaign, Forrest retreated to Corinth, Mississippi in the final days of 1864. The final reorganization of the Cavalry Corps took place in February-March, 1865, following Forrest's promotion to Lieutenant General, when he was given command of all remaining Confederate cavalry forces in Alabama, Mississippi, & East Louisiana. New units were thus added to Forrest's command, but at this stage many of the cavalry brigades were only at regimental strength, having been decimated by battles in the previous year. Forrest's Cavalry Corps surrendered at Gainesville, Alabama on May 9, 1865.

Division	Brigade	Regiments and Others
Chalmers's Cavalry Division, BG James R. Chalmers	Armstrong's Brigade BG Frank C. Armstrong	1st Mississippi Cavalry Regiment, Col. R. A. Pinson; 2d Mississippi Cavalry Regiment, Col. E. Dillon; Ballentine's Mississippi Cavalry Regiment, Col. John G. Ballentine; Ashcraft's Mississippi Cavalry Regiment, Col. Thomas C. Ashcraft; detachment of the 12th Mississippi Cavalry Regiment; Company A, B, F, G, and I of the 5th Mississippi Cavalry Regiment
Chalmers's Cavalry Division, BG James R. Chalmers	Adams' Brigade BG Wirt Adams	Wood's Mississippi Cavalry Regiment, Col. R. C. Wood; 38th Mississippi Cavalry Regiment, Col. P. Brent; 9th Mississippi Cavalry Regiment, Col. H. H. Miller; McGuirk's Mississippi Cavalry Regiment, Col. John McGuirk; 14th Confederate Cavalry Regiment, Col. Dumonteil; Moorman's Mississippi Cavalry Battalion; 23d Mississippi Cavalry Battalion; Butler's Mississippi Cavalry Company; Ashby's Mississippi Cavalry Company; Withers' Mississippi Cavalry Company
Chalmers's Cavalry Division, BG James R. Chalmers	Starke's Brigade BG Peter B. Starke	4th Mississippi Cavalry Regiment, Col. Wilbourn; 6th Mississippi and 8th Confederate Cavalry Regiment, Col. William B. Wade; 8th and part of 7th Mississippi Cavalry Regiment, Col. T. W. White; 28th and part of the 7th Mississippi Cavalry Regiment, Maj. McBee; 18th Mississippi Cavalry Battalion and Companies C, D, E, H, and K of the 5th Mississippi Cavalry Regiment, Lt. Col. A. H. Chalmers
Chalmers's Cavalry Division, BG James R. Chalmers	Hudson Battery Lt. E.S. Walton	
Jackson's Division; BG William Hicks Jackson	1st Tennessee Brigade Col. Tyree H. Bell	2nd Tennessee; 12th Tennessee; 16th Tennessee; 18th Tennessee; 20th Tennessee
Jackson's Division; BG William Hicks Jackson	2nd Tennessee Brigade BG A.W. Campbell	7th Tennessee; 14th Tennessee; 15th Tennessee; 26th Tennessee Battalion
Jackson's Division; BG William Hicks Jackson	Texas Brigade BG Lawrence Sullivan Ross	3rd, 6th, and 9th Texas, Col. Griffith; 11th and 17th Arkansas (consolidated); Willis' Texas Battalion; Cobb's Texas Scouts
Jackson's Division; BG William Hicks Jackson	Morton's Battery Col. J.W. Morton	
Burford's Division; BG Abraham Buford	Consolidated Alabama Brigade consisting of the commands of BG Phillip Roddey; BG James H. Clanton & Col. Charles G. Armistead (each on detached service)	4th Alabama, Lt. Col. F. M. Windes; 5th Alabama, Lt. Col. James M. Warren; 6th Alabama, Col. Charles H. Colvin; 8th Alabama, Lt. Col. Henry J. Livingston; 10th Alabama, Col. Richard O. Pickett; 11th Alabama, Col. John R. B. Burtwell; 16th Confederate (12th Mississippi), Col. Charles G. Armistead; Stuart's Alabama Battalion, Maj. James H. Stuart; Clanton's Alabama Battery, Cpt. N. H. Clanton; Ferrell's Georgia Battery, Cpt. Coleman B. Ferrell; Merrin's Mississippi Battery, Cpt. F. W. Merrin; Various companies of Alabama Reserves
Burford's Division; BG Abraham Buford	Kentucky Brigade Col. Edward Crossland	Consolidated remnants of the 3rd, 7th, & 8th Kentucky
Unattached Brigade - BG Dan Adams	Alabama Reserves & Militia	
