= Battle of Tupelo order of battle: Confederate =

The following Confederate States Army units and commanders fought in the Battle of Tupelo, July 14-15, 1864, during the American Civil War. The Union order of battle is listed separately.

== Abbreviations used ==
=== Military rank ===
- Gen = General
- LTG = Lieutenant General
- MG = Major General
- BG = Brigadier General
- Col = Colonel
- Ltc = Lieutenant Colonel
- Maj = Major
- Cpt = Captain
- Lt = Lieutenant

=== Other ===
- w = wounded
- mw = mortally wounded
- k = killed
- c = captured

== Army of Tennessee (July 14-15, 1864) ==
LTG Stephen D. Lee, Commanding

=== Forrest's Cavalry Corps ===
MG Nathan Bedford Forrest (w)

Division	Brigade	Regiments and Others
Chalmers's Division; BG James Ronald Chalmers	Rucker's Brigade Col. Edmund W. Rucker (w)	7th Tennessee, Lt. Col. William F. Taylor; 8th Mississippi, Col. William Lewis Duff (w); 18th Mississippi Battalion, Lt. Col. Alexander H. Chalmers
Chalmers's Division; BG James Ronald Chalmers	McCulloch's Brigade Col. Robert McCulloch (w)	7th Mississippi, Lt. Col. Samuel M. Hyams; 5th Mississippi, Lt. Col. Nathaniel Wickliffe; McDonald's Battalion, Lt. Col. l J. M. Crews.; 2nd Missouri Col. Robert McCulloch (w); Willis' Texas Battalion, Cpt. Thomas M. Harwood.
Chalmers's Division; BG James Ronald Chalmers	Artillery	Thrall's (Arkansas) Battery, Cpt. James C. Thrall; Company C, 14th Battalion, Georgia Light Artillery, Cpt. Coleman B. Ferrell
Buford's Division; BG Abraham Buford	Lyon's Brigade Col. Edward Crossland (w)	3rd Kentucky Mounted Infantry, Lt. Col. Gustavus A. C. Holt; 7th Kentucky Mounted Infantry, Lt. Col. L. J. Sherrill (k); 8th Kentucky Mounted Infantry, Lt. Col. Absalom R. Shacklett; 12th Kentucky, Col. W. W. Faulkner (w)
Buford's Division; BG Abraham Buford	Bell's Brigade; Col. Tyree H. Bell	2nd Tennessee, Col. Clark R. Barteau (w); 16th Tennessee, Col. Andrew N. Wilson (w); 18th Tennessee, Col. John F. Newsom (w); 20th Tennessee, Col. Robert M. Russell (w)
Buford's Division; BG Abraham Buford	Mabry's Brigade; Col. H.P. Mabry	14th Confederate, Lt. Col. John B. Cage (mw); 4th Mississippi, Lt. Col. T. R. Stockdale (w); 6th Mississippi, Col. Isham Harrison (k); 38th Mississippi, Maj. R.C. McCay (k)
Buford's Division; BG Abraham Buford	Artillery	Morton's (Tennessee) Battery, Cpt. John Watson Morton; Rice's (Tennessee) Battery, Cpt. Thomas W. Rice
Roddey's Division; BG Phillip Roddey	Patterson's Brigade Col. Josiah Patterson	5th Alabama, Col. Josiah Patterson; Moreland's Alabama Battalion, Lt. Col. M. D. Moreland.
Roddey's Division; BG Phillip Roddey	Johnson's Brigade; Col. William A. Johnson	4th Alabama, Col. William A. Johnson; 53rd Alabama, Col. M. W. Hannon
Roddey's Division; BG Phillip Roddey	Artillery	Walton's (Mississippi) Battery, Pettus Flying Artillery, Lt. E. S. Walton
Lyon's Infantry Division; BG Hylan B. Lyon	Beltzhoover's Battalion Lt. Col. Daniel Beltzhoover	Various artillery troops converted to infantry
Lyon's Infantry Division; BG Hylan B. Lyon	Gholson's brigade BG Samuel J. Gholson	Dismounted Mississippi State Troops cavalry
Lyon's Infantry Division; BG Hylan B. Lyon	Neely's dismounted brigade Col. James J. Neely	12th Tennessee, Lt. Col. John U. Green; 14th Tennessee, Lt. Col. Raleigh R. White; 15th Tennessee, Col. Francis M. Stewart; Higgs' (Tennessee) Company, Cpt. W. Higgs

== See also ==
- List of orders of battle
