= 8th Mississippi Cavalry Regiment =

19th century confederate calvary battalion from Mississippi

8th Mississippi Cavalry Regiment 19th Mississippi Cavalry Battalion
- Active: 1863–1865
- Country: Confederate States
- Allegiance: Mississippi
- Branch: Confederate States Army; Forrest's Cavalry Corps
- Type: Cavalry
- Size: Battalion; Regiment
- Nickname: Duff's Battalion/Duff's Regiment
- Battles: American Civil War: Battle of Okolona; Battle of Fort Pillow; Battle of Brice's Cross Roads; Smith's Expedition to Tupelo; Wilson's Raid

The 8th Mississippi Cavalry Regiment, originally formed as the 19th Mississippi Cavalry Battalion and also known as Duff's Battalion or Duff's Regiment was a unit of the Confederate States Army in the American Civil War. As part of Forrest's Cavalry Corps, the 8th Mississippi Cavalry fought in numerous skirmishes and battles in Mississippi, Tennessee, and Florida before surrendering in May, 1865.

== History ==
Duff's Battalion was organized in North Mississippi in the fall of 1863 by Major William L. Duff, a veteran of the 17th Mississippi Infantry Regiment. After major Confederate defeats earlier that year, military strategy in Mississippi shifted to hit-and-run raids on Union supply lines intended to disrupt federal operations elsewhere. New troops were recruited in North Mississippi at this time, and numerous independent cavalry organizations were consolidated to form new cavalry regiments to aid in this effort. Duff's Battalion was assigned to McCulloch's Brigade, General James R. Chalmers' division, in Forrest's Cavalry Corps. The battalion's first action was a raid against the Memphis and Charleston Railroad at Moscow, Tennessee in December.

In February 1864, the battalion fought under Jeffrey E. Forrest at the Battle of Okolona, losing 8 killed and 9 wounded. The battalion also took part in the infamous Battle of Fort Pillow in April, where Black soldiers of the United States Colored Troops were summarily executed by the Confederates after surrendering.

At the Battle of Brice's Cross Roads in June, the battalion contributed to General Nathan Bedford Forrest's defeat of a larger Union force that had set out from Tennessee. The battalion suffered 9 dead and 47 wounded in this engagement. In July, 1864, the battalion was upgraded to regimental strength and renamed the 8th Mississippi Cavalry. During the federal expedition to Tupelo, Duff's battalion was attacked by Union cavalry on July 13, losing its battle flag and suffering 47 casualties. The following day the battalion fought at the Battle of Tupelo, where Colonel Duff was severely wounded.

In the fall of 1864 the regiment was sent to Mobile, Alabama and the vicinity of Pensacola, Florida, where they clashed with Federal troops at Milton, Florida in October, 1864.

In March 1865 the regiment was sent to North Alabama as Forrest gathered his remaining cavalry for a final defense of the state. In the final weeks of the war, the 8th Regiment was consolidated with the 6th Mississippi Cavalry, and Forrest's Cavalry Corps surrendered on May 3, 1865.

== Commanders ==
Commanders of the 8th Mississippi Cavalry Regiment/19th Mississippi Cavalry Battalion:

- Col. William L. Duff
- Lt. Col. William L. Walker
- Maj. Thomas A. Mitchell

== Organization ==
Companies of the 8th Mississippi Cavalry Regiment/19th Mississippi Cavalry Battalion:

- Company A, "Williams' Company"
- Company B, of Calhoun County.
- Company C, "Duff Guards"
- Company D
- Company E, of Lowndes County.
- Company F, of Lowndes County.
- Company G, of Lowndes County.
- Company H
- Company I
- Company K, of Clay, Chickasaw, and Calhoun Counties.

== See also ==
- List of Mississippi Civil War Confederate units
