= 1st Mississippi Partisan Rangers =

1st Mississippi Partisan Rangers/ 7th Mississippi Cavalry
- Active: 1862-1865
- Country: Confederate States of America
- Allegiance: Mississippi
- Branch: Confederate States Army; Forrest's Cavalry Corps
- Type: Partisan Rangers; Cavalry
- Size: Regiment
- Nickname: "Falkner's Regiment"
- Battles: American Civil War: Battle of Iuka; First Battle of Collierville; Second Battle of Collierville; Battle of Tupelo; Battle of Selma

Commanders
- Notable commanders: William Clark Falkner

The 1st Mississippi Partisan Rangers was a unit of the Confederate Army from Mississippi. The 1st Partisans operated as a cavalry regiment in North Mississippi and Tennessee, but suffered serious setbacks in late 1862 that compromised its effectiveness as a unit. Reorganized as the 7th Mississippi Cavalry Regiment in 1864, the regiment surrendered at the close of the war in May, 1865.

== Formation ==
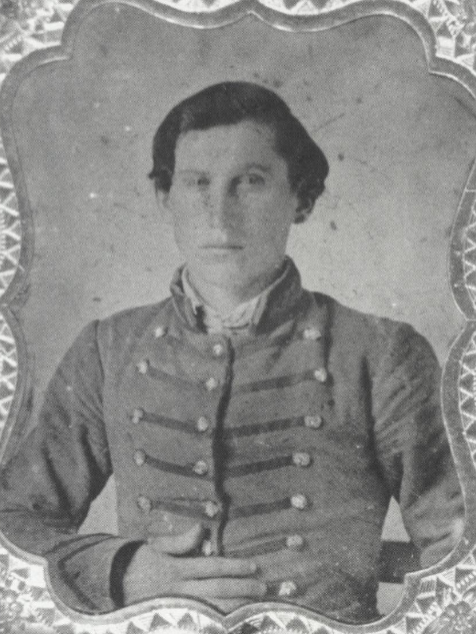
John Ross, 16 year old enlistee in the 1st Mississippi Partisan Rangers. Killed at Tupelo, 1864.

The 1st Mississippi Partisan Rangers were organized at Ripley, Mississippi in July 1862 under the authority of General Sterling Price. Federal cavalry raided the town of Ripley on July 28 in an attempt to capture the men, but the regiment was forewarned and escaped, mustering in to Confederate service at Orizaba on August 1. The unit reported a strength initial strength of 817 men and 35 officers. The Colonel of the Regiment was William Clark Falkner (great-grandfather of the novelist William Faulkner), who had previously served in the Mexican-American War, and had fought in Virginia as colonel of the 2nd Mississippi Infantry.

The Confederate Congress had passed the Partisan Ranger Act in April, 1862 to authorize the formation of irregular guerilla units, with the intention of sparking resistance to Federal authority in Union-controlled regions such as West Virginia. Partisan Ranger units were subject to the same regulations as regular Confederate Army troops, but in addition to their regular pay, they also received a bounty from the government for any captured Federal arms they turned over to army quartermasters. In contrast to resistance fighters in 20th century conflicts, Confederate Partisan Rangers wore military uniforms, were subject to the regular chain of command, and were enrolled as soldiers in the army. However, professional soldiers such as Robert E. Lee believed that Partisan Ranger units wasted manpower that could be directed to the more effective regular army. Excessive violence by partisan leaders such as William Quantrill and "Bloody" Bill Anderson damaged the reputation of these units and led the Confederacy to repeal the Partisan Ranger Act in February 1864. To prevent the flow of men eligible for conscription into partisan service, the army passed new regulations in the summer of 1862 prohibiting transfer from regular units to Partisan Ranger units, and required a minimum age of 35 to join partisan companies. Beginning in November 1862, the conscription authorities started drafting men from the 1st Mississippi Partisan Rangers into other Confederate units, despite protests from Colonel Falkner.

== 1862 ==
The Regiment's initial orders were to burn all the gathered cotton between the Tennessee and Mississippi Rivers to keep it from falling into Federal hands. The Regiment fought a skirmish with Union cavalry under Philip Sheridan near Rienzi, Mississippi on August 26, with a few men captured. During the Battle of Iuka on September 19, the 1st Partisans were posted as scouts south of the town of Iuka and clashed with the 2nd Iowa Cavalry, the Partisans suffered 5 killed and 10 wounded. The Partisans attacked the Mobile and Ohio Railroad on October 2 in an attempt to cut Union supply lines before the Second Battle of Corinth, but this attack was unsuccessful. Union troops under Col. Albert Lindley Lee raided the Partisans' camp near Ripley in a surprise attack before dawn on November 20, capturing 7 officers and 46 men of the regiment. Lee reported that Falkner's regiment was "now broken beyond any hope of reorganization," and this attack, along with the Confederate authorities' determination to forcibly conscript the Partisan Rangers into regular army service, caused the regiment to disintegrate.

== 1863–1864 ==
Falkner reassembled as many men as he could at Pontotoc in February, 1863, but the unit was never brought back up to its full strength. Many of the men had joined other units, either willingly or as conscripts. The regiment continued to operate in North Mississippi under the command of General James Ronald Chalmers, clashing with Federal cavalry. On April 18, 1863, a Union force raided the Regiment's camp near Hernando, inflicting 30 casualties and capturing 72 men. The Partisans took part in General Chalmers' raid on Collierville, Tennessee in October, 1863, and his second raid the following month.

Col. Falkner resigned his commission in late October 1863, he had largely been absent from command since the spring, with Lawson B. Hovis leading the Regiment after Falkner's resignation. The 1st Partisans fought in the battle along the Wolf River at Moscow, Tennessee on December 4, where Lt. Col. Hovis was badly wounded. He never recovered from his wounds and died in March, 1864.

Having lost their leadership and greatly reduced by desertion, in January 1864, the 1st Partisans were temporarily combined with 2 companies of the 18th Battalion, Mississippi Cavalry. Reassigned to Forrest's Cavalry Corps, with Lt. Col. Samuel M. Hyams as the commanding officer, the 1st Partisans spent the spring of 1864 rounding up deserters and conscripts in North Mississippi. The regiment fought a skirmish near Ripley on July 7 during Smith's Expedition to Tupelo, took part in the Battle of Tupelo on July 14, fought a skirmish at Oxford in August, and fought at Abbeville on August 23. On July 19, after the Partisan Ranger Act was repealed, the unit's name was officially changed to the 7th Mississippi Cavalry Regiment.

== 1865 ==
The 7th Cavalry was withdrawn to Mobile, Alabama in September 1864. In February 1865, John Goff Ballentine's Regiment, (also known as the 2nd Partisan Rangers), was consolidated with the 7th Cavalry. This combined unit fought at the Battle of Selma in April, and surrendered with Forrest's Corps afterwards in May.

== Commanders ==
Commanders of the 1st Mississippi Partisan Rangers:

- Col. William Clark Falkner, resigned October 1863.
- Lt. Col. Lawson B. Hovis, died of wounds, March 1864.
- Lt. Col. Samuel M. Hyams
- Lt. Col. James M. Park
- Lt. Col. H.C. Young

== See also ==
- List of Mississippi Civil War Confederate units
