= 2nd Missouri Cavalry Regiment (Confederate) =

19th Century Confederate military unit

- Active: 1861-1865
- Country: Confederate States of America
- Branch: Confederate States Army; Forrest's Cavalry Corps
- Type: Cavalry
- Size: Regiment
- Battles: American Civil War: Battle of Wilson's Creek; Battle of Pea Ridge; First Battle of Lexington; Battle of Iuka; Siege of Corinth; Battle of Booneville; Battle of Britton's Lane; Holly Springs Raid; Yazoo Pass Expedition; Second Battle of Collierville; Battle of Okolona; Battle of Fort Pillow; Battle of Tupelo; Second Battle of Memphis; Battle of Selma

Commanders
- Notable commanders: Robert "Black Bob" McCulloch

The 2nd Missouri Cavalry Regiment was a unit of the Confederate States Army from Missouri. Formed in 1861 as part of the Missouri State Guard, the 2nd Missouri Cavalry fought in its home state before transferring across the Mississippi River in 1862 to join Confederate forces in the western theater. Under Confederate cavalry generals Frank Armstrong, Earl Van Dorn, and Nathan Bedford Forrest, the 2nd Missouri fought in many battles in Mississippi, Tennessee and Alabama before surrendering in May 1865.

== History ==
The 2nd Missouri Cavalry was originally formed as a unit of the Missouri State Guard, organized in the fall of 1861 by Robert "Black Bob" McCulloch. Upon being mustered into Confederate service, the unit was enlarged and designated as the 4th Missouri Cavalry Battalion. In its home state, the 4th Missouri Battalion fought at Wilson's Creek, Pea Ridge, and Lexington. After these 1861 battles, the battalion moved across the Mississippi river and remained in the western theater for the remainder of the war. The battalion was upgraded to a regiment and redesignated as the 2nd Missouri Cavalry Regiment at Memphis in 1862.

The 2nd Missouri, under General Frank Armstrong, fought in Mississippi and Tennessee throughout 1862 at Iuka, the Siege of Corinth, Booneville, Courtland, Bolivar, Meddon, and Britton's Lane. In late 1862 the regiment was assigned to the command of General Earl Van Dorn, and fought in the Holly Springs Raid. The regiment then took part in the Yazoo Pass Expedition, Battle of Collierville, and a skirmish at Moscow, Tennessee. Most of these offensive cavalry operations in Mississippi and Tennessee were aimed at disrupting Union supply lines as Federal troops advanced through Mississippi.

In February 1863, the 2nd Missouri joined Forrest's Cavalry Corps and Colonel Robert "Black Bob" McCulloch was given command of a brigade. Leadership of the 2nd Missouri then passed to McCulloch's cousin who bore the same name, known as "Red Bob" to distinguish the two men. Under Forrest, the 2nd Missouri fought at Battle of Okolona, and played a major role in the assault at the Battle of Fort Pillow, where surrendering Black Union soldiers were summarily executed by Forrest's Cavalry. The regiment also took part in the July 1864 Battle of Tupelo, where Black Bob was wounded in the shoulder, and Memphis Raid of August 1864 where Red Bob was wounded.

In the fall of 1864 through February 1865, the 2nd Missouri was assigned to guard the defenses of Mobile, Alabama, but the regiment returned to Forrest's Corps when he was assigned command of all remaining Confederate Cavalry in Alabama & Mississippi. The regiment fought at the Battle of Selma during Wilson's Raid and then surrendered with Forrest's command at Gainesville, Alabama, on May 10, 1865.

== Commanders ==
Commanders of the 2nd Missouri Cavalry:

- Col. Robert "Black Bob" McCulloch, promoted to brigade commander, 1863.
- Lt. Col. Robert A. "Red Bob" McCulloch (cousin of "Black Bob")
- Lt. Col. Samuel M. Hyams

== See also ==
- List of Confederate units from Missouri in the American Civil War
