= 18th Mississippi Cavalry Battalion =

19th century confederate cavalry battalion from Mississippi

- Active: 1863–1865
- Country: Confederate States
- Allegiance: Mississippi
- Branch: Confederate States Army; Forrest's Cavalry Corps
- Type: Cavalry
- Size: Battalion
- Nickname: Chalmers' Battalion
- Battles: American Civil War: Grierson's Raid; Second Battle of Collierville; Battle of Fort Pillow; Battle of Brice's Crossroads; Battle of Tupelo; Wilson's Raid

The 18th Mississippi Cavalry Battalion initially known as Chalmers' Battalion was a unit of the Confederate States Army in the American Civil War. As part of Forrest's Cavalry Corps, the 18th Battalion fought in numerous skirmishes and battles in Mississippi, Tennessee, and Alabama before surrendering in May, 1865.

== History ==
Chalmers' Battalion was formed in 1863 to consolidate several existing independent partisan ranger companies operating in North Mississippi. The commanding officer was Major Alexander H. Chalmers, the brother of Confederate general James Ronald Chalmers. The battalion fought against Grierson's Raiders and guarded supply depots. Initially known as "Chalmers' Battalion", the designation was officially changed to the 18th Battalion Mississippi Partisan Rangers on September 10, 1863.

The Confederate Congress had passed the Partisan Ranger Act in April, 1862 to authorize the formation of irregular guerilla units, with the intention of sparking resistance to Federal authority in Union-controlled regions. Partisan Ranger units were subject to the same regulations as regular Confederate Army troops, but in addition to their regular pay, they also received a bounty from the government for any captured Federal arms they turned over to army quartermasters. To prevent the flow of men eligible for conscription into partisan service, the army passed new regulations in the summer of 1862 prohibiting transfer from regular units to Partisan Ranger units, and required a minimum age of 35 to join partisan companies. Attitudes towards the partisan rangers were negative amongst the military leadership, and the Confederacy repealed the Partisan Ranger Act in February 1864, converting these units into regular cavalry regiments.

The 18th Battalion fought against Federal cavalry raids in Mississippi during the fall of 1863, and joined Confederate troops under General James R. Chalmers at the Second Battle of Collierville in Tennessee. In January 1864 the battalion was assigned to Forrest's Cavalry Corps, as part of Colonel Robert McCullough's brigade in General Chalmers' division. Led by General Chalmers, the battalion took part in the Battle of Fort Pillow in April, 1864, where Black Union troops were infamously executed by the Confederates after they had surrendered.

Under General Forrest, the battalion fought at the Battle of Brice's Cross Roads in June, 1864 and the Battle of Tupelo in July. The battalion joined Forrest's raid on Memphis, and then afterward was sent in September to Mobile remaining in Alabama for the remainder of the war. Company C was detached and served as General Chalmers' escort company during the Franklin-Nashville Campaign.

In the final months of the war, the battalion was consolidated with part of the 5th Mississippi Cavalry Regiment and Captain B.F. Saunders' company of scouts to form the 18th Mississippi Cavalry Regiment. This combined unit surrendered with General Forrest's corps at Gainesville, Alabama in May, 1865.

== Commanders ==
Commanders of the 18th Mississippi Cavalry Battalion:

- Col. Alexander H. Chalmers
- Lt. Col. J. Waverly Smith
- Maj. William R. Mitchell

== Organization ==
Companies of the 18th Mississippi Cavalry Battalion:

- Company A
- Company B, Porter's Partisans
- Company C
- Company D, The Smith Rangers
- Company E
- Company F, Pettus Rangers of De Soto County.
- Company G
- Company H, Peach Creek Rangers of Senatobia
- Company I
- Company K, of De Soto County
- Yazoo County Company

== See also ==
- List of Mississippi Civil War Confederate units
