= Jeffrey E. Forrest =

Slave trader, Confederate-American military officer (~1837–1864)

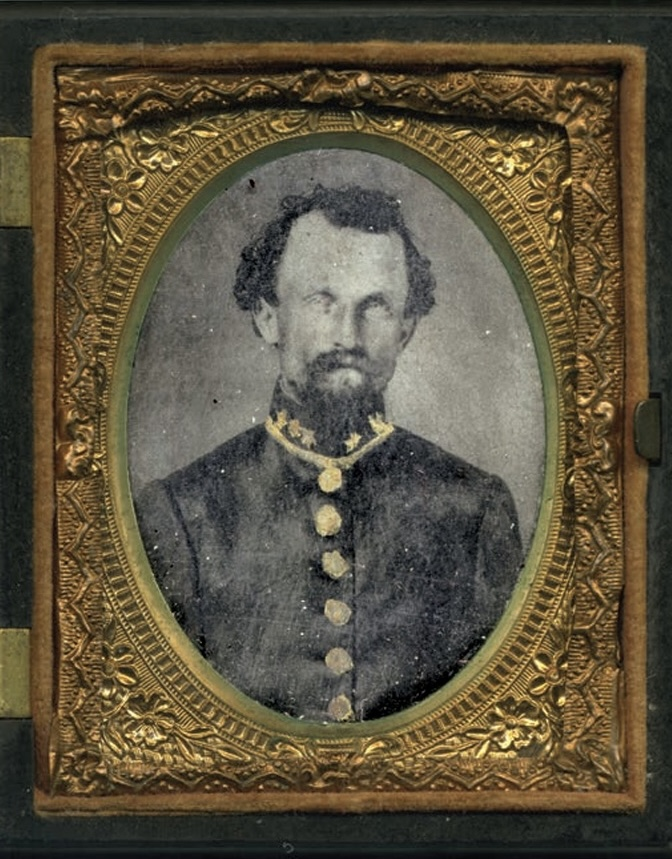
- Ninth-plate ambrotype, Matt Hagans Collection (Military Images, Spring 2018)
- Born: c. 1837; Tippah County, Mississippi, U.S.
- Died: February 22, 1864 (aged 26–27); Okolona, Chickasaw County, Mississippi
- Other name: Jeff Forrest
- Military career
- Allegiance: Confederate States
- Branch: Confederate States Army
- Service years: 1861–1864
- Rank: Colonel
- Units: 3rd Tennessee Cavalry; 13th Tennessee Cavalry
- Commands: 4th Alabama Cavalry Regiment
- Conflicts: American Civil War: Battle of Sacramento; Battle of Okolona †
- Other work: Slave trader

Jeffrey Edward Forrest (c. 1837 – February 22, 1864), commonly called Jeff Forrest, was a Confederate States Army military officer who was killed in action. He was the youngest of the six Forrest brothers who engaged in the interregional slave trade in the United States prior to the American Civil War.

== Biography ==
There are no known extant records of Forrest's birth, but he is believed to have been born in the family home in northwestern Tippah County, Mississippi (the area became part of newly established Benton County in 1870). His birth year is estimated from a combination of his listed age (22) on the 1860 census, and family lore regarding his father's death in early 1837. The index of applications for veterans' headstones has two entries for Forrest; one application, made by a grand-niece in 1966, lists his birth year as 1837 with a note "not shown," written in red pencil. J. E. Forrest was a posthumous baby, born four months after the death of his father William Forrest, a blacksmith. Nathan Bedford Forrest, 16 years older, served as a surrogate father to Jeff. Jeffrey was said to be Bedford's favorite brother.

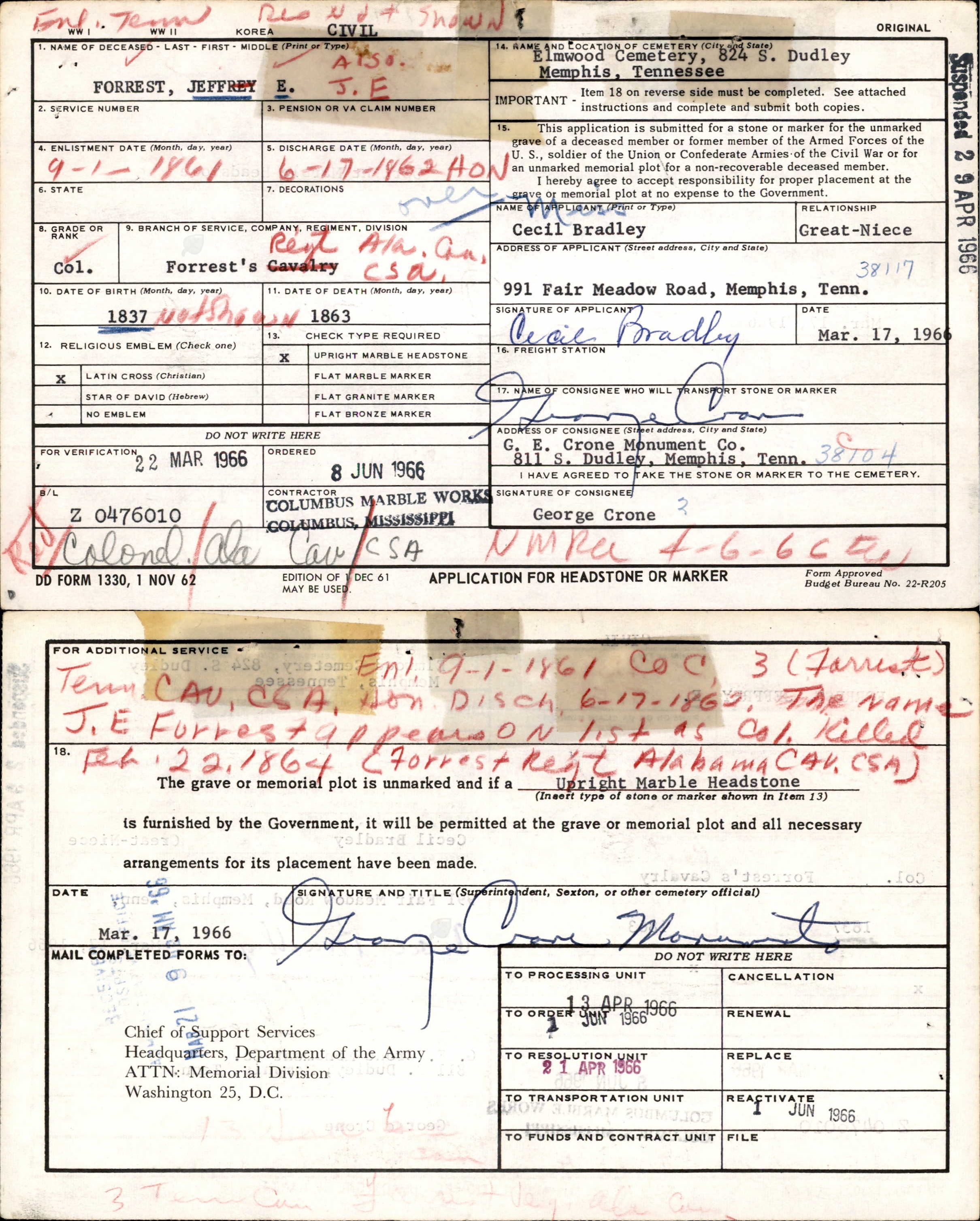
Application for a military veterans' headstone for J. E. Forrest, made by grand-niece Cecil Bradley in 1966

Forrest's brothers were "ideal junior partners" who contributed to a "building a formidable slave-trading operation." According to historian Frederic Bancroft, "By 1860, Forrest had demonstrated what success an...energetic man could achieve in a few years by buying and selling slaves instead of beasts and real estate. Since the decline of Bolton, Dickens & Co. he had become one of the best known and richest slave-traders in all the South. Except possibly the youngest, his five brothers—in sequence John, William, Aaron, Jesse, and Jeffrey—engaged in the same business with him." However, N. B. Forrest's most recent major biographer, Jack Hurst, found that J. E. Forrest's name does indeed appear in Mississippi slave-sale documentation: "...younger brothers such as Jesse and Jeffrey Forrest seem to have been engaged in these Mississippi operations, too, either selling slaves on their own or acting as agents for sellers in Memphis." Additionally, the returns of the 1860 U.S. census, which was not released until the year after Bancroft's book was published, show that J. E. Forrest was a resident of Vicksburg in 1860, and his occupation was listed as "negro trader," with personal property (including slaves) worth $15,000.

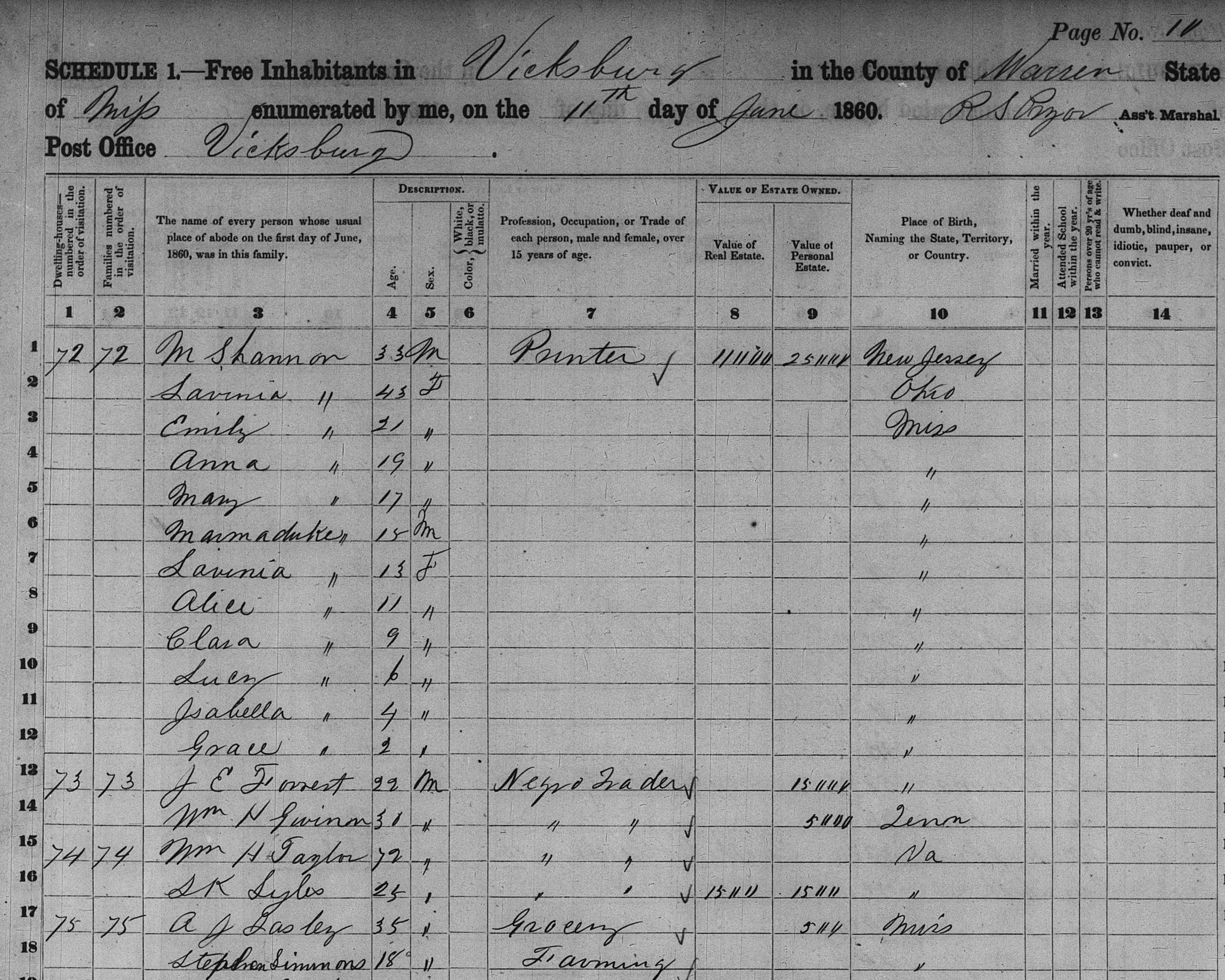
J. E. Forrest, "negro trader" of Vicksburg, Mississippi 1860

=== American Civil War ===
In June 1861, Nathan Bedford Forrest (age 40), his son William Montgomery Forrest (age 15), and his little brother Jeffrey E. Forrest (age 23–24), all enlisted as privates in the Confederate States Army.

A few months later, according to an 1899 account by an ex-Confederate named Dr. R. G. Lane of Texas, after the battle at Sacramento, Kentucky, on December 27, 1861, Jeff Forrest "started to shoot" an injured U.S. Army lieutenant that Lane had taken prisoner. Lane intervened to protect the lieutenant, "a game little fellow," stating, "I threw my gun down on [Forrest] and told him if he shot the prisoner I would kill him. He then rode off. It was said that he shot several men after they surrendered."

Jeff Forrest quickly rose though the ranks, earning promotions and becoming a captain in the 3rd Tennessee Cavalry, then a major in the 13th Tennessee Cavalry, and finally serving as a colonel of the 4th Alabama Cavalry Regiment (eventually designated 10th/11th Cavalry).

In November 1863 it was reported that Col. Jeffrey Forrest had been taken prisoner but released, and had been shot through both hips and was recovering at an officer's house near Tuscumbia, Alabama.

Forrest was killed in combat on February 22, 1864, at the Battle of Okolona, one of a series of fights in eastern Mississippi in the aftermath of W. T. Sherman's Meridian campaign, during which Nathan Bedford Forrest's outnumbered Confederate cavalry pushed Gen. William Sooy Smith's U.S. troops back out of Mississippi to Tennessee. The Civil War and Reconstruction Governors of Mississippi digital humanities project has a letter and a telegram sent by Col. J. E. Forrest about developing military conditions in the area just prior to the battle, requesting additional ammunition, reporting that their horses were tired out, and acknowledging the large numbers of approaching U.S. troops. The younger Forrest, commanding one of four brigades in a division headed by his brother, was leading a charge when he was "instantly killed by a Minié ball which passed through his neck, cutting the carotid artery and dividing the spinal cord."

According to an account published by the United States Army Center of Military History, Col. Forrest's death was a notable element of the engagements in Mississippi in February 1864:

About dusk, Union officers managed to rally their men along a ridge on the Ivey farm. The blue-clad troopers fought on foot behind a hastily improvised rail barricade. As the Confederates charged their position, the Federals poured volley after volley into the gray ranks, inflicting numerous casualties and mortally wounding the general's youngest brother, Col. Jeffrey E. Forrest. The elder Forrest rushed to his brother's side, and the young man died in his arms just moments later. Determined to avenge his brother's death, the enraged Forrest ordered a charge and led the way. Inspired by their leader's fearlessness, the Confederates crashed into the Union defensive line, and for a few tense moments, the fighting was hand to hand. Three Federal cavalry regiments then launched a mounted countercharge that halted the Southerners' progress. The Confederates began to give way as they ran out of ammunition, so Forrest ordered his command to break off the attack and rest for the night. The exhausted Federals resumed their retreat.

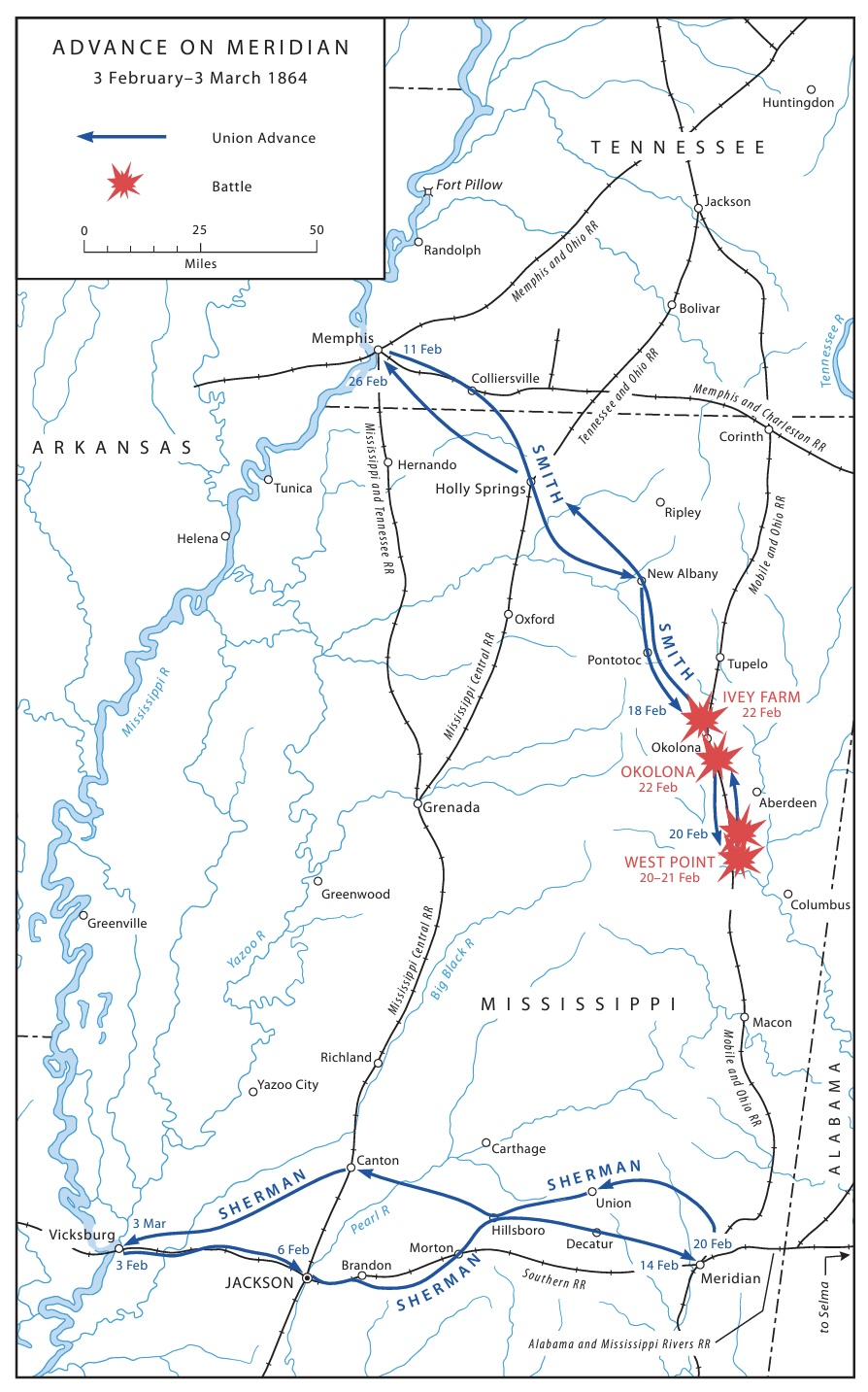
Battles of West Point, Okolona, and Ivey Farm in eastern Mississippi, February 1864 (CMH Pub 75-15 Map 1)

N. B. Forrest's report of the battle, as printed in the Official Records of the War of the Rebellion, stated "I regret the loss of some gallant officers. The loss of my brother, Colonel J. E. Forrest, is deeply felt by his brigade as well as myself and it is but just to say that for sobriety, ability, prudence, and bravery he had no superior of his age. Lieutenant-Colonel Barksdale was also a brave and gallant man, and his loss fell heavily on the regiment he commanded, as it was left now without a field officer." Another letter in the O.R. that mentions Forrest's death states "But great as was this victory, it is not without its allow. The laurel is closely entwined with the cypress, and the luster of a brilliant triumph is darkened by the blood with which it was purchased. It was here that Colonel Barksdale gave up his life a willing sacrifice upon the altar of his country. He fell in front of the battle, gallantly discharging his duty. He sleeps, but his name is imperishable. Here, too, fell the noble brother of the general commanding, Colonel Jeffrey E. Forrest. He was a brave and chivalrous spirit, ever foremost in the fight. He fell in the flower of his youth and usefulness, but his dying gaze was proudly turned upon the victorious field, which his own valor had aided in winning. Peace to the ashes of these gallant young heroes."

Jeffrey E. Forrest was buried in Odd Fellows Rest Cemetery in Aberdeen, Mississippi. He was reinterred at Elmwood Cemetery in Memphis, Tennessee in 1868.

== See also ==
- History of slavery in Mississippi
- Montgomery Little – American slave trader (1825–1863)
- Organization of Forrest's Cavalry Corps
- List of Tennessee Confederate Civil War units
- Tennessee in the American Civil War
- Mississippi in the American Civil War
