= Edmund Rucker =

Confederate Army officer (1835–1924)

Edmund Winchester Rucker
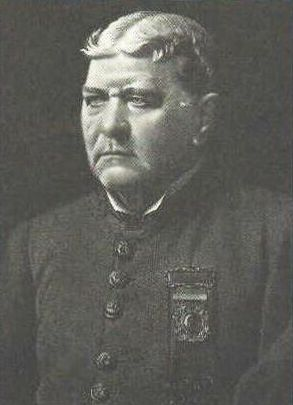
- Rucker in 1920
- Born: July 22, 1835; Murfreesboro, Tennessee, US
- Died: April 13, 1924 (aged 88); Birmingham, Alabama, US
- Burial place: Oak Hill Cemetery
- Spouse(s): Mary Adele Woodfin; Mary T. Bentley
- Military career
- Allegiance: Confederate States of America
- Branch: Confederate States Army
- Service years: 1861–1865
- Rank: Colonel (CSA); Brigadier General (unconfirmed)
- Units: Pickett's Company, Sappers & Miners; 1st Tennessee Heavy Artillery
- Commands: 16th Alabama Cavalry Btln.; Rucker's East Tennessee Legion; Rucker's Cavalry Brigade
- Conflicts: American Civil War: Battle of Island Number Ten; Pegram's Kentucky Raid; Battle of Chickamauga; Chattanooga campaign; Battle of Brice's Crossroads; Battle of Tupelo; Battle of Franklin (1864); Battle of Nashville
- Other work: surveyor, engineer, railroad president, business owner, banker

Signature
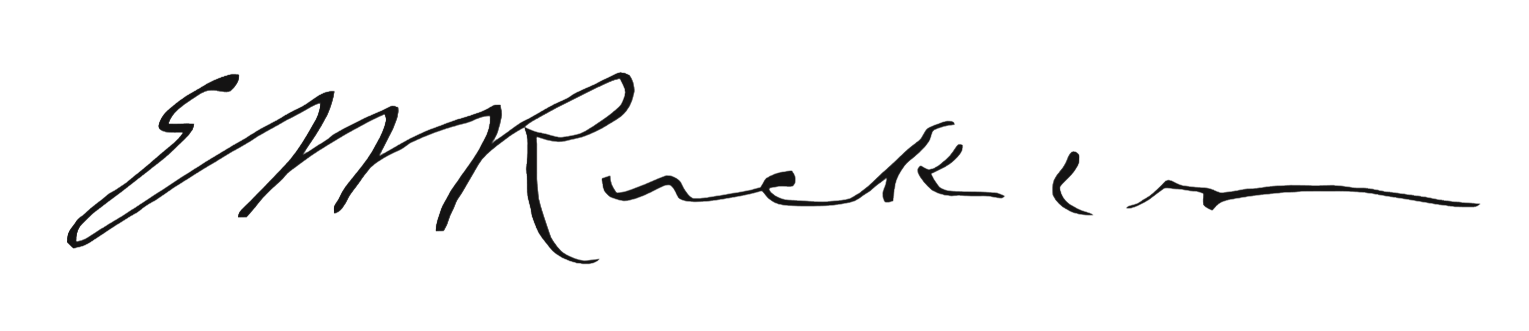

Edmund Winchester Rucker (July 22, 1835 – April 13, 1924) was a Confederate officer during the American Civil War. After the war he became an industrial leader of Birmingham, Alabama. Until 2023, Fort Rucker in Alabama was named in his honor.

== Early life ==
Edmund Rucker was born near Murfreesboro, Tennessee, on July 22, 1835. He was the grandson of Gen. James Winchester, a veteran of the Revolutionary War and the War of 1812. After a basic education Rucker moved to Nashville in 1853, working as railroad surveyor before becoming an engineer. He was the city engineer of Memphis during the late 1850s.

== Civil War service ==
When the Civil War broke out Rucker enlisted in the Confederate States Army as a private in Pickett's Tennessee Company of Sappers and Miners. Sent to Kentucky, he was promoted to lieutenant. On May 10, 1861, he was transferred and promoted to captain of Company C, 1st Tennessee Heavy Artillery; his unit composed primarily of men from Illinois. His company worked three 8-inch Columbiads and three 32-pounders as part of the garrison during the Battle of Island Number Ten. When the island fell he escaped and was commended for his valor. Rucker was transferred to the cavalry with the rank of major and assigned to enforce conscription laws in East Tennessee. His unit became the 16th Tennessee Cavalry Battalion. In early 1863 Rucker was promoted to colonel and given command of the newly created 1st East Tennessee Legion, also known as Rucker's Legion. Its components were his battalion as well as 12th Tennessee Cavalry Battalion and a battery of artillery. With his legion he participated in Pegram's Kentucky Raid, the Battle of Chickamauga and the Chattanooga campaign.

In February 1864 Rucker was assigned to Forrest's Cavalry Corps in Mississippi and given a brigade under General Abraham Buford, consisting of the 8th and 18th Mississippi and 7th Tennessee Cavalry Regiments. With those he fought in the battles of Brice's Crossroads and Tupelo, where he was wounded in the arm and leg. In November Rucker was appointed acting brigadier general, but his commission was never confirmed by the Confederate Congress. By then his brigade, now in the division of General James R. Chalmers, had seen massive change. It was made up with the 3rd, 7th, 12th, 14th and 15th Tennessee Cavalry Regiments, as well as the 5th Mississippi Cavalry and the 7th Alabama Cavalry. He participated in the battles of Franklin and Nashville and was wounded and captured in the latter. Rucker had his left arm amputated and was imprisoned at Johnson's Island in Ohio. General Nathan Bedford Forrest organized a prisoner exchange for him and Rucker was with the army again when it surrendered at Gainesville, Alabama, on May 9, 1865.

== Later life ==
After the war he returned to Memphis and the railroad business, working with Nathan Bedford Forrest. In 1869 he moved to Alabama as superintendent of a railroad. Rucker relocated to Birmingham, Alabama, in the early 1880s, building his home in the neighborhood now called Five Points. He worked with former General Joseph E. Johnston and became an industrial magnate, dealing with coal, steel, sales and land as well as being in the banking business.

The Episcopalian Rucker was married twice, first to Mary Adele Woodfin (1855–1883) in 1873, and after her death to Mary T. Bentley (1860–1941) in 1886. He had a son and three daughters with his first wife. He died on April 24, 1924, and was buried at Oak Hill Cemetery. Fort Rucker, Alabama was previously named in his honor. The United Daughters of the Confederacy named a chapter after him, the Gen. Edmond Winchester Rucker Chapter 2534.
