= Glasgow Railroad Bridge =

Historic steel bridge

Coordinates: 39.2227°N 92.8501°W

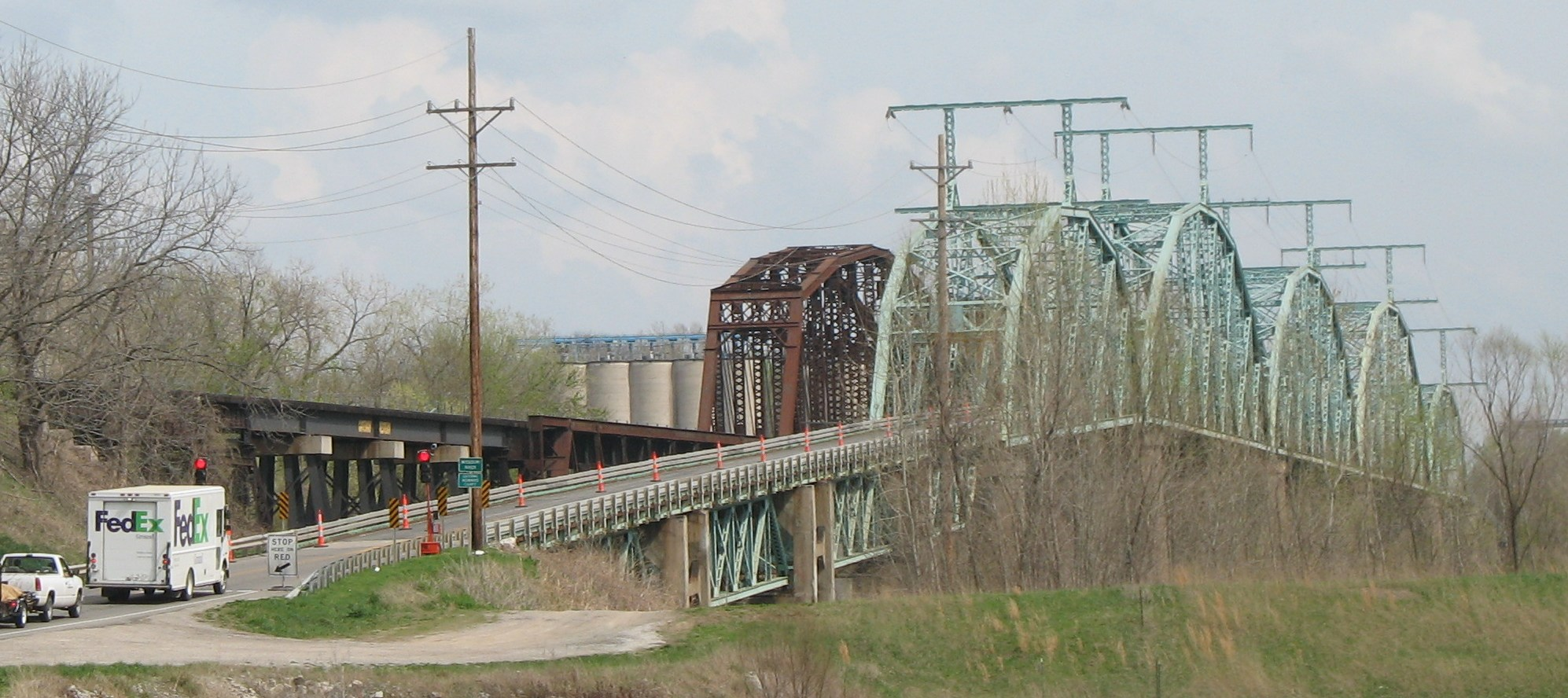
Glasgow Bridge from southwest along with rail bridge upstream from it. The automobile bridge was replaced in 2009.

The Glasgow Railroad Bridge is four-span through truss bridge over the Missouri River belonging to the Kansas City Southern railroad between Howard County, Missouri and Saline County, Missouri. Its predecessor is considered to be the first all-steel bridge made in the world.

It was originally built in 1878-79 by Gen. William Sooy Smith for the Chicago and Alton railroad as a five-span Whipple through truss and described as the world's first all-steel bridge. In 1900 it was rebuilt with Parker truss spans. Its previous owner was Gateway Western. It was damaged in the Great Flood of 1993.

== See also ==
- List of crossings of the Missouri River
