= 5th Mississippi Cavalry Regiment =

Cavalry regiment of the Confederate States Army

- Active: 1863–1865
- Country: Confederate States
- Allegiance: Mississippi
- Branch: Army
- Type: Cavalry
- Size: Regiment
- Part of: Armstrong's Brigade
- Facings: Yellow
- Battles: American Civil War: Second Battle of Collierville; Battle of Okolona; Battle of Fort Pillow; Battle of Franklin

Commanders
- Notable commanders: James Z. George

The 5th Mississippi Cavalry Regiment was a unit of the Confederate States Army formed in the late stages of the American Civil War. The 5th Mississippi Cavalry fought as part of Forrest's Cavalry Corps, taking part in numerous raids and skirmishes in Tennessee and North Mississippi. After being decimated by heavy losses, the 5th Mississippi was consolidated with other regiments a few months before the end of the war.

== History ==
James Z. George, a brigadier general in the Mississippi State Troops and well-known state politician, organized the 5th Cavalry Regiment in the fall of 1863 after becoming frustrated at mismanagement of the State Troops during the Vicksburg Campaign. George resigned his general's commission in the state forces, enlisted as a colonel in the regular Confederate Army, and began recruiting men for his new unit. The 5th Regiment had a reported strength of 350 troops in October, 1863, with many of the men drawn from State Troops cavalry units. At this stage of the war, much of Mississippi had been overrun by Union forces. Large numbers of Confederate troops had been captured after the fall of Vicksburg in July, and the state capital at Jackson had been evacuated and burned the same month. Confederate military operations in Mississippi from late 1863 onward mostly focused on cavalry raids that could disrupt Union-controlled railroads bringing reinforcements and supplies to Federal forces elsewhere in the state.

The Regiment took part in the Second Battle of Collierville, joining troops led by General James Ronald Chalmers. The raid on Collierville was an example of Confederate cavalry attacks against Union-held depots and garrisons that attempted to cut Federal supply lines. Col. George was captured during this battle and spent the rest of the war in a POW camp. In February, 1864, the 5th took part in the Battle of Okolona, where Confederate cavalry led by General Nathan Bedford Forrest defeated a Union force that was attempting to link up with General William T. Sherman's forces at Meridian. Commanding officer of the 5th Cavalry, James A. Barksdale, was mortally wounded in this battle.

In March and April 1864, the 5th Cavalry joined Forrest's raids into Kentucky and Tennessee, including the infamous Battle of Fort Pillow where Black Union troops were massacred after surrendering. Commanding officer of the 5th Cavalry, Lt. Col. Wiley M. Reed, was killed during a charge on Federal rifle pits at Fort Pillow. The regiment fought in several skirmishes and battles with Union forces in North Mississippi during the remainder of 1864. Forrest's cavalry then joined General John Bell Hood's forces in Tennessee, taking part in the Battle of Franklin on November 30.

After taking heavy losses, the 5th Regiment only had 32 men fit for service by March, 1865, and no serving field officers. The remaining men of the 5th Cavalry were consolidated with other Mississippi regiments, and these units surrendered at the close of the war in the spring of 1865.

The 5th Mississippi fought at the battle of Tupelo, Mississippi on July 14,1864 and July 15,1864. One of the confederate soldiers to fall was Pvt. W.H. Grist of the 5th Ms in a field on the original Brooks farm off of now Lakeshire lane on July 15, 1864 roughly less than a quarter mile from old town creek site, he was buried where he fell and reburied 142 years later with full military honors in Verona city cemetery in 2006.

== Commanding officers ==
Commanders of the 5th Mississippi Cavalry:

- Col. James Z. George, captured at Collierville.
- Lt. Col. James A. Barksdale, killed at Okolona.
- Lt. Col. Wiley M. Reed, killed at Fort Pillow.
- Lt. Col. Nathaniel Wickliffe, resigned August 1864.
- Lt. Col. P.H. Echols

== See also ==
- List of Mississippi Civil War Confederate units
