= Hinche Parham Mabry =

Confederate States Army officer

Hinche Parham Mabry, Jr.
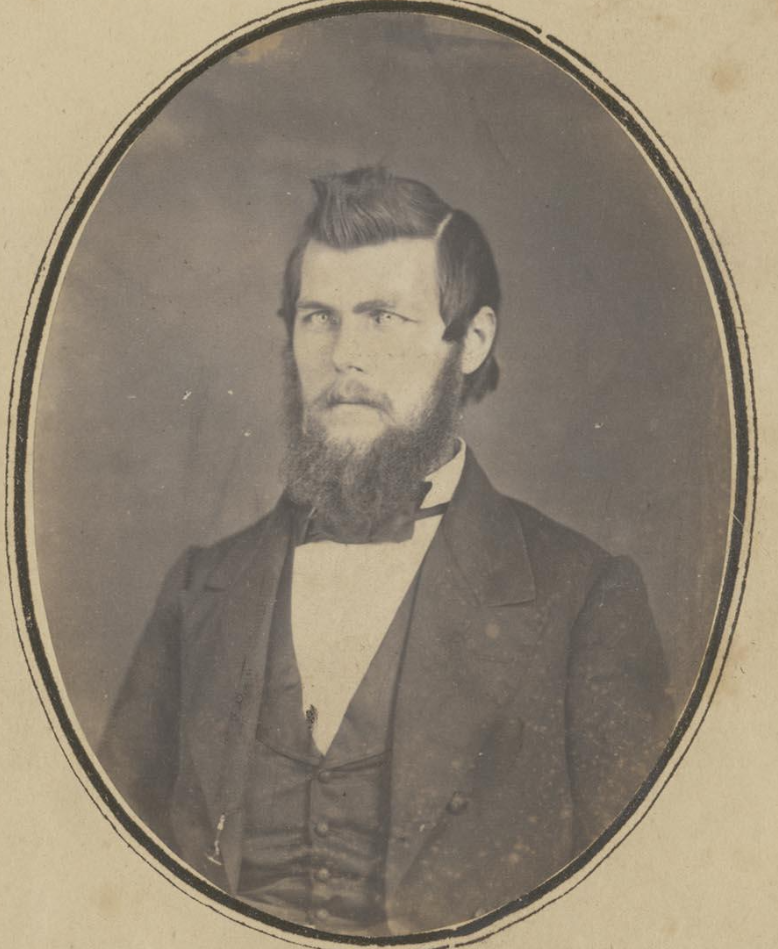
- Texas Legislature portrait of H.P. Mabry, 1860
- Born: October 27, 1829; Carroll County, Georgia
- Died: March 21, 1884 (aged 54); Sherman, Texas
- Burial place: Oakwood Cemetery, Jefferson, Texas
- Military career
- Allegiance: Confederate States
- Branch: Confederate States Army
- Service years: 1861–1865
- Rank: Colonel
- Nickname: "Hinchie" Mabry
- Commands: 3rd Texas Cavalry Regiment; Mabry's Brigade
- Conflicts: American Civil War; Battle of Wilson's Creek; Battle of Pea Ridge; Battle of Iuka; Meridian Campaign; Battle of Tupelo

Hinche Parham Mabry Jr., also known as "Hinchie" Mabry and H.P. Mabry (October 27, 1829 – March 21, 1884) was a Texas lawyer, state legislator, judge, and brigade commander in the Confederate States Army during the American Civil War. After joining the Confederate army, Mabry was promoted to colonel and assigned command of a cavalry brigade in Forrest's Cavalry Corps. Mabry's brigade fought against Union forces in Mississippi until the late stages of the war. During Reconstruction, Mabry returned to his home in Jefferson, Texas, where he was the leader of a KKK-style terror organization called the Knights of the Rising Sun. Mabry was implicated in lynchings committed by the group in 1868, but he was never prosecuted.

== Early life ==
H.P. Mabry Jr. was born in Carroll County, Georgia on October 27, 1829. He studied at the University of Tennessee and moved to Jefferson, Texas after university, where he studied law and was admitted to the Texas bar in 1856. Mabry was elected to the Texas State Legislature during the 6th session in 1855, and the 8th session in 1859, representing Cass and Titus counties.

== Civil War ==
At the outbreak of war, Mabry joined the Confederate army, and took part in an expedition to Indian Territory in May 1861 to capture Fort Washita and Fort Arbuckle, which had been abandoned by Union forces. Mabry became captain of Company G of the 3rd Texas Cavalry Regiment in June, 1861. The 3rd Cavalry fought at the Battle of Wilson's Creek in Missouri and the Battle of Pea Ridge in Arkansas. While on a scouting mission to Springfield, Missouri, Mabry and another Confederate captain were surrounded by a group of 7 Union soldiers and told to surrender. Fearing execution as a spy, Mabry and the other officer fought off the soldiers with bowie knives and revolvers, killing 7 and wounding others, and managed to escape.

Mabry was promoted to Colonel of the 3rd Texas Cavalry in July, 1862. At the Battle of Iuka, he was wounded and captured. Southerners captured at Iuka were paroled after capture if they would sign a statement that included the phrase: "so-called Confederate States," Mabry balked at this wording as an insult to the Confederacy and refused to sign. He was not released until 1863.

Mabry rejoined his regiment, and was assigned temporary command of Lawrence Sullivan Ross's cavalry brigade during the Meridian campaign, before receiving command of his own brigade in 1864. Mabry's brigade consisted of the 4th Mississippi Cavalry, the 6th Mississippi Cavalry, the 38th Mississippi Mounted Infantry, the 14th Confederate Regiment, the 14th and 16th consolidated Arkansas regiment, and an Arkansas artillery battery. General S.D. Lee commended Mabry's leadership, writing in 1864: "I cannot speak in too high terms of Colonel Mabry; he is one of the most gallant and best brigade commanders in the service."

Mabry's brigade joined General Nathan Bedford Forrest's cavalry corps and took part in numerous actions across Mississippi, capturing a Union gunboat, the USS Petrel, in April, and fighting at the Battle of Tupelo in July. Forrest's cavalry, including Mabry's brigade, took heavy casualties during this battle, of which Forrest wrote: "The battle of Harrisburg [Tupelo] will furnish the historian a bloody record, but it will also stamp with immortality the gallant dead and the living heroes it has made." In a March 1865 reorganization, Mabry's brigade was broken up and the units comprising it were reassigned. Forrest wrote that he "desire[d] to express his entire satisfaction with the manner in which Colonel Mabry has discharged the duties of his position while under his command." Mabry returned as commander of the 3rd Texas Cavalry under General Lawrence Sullivan Ross's brigade. Mabry surrendered at Shreveport, Louisiana on June 22, 1865.

H.P. Mabry's highest confirmed rank in the war was colonel, though he is often referred to as a general. Typically, the officer commanding a brigade as Mabry did would be promoted to brigadier general, but there is no record that Mabry ever received a general's commission. A contributor to Confederate Veteran magazine wrote in 1911, "There was not in the Confederate army, perhaps, a man who commanded a brigade as long as Colonel Mabry without promotion."

== Reconstruction ==
After the war, Mabry returned to his home of Jefferson, Texas, where he joined the 1866 Texas constitutional convention and was elected to a judgeship, but he was removed from office during Reconstruction for his Confederate ties. During this period, East Texas was a major center of opposition to Reconstruction, and there were numerous outbreaks of racial violence against the newly emancipated Black population. Mabry became a leader of the Knights of the Rising Sun, a local white supremacist terror organization similar to the Ku Klux Klan.

In October 1868, former Union officer from New York and prominent Republican, George Washington Smith was involved in a shoot-out with locals who had tried to ambush him after a Republican meeting in Jefferson. Smith, along with four Black men involved in the local Republican party, were arrested for assault, and Smith was lynched by a mob led by the Knights of the Rising Sun, who overpowered the guards and broke into the local jail. Two of the Black men arrested with Smith, Lewis Grant and Richard Stewart, were also killed, and two others escaped after being wounded. The Knights then rampaged through Jefferson and the outlying areas, terrorizing the local Black community. After suspects were brought to trial for the murders, one of the defendants implicated Mabry, who was acting as a defense attorney in the trial. A grand jury indicted Mabry for murder, he then fled to Canada to avoid prosecution. Mabry later returned to Texas and was never prosecuted for the murders. Like many other perpetrators of racial violence in the Reconstruction era, Mabry suffered no consequences for his actions, and his 1884 obituary only remembered him as a "distinguished soldier, citizen, and jurist."

== Personal life and death ==
H.P. Mabry married Sarah Abigail Haywood in 1854, and the couple had 3 children, including Woodford H. Mabry, who became adjutant general of Texas and a prominent leader of the Texas Rangers. Camp Mabry near Austin is named after Woodford Mabry. After the Civil War, H.P. Mabry and his wife opened a hotel in Jefferson, Texas, known as the Haywood House, and the historic structure has been preserved and renovated.

In 1879 Mabry moved to Fort Worth, Texas, and died of sepsis on March 21, 1884, after being wounded in the foot by an accidental firearm discharge. Mabry was buried in Oakwood Cemetery in Jefferson.

Formerly, there was a historical marker in Fort Worth dedicated to Mabry. The marker glorified his wartime service, making no mention of his involvement with white supremacist organizations or the post-war lynchings. This marker was removed in 2017 and given to the Texas Civil War Museum.
