= 4th Mississippi Cavalry Regiment =

Cavalry regiment of the Confederate States Army

- Country: Confederate States
- Allegiance: Mississippi
- Branch: Army; Forrest's Cavalry Corps
- Type: Cavalry
- Size: Regiment
- Battles: American Civil War; Grierson's Raid; Siege of Port Hudson; Jackson expedition; Meridian Campaign; Battle of Tupelo

The 4th Mississippi Cavalry Regiment was a cavalry unit of the Confederate States Army in the Western Theater of the American Civil War. The 4th Regiment was formed by combining various cavalry companies into one consolidated regiment in the autumn of 1862. The 4th Cavalry fought in numerous battles in Mississippi and Louisiana before surrendering at the close of the war in May 1865.

== Composition ==
Several small, independent Mississippi cavalry companies were combined in late 1862 to form the 4th Regiment under the overall command of Colonel C.C. Wilbourn. After they were combined, the separate companies of the 4th Regiment often operated as independent units while on assignment to different parts of the state to oppose raids by Federal troops.

The Copiah Horse Guards also known as Norman's Company of Partisan Rangers was mustered into service at Hazelhurst on March 1, 1861. This company served in Tennessee during the summer of 1861, and was then sent to the Gulf Coast in February 1862. This unit became Company B of the 4th Regiment and was commanded by Captains T.A. Graves and James M. Norman.

Hughes' Battalion of Partisan Rangers was organized in the summer of 1862 by Col. Henry Hughes, with Lt. Col. C.C. Wilbourn commanding. Wilbourn later became Colonel of the 4th Regiment.

Magruder's Partisans, organized at Port Gibson, Mississippi on June 14, 1862, with Captain J.M. Magruder commanding. This became Company C of the 4th Regiment. Captain Magruder was killed in skirmish near Canton, Mississippi on February 29, 1864.

Stockdale's Battalion of Partisan Rangers was organized at Holmesville, Mississippi on July 1, 1862, commanded by Thomas R. Stockdale, this unit later became Company I of the 4th Regiment, and Stockdale was promoted to Lieutenant Colonel.

McLaurin's Company of Partisan Rangers, also called the Mississippi Scouts, was led by Captain Cornelius McLaurin. This company was first assembled in 1861 and went north to Kentucky with the Army of 10,000 during the winter of 1861–1862. McLaurin's Company became Company F of the 4th Regiment.

Terrell's Dragoons, organized in the summer of 1862, was led by Captain Vernon L. Terrell. In November 1862, Terrell's company captured a Federal steamboat, the Lone Star, near Plaquemine, Louisiana.

== History ==
After consolidation as the 4th Mississippi, the Regiment took part in actions in Mississippi and Louisiana opposing Grierson's Raid in April 1863. Near Baton Rouge, Louisiana, the Regiment's camp was hit by an unexpected early morning attack by Grierson's troops, with several men taken prisoner. The 4th Cavalry took part in raids and skirmishes against the Federal rear during the Siege of Port Hudson, May - July 1863, including the Battle of Plains Store. Terrell's Dragoons skirmished with Federal troops near Ellisville, Mississippi in June 1863.

The 4th Regiment was assigned to Wirt Adams' Brigade in January 1864 and fought several skirmishes during the Meridian campaign. As part of H.P. Mabry's Brigade under Major General Nathan Bedford Forrest, the Regiment fought in several more skirmishes opposing Federal raids in Mississippi, as well as the Battle of Tupelo in July 1864, where acting commander of the Regiment Lt. Col. T.R. Stockdale was wounded. In February 1865 the Regiment was assigned to Starke's Brigade. Under the command of General Forrest, the Regiment surrendered at Gainesville, Alabama on May 9, 1865.

In the Official Records of the Union and Confederate Armies, the 2nd Mississippi Cavalry Regiment is often referred to as the "4th Mississippi Cavalry". However this was a different regiment than the 4th Cavalry commanded by Col. C.C. Wilbourn.

== Notable members ==
- George W. Cable, novelist, enlisted in the 4th Cavalry in 1863, and was wounded in action.

== Commanding officers ==
Commanders of the 4th Mississippi Cavalry:

- Col. C.C. Wilbourn
- Lt. Col. Cornelius McLaurin
- Lt. Col. Thomas R. Stockdale
- Maj. James R. Norman
- Capt. Jefferson J. Whitney

== Organization ==
Companies of the 4th Mississippi Cavalry:

- Company A, of Crystal Springs.
- Company B "Copiah Horse Guards", of Copiah County.
- Company C "Magruder Partisans", of Port Gibson.
- Company D
- Company E
- Company F, "Mississippi Scouts", of Rankin County.
- Company H, of Jefferson County.
- Company I "Stockdale Rangers", of Wilkinson, Amite, Pike and Franklin Counties.
- Company K
- Terrell's Dragoons

== See also ==
- List of Mississippi Civil War Confederate units
