= William Sooy Smith =

Brigadier general in the Union Army

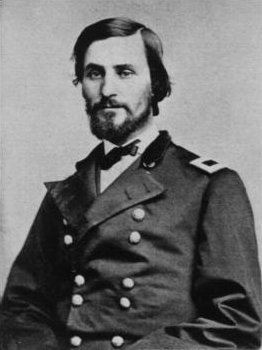
- Born: July 22, 1830; Tarlton, Ohio, US
- Died: March 4, 1916 (aged 85); Medford, Oregon, US
- Burial place: Forest Home Cemetery; Forest Park, Illinois
- Military career
- Allegiance: United States; Union
- Branch: United States Army; Union Army
- Service years: 1853–1854; 1861–1864
- Rank: Brigadier General
- Nickname: "Sookey"
- Commands: 13th Ohio Infantry Regiment; 1st Division / XVI Corps; Cavalry / Mil. Div. of the Mississippi
- Conflicts: American Civil War: Battle of Shiloh; Battle of Perryville; Vicksburg Campaign; Battle of Okolona

Signature
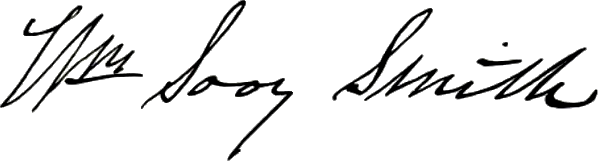

William Sooy Smith (July 22, 1830 – March 4, 1916) was a West Point graduate and career civil engineer who became a brigadier general in the Union Army during the American Civil War.

In civilian life, he was a renowned engineer involved in bridge construction that included the building of the first large all steel bridge in the world.

== Early life and career ==
Smith was born in Tarlton, Ohio, and graduated from Ohio University in 1849 with an engineering degree. He furthered this degree at West Point as soon as he left the university, graduating sixth in his class from the U.S. Military Academy in 1853. Smith resigned from the Army on June 19, 1854 to accept a position with the Illinois Central Railroad.

Smith established the engineering company Parkinson & Smith in 1857, and was involved in the first surveys for a bridge between the United States and Canada across the Niagara River near Niagara Falls.

== Civil War ==
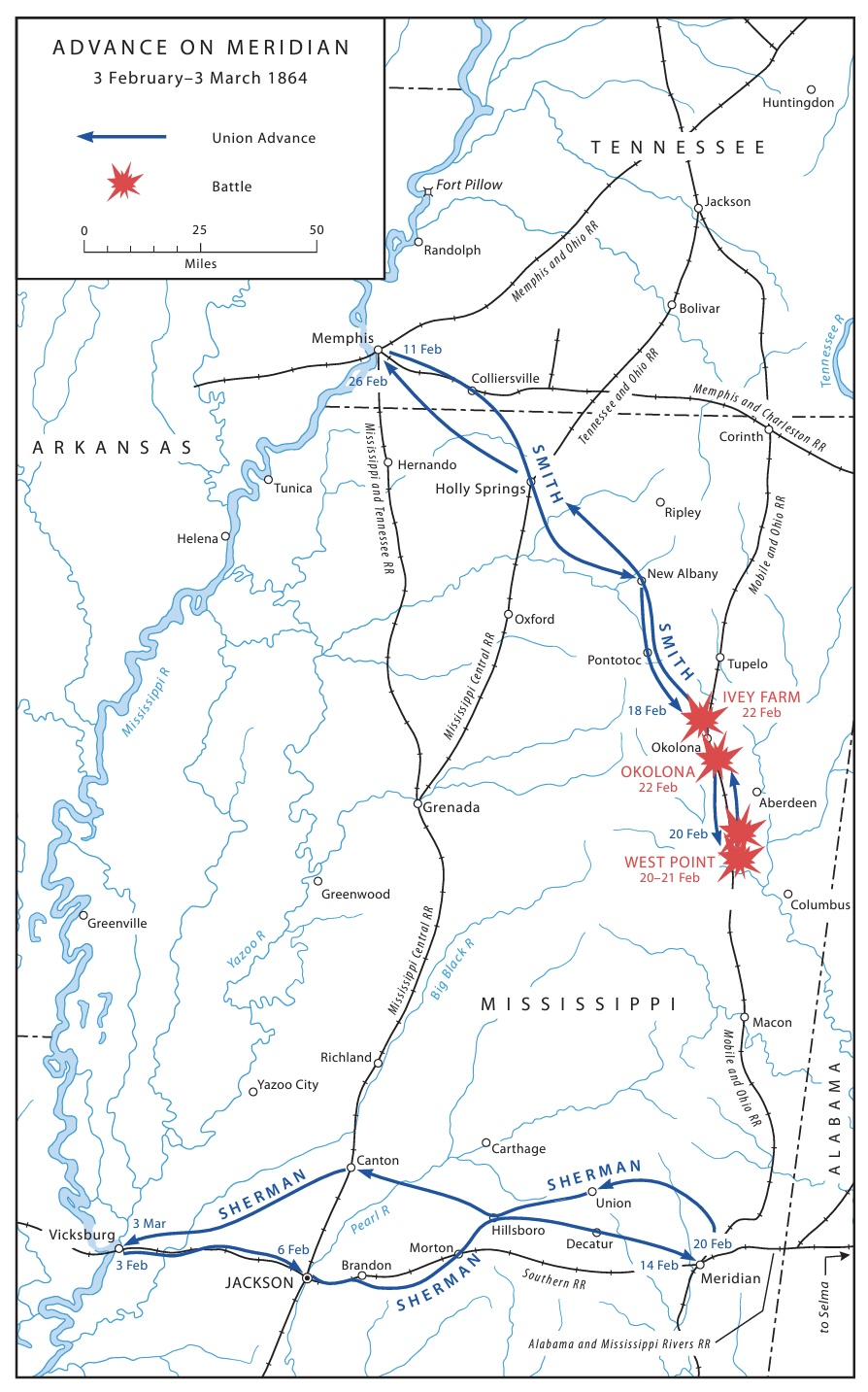
Battles of West Point, Okolona, and Ivey Farm in eastern Mississippi, February 1864 (CMH Pub 75-15 Map 1)

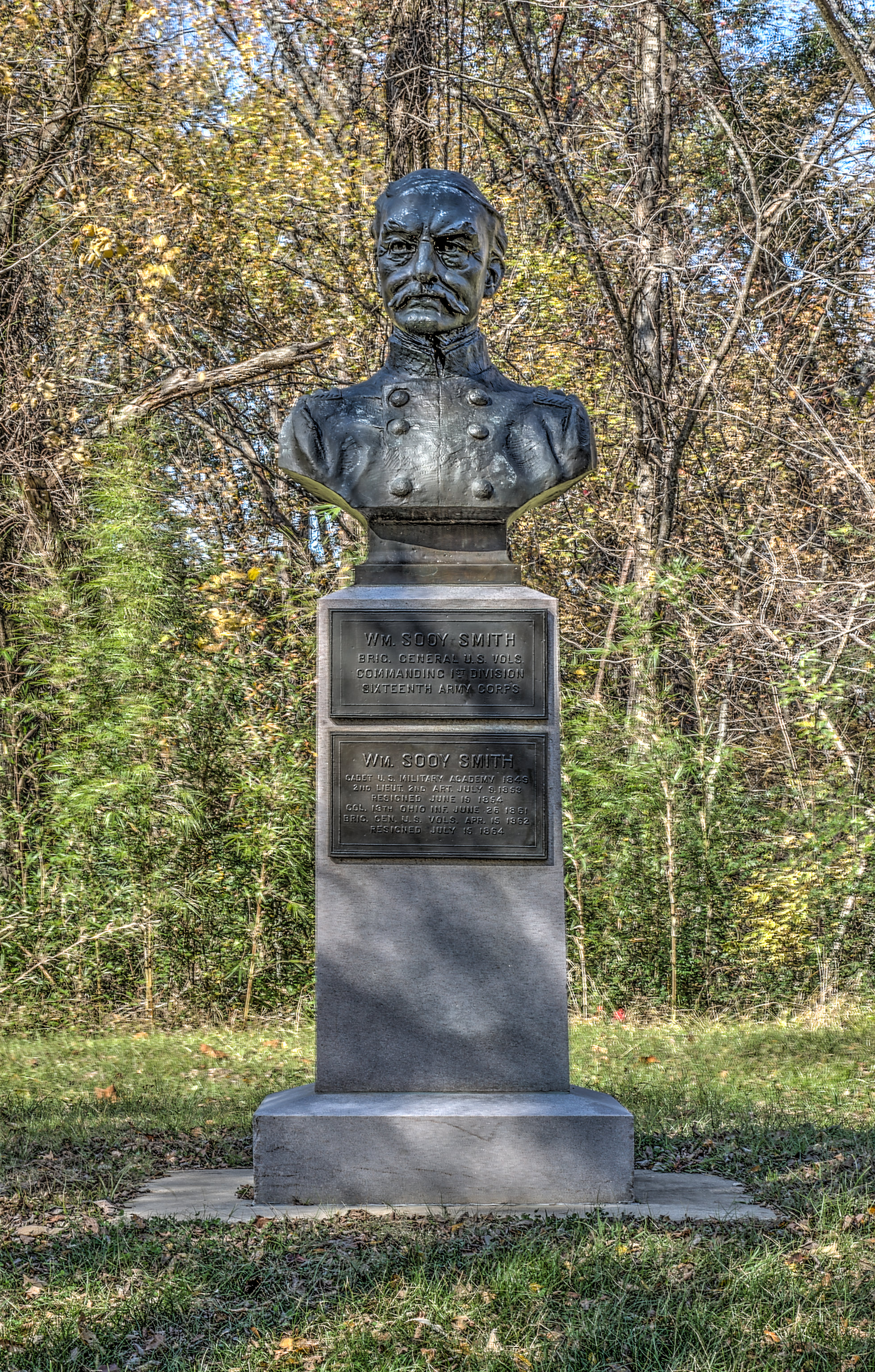
Bust of Smith by Solon Borglum at Vicksburg National Military Park

In 1861 at the outbreak of the Civil War, Smith joined the 13th Ohio Infantry, and by June he was commissioned as its colonel. After serving in western Virginia, he was appointed brigadier general (volunteers) on April 16, 1862 to rank from April 15, 1862. Smith participated in the Vicksburg campaign, commanding the XVI Corps' first division.

On January 27, 1864, as part of the Meridian Campaign, Smith was given the command of General Hurlbut's force of 7,000 cavalry, to be consolidated from their positions throughout western Kentucky and Tennessee, along with the 2,500 that was already under his command. However, Smith delayed his advance waiting on one of the units, Waring's brigade, which was ice bound near Columbus, Kentucky. He did not start his advance until February 11, ten days later than planned. Smith's force did not join up with Sherman at Meridian as forces under Maj. Gen. Nathan Bedford Forrest defeated him on February 22, 1864 in the Battle of Okolona. Smith was forced to fight an eleven-mile running battle before retreating across the state line into Tennessee on February 26. Consequently, he was criticized for putting Sherman's Meridian Expedition in danger.

Afterwards, he served as chief of cavalry in both the Department of Tennessee and the Military Division of the Mississippi, under Ulysses S. Grant and William T. Sherman. He resigned from the Army in July 1864 due to rheumatoid arthritis.

== Postbellum career ==
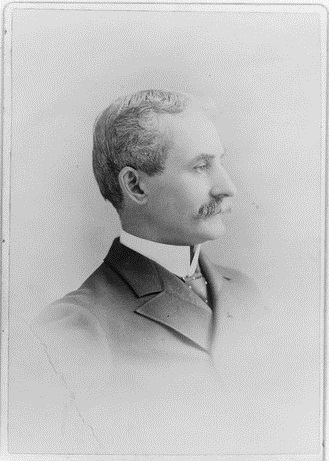
Smith in later life

After leaving the army Smith returned to civil engineering. In 1867, he sank the first pneumatic caisson of the Waugoshanee lighthouse in the Straits of Mackinaw. At Glasgow, Missouri, from 1878 to 1879, Smith worked on the Glasgow Railroad Bridge. This was the first all-steel bridge, which crossed the Missouri River.

In 1876 Smith was awarded the American Centennial Exposition prize, and continued to work in engineering until retirement to Medford, Oregon towards the end of his life. After his death in 1916, he was buried in Forest Home Cemetery in Forest Park, Illinois.

== See also ==
- List of American Civil War generals (Union)
