= Tyree H. Bell =

Confederate general (1815–1902)

Tyree Harris Bell
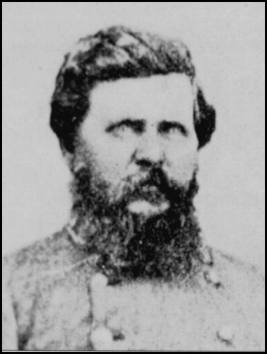
- Brig. Gen. Tyree H. Bell
- Born: September 5, 1815; Covington, Kentucky, US
- Died: August 30, 1902 (aged 86); New Orleans, Louisiana, US
- Burial place: Bethel Cemetery, Sanger, California
- Military career
- Allegiance: Confederate States of America
- Branch: Confederate States Army
- Service years: 1861–1865
- Rank: Brigadier General
- Units: 12th Tennessee Infantry Regiment; 3rd Bde, Forrest's Cavalry Corps; Bell's Cavalry Brigade
- Conflicts: American Civil War
- Other work: Farmer

Tyree Harris Bell (September 5, 1815 – August 30, 1902) was a senior officer of the Confederate States Army during the American Civil War.

As lieutenant colonel Bell commanded the 12th Tennessee Volunteer Infantry Regiment and was severely wounded at the Battle of Shiloh. He led his regiment in the invasion of Kentucky and the Battle of Richmond.

Later Bell commanded a cavalry regiment and then a brigade under Major General Nathan Bedford Forrest. As one of Forrest's trusted lieutenants, he fought in several raids and battles during the last two years of the war. Bell's force successfully covered the Army of Tennessee's retreat after the Battle of Nashville, but Bell was again seriously wounded and lost his right eye.

After receiving consistent praise from his superior officers Bell was promoted to brigadier general on February 28, 1865. At the end of the war he participated in the Battle of Selma and ultimately surrendered with Forrest's command. Ten years after the Civil War, Bell moved from Tennessee to Fresno County, California, and became a successful farmer.

== Early life ==
Tyree H. Bell was born on September 5, 1815, in Covington, Kentucky, the son of Absalom B. Bell and Susannah Harris. He grew up on his father's small plantation at Gallatin, Tennessee. He was educated in rural schools. Bell became a planter on his own plantation in Sumner County, Tennessee. Bell married Mary Ann Walton on December 2, 1841. Tyree and Mary Ann Bell had nine children.

== American Civil War ==
When the American Civil War started, Bell raised a company of infantry, the "Newbern Blues" which became Company G (later A) for the 12th Tennessee Infantry Regiment of the Confederate States Army. He was elected its captain, June 4, 1861. The regiment moved to Columbus, Kentucky in September 1861 and spending the summer in Jackson, Tennessee and Union City, Tennessee.

Bell soon became lieutenant colonel of the 12th Tennessee Infantry Regiment and commanded it at the Battle of Belmont because Colonel Robert Milton Russell was in command of a brigade. With Russell again in command of a brigade, Bell led the regiment the Battle of Shiloh, where he was wounded in the leg by the fall of his horse, one of two shot from under him during the battle, and also suffered a serious bullet wound.

After only six weeks of recovery after being wounded at Shiloh, Bell returned was promoted to colonel of the 12th Tennessee Infantry Regiment in May 1862. He continued as colonel of the consolidated 12th Tennessee Infantry and 22nd Tennessee Infantry when the regiments were combined on June 17, 1862. Bell led the regiment in the Confederate invasion of Kentucky and the Battle of Richmond, and operations around Corinth, Mississippi.

After this service, Bell's consolidated regiment was further merged with the 47th Tennessee Volunteer Infantry Regiment on October 30, 1862. Bell became an supernumerary, or extra, officer. After some garrison duty at Shelbyville, Tennessee, Bell was assigned to recruiting duty for Major General Nathan Bedford Forrest's cavalry. In Spring, 1863, Colonel Bell was given a cavalry command under Forrest. Bell's regiment menaced the Union flank and rear at the Battle of Stones River.

In January 1864, Forrest gave Bell command of the Third Brigade, which operated independent from the divisions. Soon thereafter, in February 1864, Bell, still a Colonel, became commander of a brigade in Brigadier General Abraham Buford's division. Bell led this brigade for the rest of the war, receiving consistent praise.

In 1864, Bell and his brigade of Forrest's Cavalry Corps served at the Battle of Fort Pillow, the Battle of Brice's Crossroads, and against Union Brigadier General Andrew J. Smith's force in Mississippi in August 1864 after the Battle of Tupelo. Bell was wounded in the chest, back and face at Pulaski, Tennessee, on September 27, 1864. He continued to serve under Forrest and led his brigade at the Battle of Johnsonville fought November 4–5, 1864 in support of General John Bell Hood's Franklin-Nashville Campaign. At Johnsonville, Forrest's men destroyed property estimated at $6.7 million. They captured 26 artillery pieces and other supplies. Bell again was seriously wounded at Richland Creek in December while covering the retreat of Hood's Army of Tennessee after the Confederate rout at the Battle of Nashville.

Upon his return to duty, Tyree H. Bell was appointed a brigadier general in the Confederate States Army on February 28, 1865. At the end of the war, Bell participated in the defense of Georgia and Alabama against Union Brigadier General James H. Wilson's 1865 raid and at the Battle of Selma, Alabama. After surrendering with the rest of Forrest's troops on May 9, 1865, Bell was paroled at Gainesville, Alabama, on May 10, 1865.

== Later life ==
Ten years after the end of the war, Bell moved from Tennessee to Fresno County, California where he became a successful farmer and participated in civic affairs.

Tyree H. Bell died at New Orleans, Louisiana, August 30, 1902, while returning from a visit to his old home in Gallatin, Tennessee and a Confederate veteran reunion. He is buried in Bethel Cemetery, near Sanger, California.

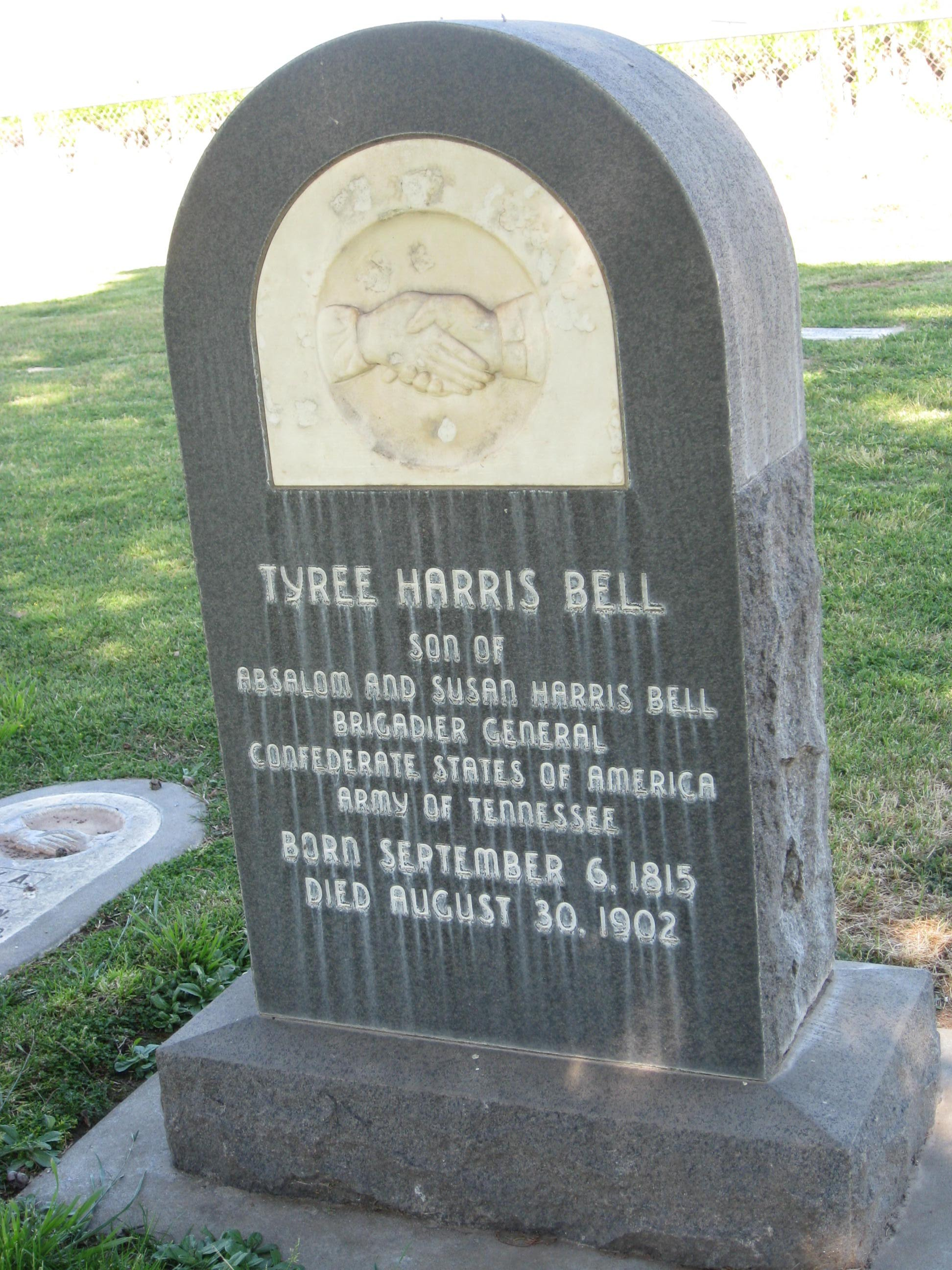
Tyree Harris Bell Grave Marker

== See also ==
- List of American Civil War generals (Confederate)
