= 14th Confederate Cavalry Regiment =

- Active: 1863–1865
- Country: Confederate States
- Branch: Confederate States Army
- Type: Cavalry
- Size: Regiment
- Engagements: American Civil War: Siege of Port Hudson; Grierson's Raid; Meridian Campaign; Battle of Tupelo; Wilson's Raid

The 14th Confederate Cavalry Regiment was a unit of the Confederate States Army during the American Civil War. Formed in 1863 from separate Louisiana and Mississippi cavalry battalions, the 14th Confederate regiment fought in numerous battles of the Western Theater.

== History ==
The 14th Confederate Cavalry Regiment was formed by combining two Louisiana and Mississippi battalions after the Confederate defeat at the Siege of Port Hudson. Major W.H. Garland's battalion of Mississippi cavalry had been on duty since October 1862 in Louisiana, and had suffered losses during Grierson's Raid in 1863. Major John B. Cage's battalion of Louisiana Cavalry had also fought skirmishes in the same region of Louisiana and Mississippi. On September 14, 1863 Garland's and Cage's battalions, along with another Louisiana company were consolidated to form the 14th Confederate Cavalry Regiment. Colonel Felix Dumonteil, formerly of the 10th Louisiana Infantry, was placed in command. The different companies of the regiment often operated independently on assignments in different parts of Mississippi and Louisiana. The 14th Confederate was considered a Confederate government unit rather than a unit from a particular state, as it contained companies from two different states.

The regiment was assigned to the brigades of Generals William Hicks Jackson and Wirt Adams at different times through 1863 and 1864, fighting in skirmishes against Union cavalry in Mississippi during the Meridian Campaign. The regiment was deployed against Southern Unionist guerillas operating out of the Honey Island Swamp in early 1864, before being assigned to the brigade of Colonel H.P. Mabry in the summer. At the Battle of Tupelo later that year, commanding officer Lieutenant Colonel John B. Cage was killed.

On March 3, 1865 Mabry's brigade was broken up and the 14th Confederate was reassigned to the Mississippi brigade of General Wirt Adams. General Nathan Bedford Forrest was placed in command of all remaining calvary forces in Alabama and Mississippi early that year, and his troops moved into Alabama during their final campaign. Following a defeat at the Battle of Selma, these remaining forces surrendered on May 22, 1865, at Gainesville, Alabama.

== Commanders ==
Commanders of the 14th Confederate Cavalry Regiment:

- Col. Felix Dumonteil
- Lt. Col. William H. Garland
- Lt. Col. John B. Cage, killed at Tupelo.

== See also ==
- List of Louisiana Civil War Confederate units
- List of Mississippi Civil War Confederate units
