= 6th Mississippi Cavalry Regiment =

- Active: 1863-1865
- Country: Confederate States of America
- Allegiance: Mississippi
- Branch: Confederate States Army; Forrest's Cavalry Corps
- Type: Cavalry
- Size: Regiment
- Battles: American Civil War: Battle of Tupelo

The 6th Mississippi Cavalry Regiment was a unit of the Confederate States Army from Mississippi. Organized in the later stages of the war, when much of its home state was in the hands of Union forces, the 6th Cavalry fought at the Battle of Tupelo in 1864, where it was decimated and lost its commanding officers.

== History ==
The 6th Cavalry was formed in October 1863 at Columbus by consolidating various companies of Mississippi State Troops cavalry for Confederate service. State Troops units, reporting to the Governor of Mississippi rather than the overall Confederate command, were organized in 1862 & 1863 but they were plagued by poor organization that limited their effectiveness as a military force. An inspection report of the State Troops cavalry in September 1863 reported a lack of order and high rates of absenteeism: "This command is generally not in good condition...The partisan and State troops are not reliable, being in poor discipline and over one-half the number on the rolls being at their homes...In raids of the enemy many of the partisan and State troops disperse...The State troops in their present unsettled state are but harbors for deserters and persons trying to avoid the military service." Pressed by Confederate demands for manpower, Mississippi Governor John J. Pettus agreed to transfer some of the State Troops cavalry units to regular Confederate Army service in mid-1863. Since many of the older men were already serving in the army, the troops of the 6th Mississippi Cavalry were mostly teenagers, with the youngest recruit only thirteen years old.

At this stage of the war much of North Mississippi was in Union hands, the critical strongpoint of Vicksburg along the Mississippi river had fallen, and the state capital of Jackson had been burned to the ground. Confederate cavalry strategy shifted to making hit-and-run attacks against Union supply depots and railroad infrastructure in order to disrupt Federal plans to move into Georgia. The 6th Cavalry was assigned to Colonel Hinche Parham Mabry's brigade, General Abraham Buford II's division, as part of General Nathan Bedford Forrest's Cavalry Corps.

After skirmishing with Federal troops at various points in Mississippi, the 6th Cavalry fought its first major battle at Tupelo in July 1864. The outnumbered Confederates were defeated and forced to withdraw, abandoning their plans to cut Union supply lines into Georgia. The regiment took 73 casualties in the battle, and the commanding officers of the regiment were killed. General Forrest wrote "The battle of Harrisburg [Tupelo] will furnish the historian a bloody record, but it will also stamp with immortality the gallant dead and the living heroes it has made. Prominent among the former the names of Colonel Isham Harrison and Lieutenant Colonel Thomas M. Nelson, of the Sixth Mississippi...will shine in fadeless splendor. They were lion-hearted officers and courteous officers. It was a sad blow that struck down these gallant spirits."

Following the battle, Mabry's brigade was broken up, and the 6th Mississippi was reassigned to the command of General Peter Burwell Starke. Forrest's cavalry retreated into Alabama in April, and Starke's brigade was posted near Livingston at the time of the Confederate surrender in May.

Another unrelated regiment, the 2nd Mississippi State Troops Cavalry commanded by Colonel William L. Lowry, was mustered into Confederate service in May 1864 and also designated the "6th Mississippi Cavalry", even though this name was already in use. However, this other unit which served in the brigade of General Samuel J. Gholson was more often simply referred to as "Lowry's Regiment".

== Commanders ==
Commanders of the 6th Mississippi Cavalry:

- Col. Isham Harrison, killed at the Battle of Tupelo.
- Lt. Col. Thomas M. Nelson, killed at Tupelo.
- Lt. Col. Thomas C. Lipscomb

== See also ==
- List of Mississippi Civil War Confederate units
