= Second Battle of Collierville =

1863 battle of the American Civil War

Battle of Collierville
- Part of the American Civil War
Date	November 3, 1863 (162 years ago)
Location	Shelby County, Tennessee 35.044°N 89.6645°W
Result	Union victory

Belligerents
United States (Union)	Confederate States

Commanders and leaders
(United States) Edward Hatch	(Confederate States of America) James R. Chalmers

Units involved
Third Cavalry Brigade	Chalmer's cavalry division

Strength
850	2,500

Casualties and losses
60	6 dead and 89 wounded or missing
- Location of Collierville in Tennessee

The Second Battle of Collierville (November 3, 1863), also known as the Action at Collierville, was fought during the American Civil War between the United States (Union) and Confederate States. The fighting occurred during a demonstration on Collierville, Tennessee, by Brigadier-General James R. Chalmers, Confederate States Army.

Four minor battles occurred in 1863 in Shelby County during a three-month period. The two largest battles occurred on October 11 and November 3, 1863. The battle on October 11 was the largest land battle fought in the county.
