= Battle of Okolona =

1864 battle of the American Civil War

Coordinates: 34.0021°N 88.7556°W

- Part of the American Civil War
Date	February 22, 1864 (162 years ago)
Location	Chickasaw County, Mississippi
Result	Confederate victory

Belligerents
Confederate States	United States (Union)

Commanders and leaders
(Confederate States of America) Nathan B. Forrest	(United States) William S. Smith

Units involved
Forrest's Cavalry Corps	Cavalry Division, 16th Army Corps

Strength
2,500	7,000

Casualties and losses
144	388
- Location of Okolona in Mississippi

The Battle of Okolona took place on February 22, 1864, in Chickasaw County, Mississippi, between Confederate and Union forces during the American Civil War. Confederate cavalry, commanded by Major-General Nathan B. Forrest, faced over 7,000 cavalry under the command of Brigadier-General William S. Smith and defeated them at Okolona, causing 100 casualties for the loss of 50.

Smith's force had been ordered to set off from Memphis, Tennessee, and rendezvous with the main Union army of 20,000 that was marching on Meridian, Mississippi, and was under the command of Major-General William T. Sherman. However, Smith disobeyed orders and delayed his march for ten days waiting on a unit that was ice bound in Kentucky. When he eventually left, he encountered the Confederate cavalry force on February 21, and on February 22 was engaged in a running battle across eleven miles with Forrest's forces. With Confederate reinforcements, Forrest routed Smith but did not pursue due to lack of ammunition, and Smith limped over the state line to Tennessee on February 26, where he was criticized for putting Sherman's Meridian campaign in danger.

== Background ==
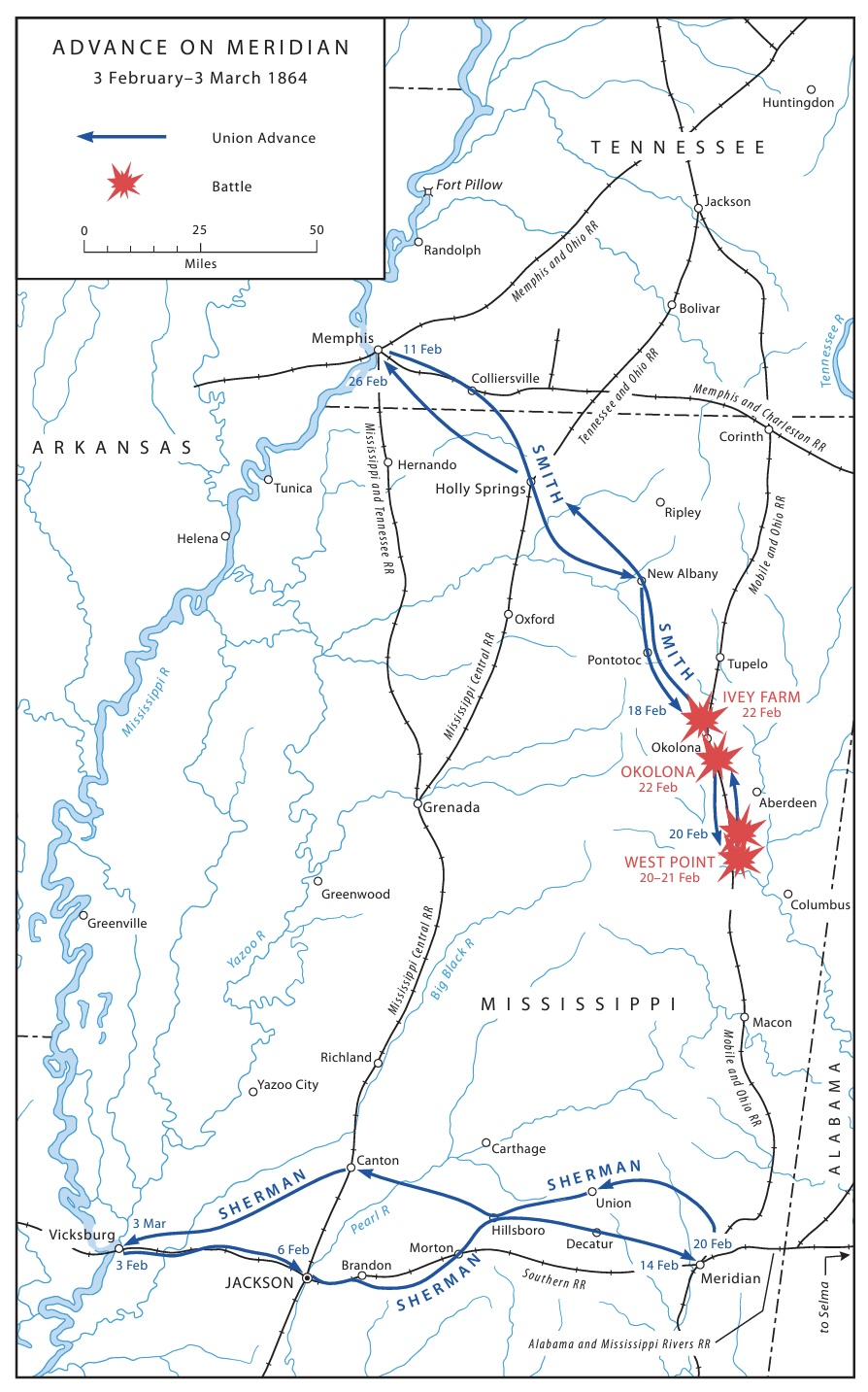
1864 Meridian campaign

Meridian was an important railroad center, and was the objective of a campaign launched from Vicksburg, Mississippi, on February 3 by Sherman, who brought 20,000 men to the outskirts of the town. Seven thousand cavalry under Smith's command were stationed in Memphis, and on February 1 these were ordered to leave for Meridian along the Mobile & Ohio Railroad and rendezvous with the main Union force on February 10. While Sherman feinted his way towards Meridian to throw off Confederate forces, Smith delayed his own advance for ten days before leaving on February 11. His force moved unopposed through the countryside, destroying railroads and crops as well as picking up 1,000 slaves. On February 16 he passed through New Albany, his progress slowed due to muddy roads. On February 18 he drove a Confederate force from West Point; and he was just outside West Point, 90 miles from Meridian, on February 20 when Sherman eventually left his position in the town and returned to Vicksburg, fearing for Smith's whereabouts. Smith, hearing of this, turned about and headed for Okolona.

Later on February 20, Smith fought an initial battle with Confederate forces under Forrest's command at Prairie Station and Aberdeen. On February 21, having decided to withdraw to West Point because of concern over the size of the Confederate forces and the fate of the slaves if they were captured, Smith was lured into the swampy area around the Tombigbee River by a Confederate cavalry brigade under Colonel Jeffrey E. Forrest. Smith was forced again to retreat, leaving a rearguard, which followed his main force two hours later.

== The battle ==
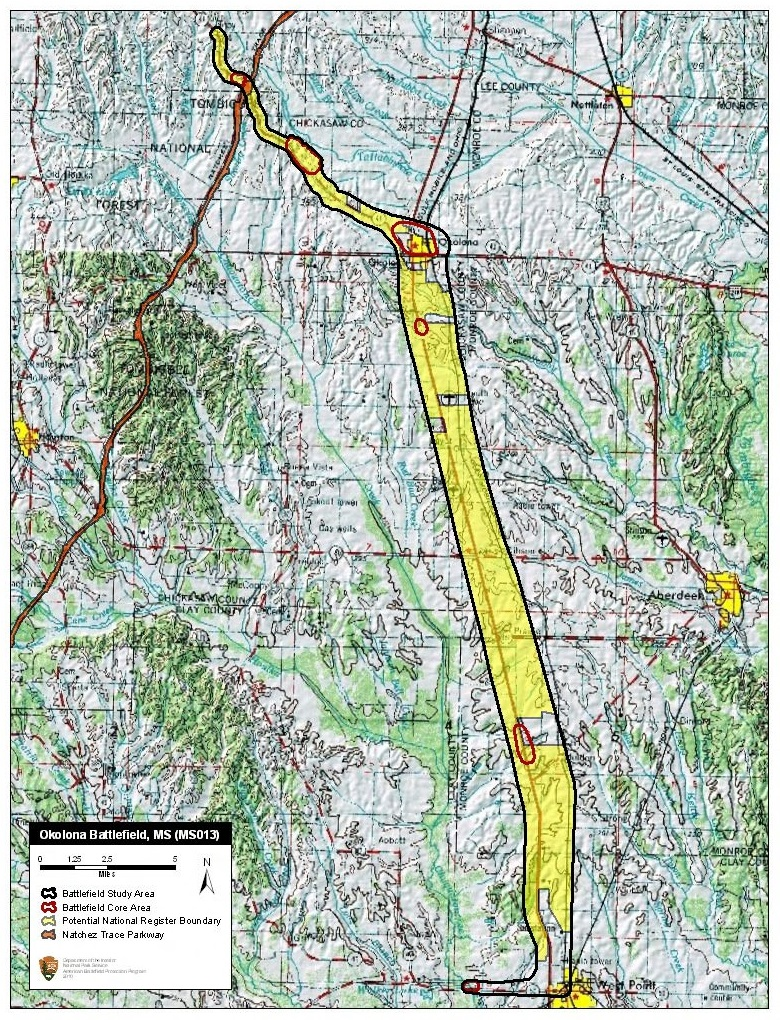
Okolona Battlefield core and study areas by the American Battlefield Protection Program

Forrest arrived to conduct the battle as the rearguard began to retreat, and led the first attack at dawn on February 22 on the prairie south of Okolona. The Union forces had dismounted and constructed barricades around their positions. Forrest began a frontal assault and probing flank attacks, and with Confederate reinforcements, cut gaps in the Union battle lines and prompted a general retreat, with five cannons being abandoned.

The Union forces reformed on a ridge, and during a flurry of attacks and counterattacks Col. Forrest, the major general's younger brother, was killed by a shot to the neck. He allegedly died in the arms of his brother, who muttered "Jeffrey, Jeffrey." Faltering after the colonel's death, the Confederate attack was revitalized by the older Forrest, who led a charge to "exact vengeance" and break the Union positions. During the pursuit, Forrest and his group were briefly overwhelmed before Col. McCullough arrived with reinforcements.

The Union forces began an eleven-mile running battle as they withdrew, falling back through a series of defensive positions including plantations and roadblocks. However, these positions were quickly abandoned in the face of Confederate attacks. Towards the end of the day, the Union forces drew into three lines on a field, and charged the Confederates, who used volley fire to disrupt both charges at a range of 40 yards. Facing such defeat, Smith began a further withdrawal. Forrest quickly ordered the end of the pursuit due to lack of ammunition, but Smith was forced to contend with other Mississippi militia units for the rest of his retreat to the Tennessee border.

At Collierville, Tennessee, Smith crossed the state line on February 26 with the remainder of his forces, where he was reprimanded for disobeying his initial orders to start out for Meridian on February 1. Due to failing health Smith left the military in September 1864 and returned to civilian life.

== Battlefield preservation ==
The American Battlefield Trust and its partners have acquired and preserved more than 269 acres (1.09 km^{2}) of the Okolona battlefield.
