= James Ronald Chalmers =

American politician (1831–1898)

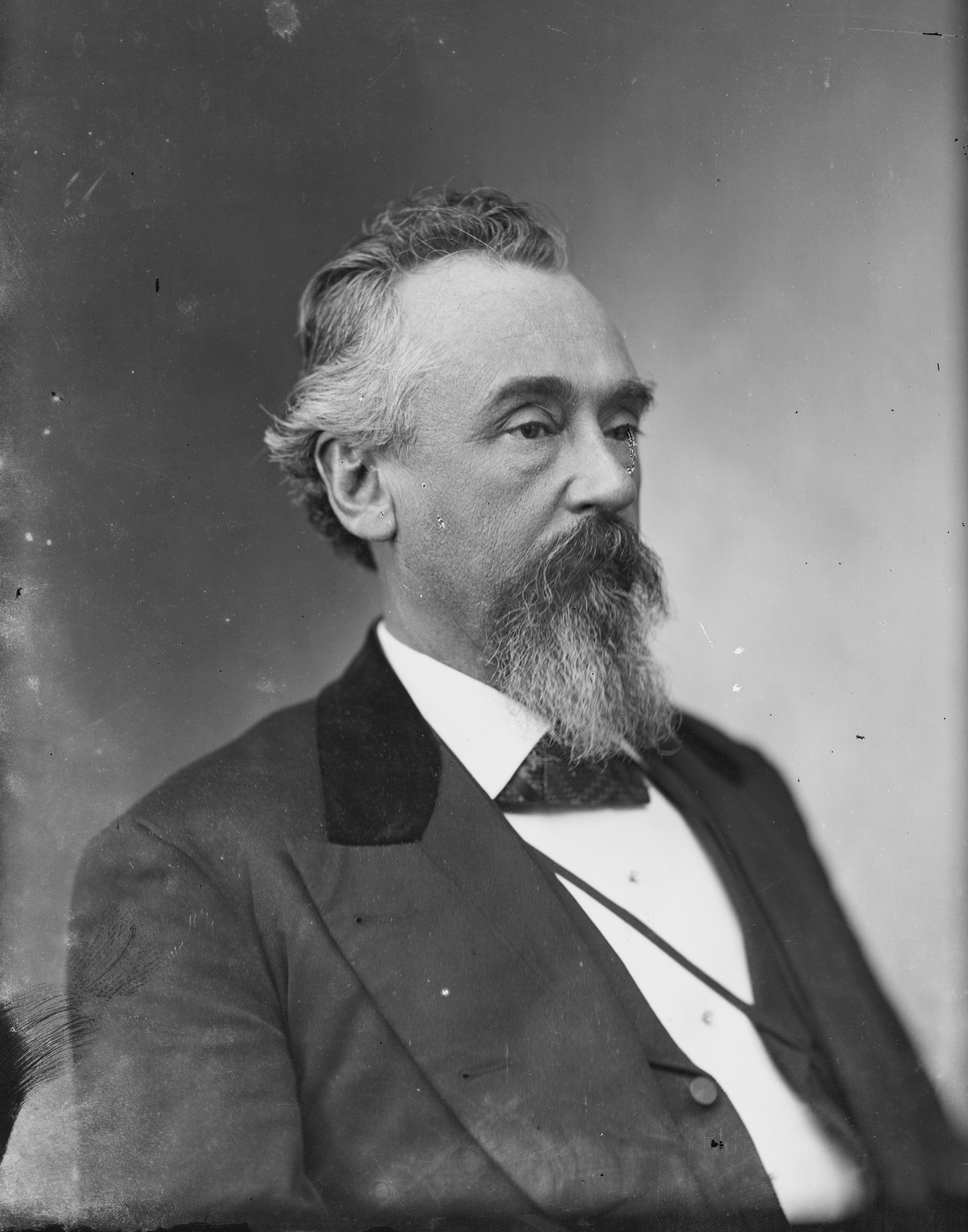

Member of the U.S. House of Representatives from Mississippi
- In office March 4, 1877 – April 29, 1882
- Preceded by: John R. Lynch
- Succeeded by: John R. Lynch
- Constituency: 6th district
- In office June 25, 1884 – March 3, 1885
- Preceded by: Van H. Manning
- Succeeded by: James B. Morgan
- Constituency: 2nd district

Personal details
- Born: January 11, 1831 Halifax County, Virginia, U.S.
- Died: April 9, 1898 (aged 67) Memphis, Tennessee, U.S.
- Resting place: Elmwood Cemetery, Memphis, Tennessee, U.S. 35°07′24″N 90°01′49″W
- Party: Democratic; Independent Democratic (1882); Free Silver Republican (1896)
- Relations: Joseph Williams Chalmers (father)

Military service
- Allegiance: Confederate States of America
- Branch: Confederate States Army
- Years of service: 1861–1865
- Rank: Brigadier-General
- Commands: 9th Mississippi Infantry; Chalmers' Cavalry Division, Forrest's Cavalry Corps
- Battles: American Civil War; Battle of Shiloh; Battle of Stones River; Battle of Collierville; Battle of Fort Pillow; Franklin–Nashville campaign

James Ronald Chalmers (January 11, 1831 – April 9, 1898) was an American politician, slaveowner, and general in the Confederate States Army who commanded infantry and cavalry in the Western Theater of the American Civil War.

After the war, Chalmers served as a state senator in Mississippi and United States Congressman for several terms from the state's 6th congressional district, beginning in 1876. He was re-elected in 1880 but the election was contested by his Republican African-American opponent, John R. Lynch. Congress awarded the seat to Lynch because of marked election fraud by the Democrats. In 1882 Chalmers ran as an Independent Democrat on a fusionist ticket, with support by Republicans and Greenbackers. He contested the victory of the regular Democrat, and Congress finally awarded the seat to Chalmers, seating him in 1884. He left politics after losing election in the fall of 1884.

== Early life, education and career ==
James Ronald Chalmers was born in Halifax County, Virginia, January 11, 1831. His father was Joseph Chalmers, who, having moved to Mississippi with his family when James was a boy, settled in Holly Springs in 1839. The older Chalmers was first appointed by the governor to fill a term, then elected by the state legislature as U. S. Senator. James R. Chalmers attended South Carolina College at Columbia, where he graduated in 1851.

Chalmers returned to Holly Springs to read law with an established firm, and was admitted to the bar in 1853. After a few years of practice, Chalmers was elected as district attorney in 1858. By 1860 he held forty four people as slaves. He was elected as a delegate to the Mississippi secession convention which voted to take the state out of the Union on January 9, 1861. Chalmers was a pro-slavery Democrat, like his father, and he voted in favor of secession.

== American Civil War ==
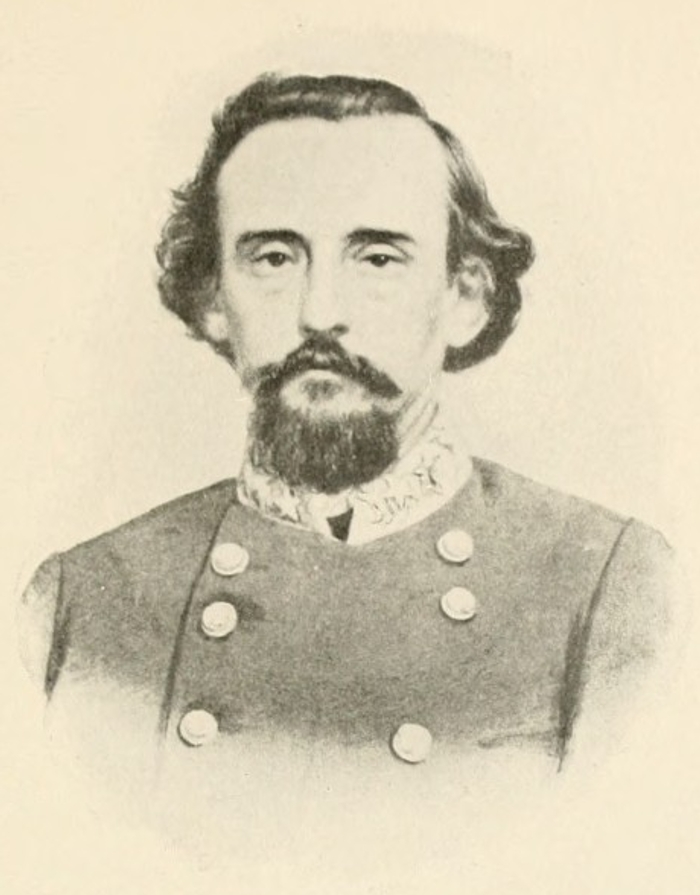
Chalmers in uniform, c. 1862

Chalmers entered the Confederate States Army as a captain and was soon promoted to Colonel of the 9th Mississippi Infantry in 1861. For a while he commanded at Pensacola, Florida. On February 13, 1862, he was promoted to brigadier-general, and on April 6 was assigned to the command of Second Brigade, Withers' Division, Army of the Mississippi, leading his brigade at the Battle of Shiloh that month. When Bragg was conducting operations in north Mississippi he sent Chalmers with a force of cavalry to make a feint upon Rienzi, Mississippi in order to cover the movement of a body of infantry to Ripley, Mississippi. In executing this order he encountered Union Colonel Sheridan's troops at the Battle of Booneville on July 1, where the outnumbered Federal troops inflicted a defeat on Chalmers' larger force.

When Bragg advanced into Kentucky in the summer of 1862 Chalmers' command was a part of his force, fighting at the Battle of Murfreesboro at the end of the year. In April, 1863, at the request of John C. Pemberton, he was transferred to the Department of Mississippi and East Louisiana and placed in command of the Fifth Military District. The district consisted of the top two tiers of counties in Mississippi. In 1864 he was assigned to the command of cavalry brigades of Jeffrey Forrest and McCulloch, forming the first division of Forrest's Cavalry Corps. This cavalry division was subsequently enlarged by the addition of Rucker's Brigade.

Chalmers played an important role in the campaigns of Forrest in north Mississippi, west Tennessee and Kentucky. He also led forces in Hood's Tennessee Campaign. On February 18, 1865, Chalmers was put in command of all the Mississippi cavalry in the Confederate service in Mississippi and west Tennessee. Chalmers' command surrendered along with Forrest in May, 1865.

== Fort Pillow Massacre ==
Troops under Chalmers' command committed one of the most infamous atrocities of the Civil War on April 12, 1864, at Fort Pillow, Tennessee. Chalmers was assigned to capture the fort, which was mostly defended by Black soldiers of the United States Colored Troops. After the Confederates demanded the fort's unconditional surrender and the Union commanding officer refused, Chalmers launched an assault and the fort was quickly overrun in less than 30 minutes. Both sides suffered combat casualties during the Confederate assault, but according to witnesses the surrendering Black soldiers were singled out for execution by Chalmers' troops rather than being treated as prisoners of war.

A Union officer sent under a truce to collect bodies after the battle reported that the corpses of some Black soldiers showed signs of execution rather than battle wounds: "Some of them were burned as if by powder around the holes in their heads, which led me to conclude that they were shot at very close range". The same officer reported that Chalmers admitted that his men had shot down the Black soldiers in cold blood: "One of the gun-boat officers who accompanied us asked General Chalmers if the most of the negroes were not killed after they (the enemy) had taken possession. Chalmers replied that he thought they had been, and that the men of General Forrest's command had such a hatred toward the armed negro that they could not be restrained from killing the negroes after they had captured them. He said they were not killed by General Forrest's or his orders, but that both Forrest and he stopped the massacre as soon as they were able to do so. He said it was nothing better than we could expected so long as we persisted in arming the negro."

Of the Union troops present at the fort, 66 percent of the Black soldiers and 35 percent of the white soldiers were killed. Neither Chalmers nor Forrest were ever held criminally responsible for the killings.

== Mississippi State Senate ==
In the waning days of the Reconstruction era, Chalmers was elected to the State Senate in 1875 and 1876. Democrats regained control of the House of Representatives in 1875 on the national level, for the first time since the Civil War. The campaign seasons in Mississippi were accompanied by increasing violence. Chapters of Red Shirts, a paramilitary group working for the Democratic Party that sought to disrupt and suppress Republican voting, helped Democrats win seats in Mississippi and the Carolinas.

== U.S. House of Representatives ==
In 1876 Chalmers was elected as Representative from Mississippi's 6th congressional district to the Congress of the United States, serving in the Forty-fifth and Forty-sixth Congresses, from March 4, 1877 – March 3, 1881. His Republican opponent John R. Lynch contested the victory, as he was previously strongly elected from this black-majority district. With Congress dominated by Democrats, the Election Committee refused to hear the case.

Chalmers won re-election and received the certificate of election to the Forty-seventh Congress in 1880, serving from March 4, 1881 – April 29, 1882. That time his seat was successfully contested by Republican candidate Lynch.

When his case came before the Committee on Elections on April 27, 1882, Lynch argued that in five counties, more than 5,000 of his votes had been counted for Chalmers. He further asserted that several thousand Republican ballots had been thrown out after a secret hearing because of technicalities such as a clerical failure to send a list of names with the returns and the presence of unusual marks on the ballots. Lynch's strongest arguments were based on Chalmers's remarks that Lynch's votes had been thrown out and that he (Chalmers) was "in favor of using every means short of violence to preserve [for] intelligent white people of Mississippi supreme control of political affairs." The committee ruled in Lynch's favor, and on April 29, 1882, the House voted 125 to 83 to seat him; 62 Members abstained.

Lynch served the remainder of the term.

In the fall of 1882, Chalmers ran as an Independent Democrat as part of a fusion ticket supported by Republicans and the Greenback Party, to the Forty-eighth Congress. Democrat Van H. Manning claimed victory, and Chalmers contested the legality of the election. Chalmers finally was verified by Congress as the winner and allowed to take his seat on June 25, 1884. He was unsuccessful in running for re-election in 1884.

Chalmers wrote to Republican President Chester A. Arthur in December 1882 about how to defeat the regular Democrats in Mississippi. Independents like him sometimes affiliated with Greenbackers, other men who had left the regular party, and even Republicans in a fusionist ticket. In this period, Senator William Mahone of Virginia had gathered various factions into what was called the Readjuster Party, which was prominent in Virginia politics. Chalmers proposed the same for Mississippi. Neither he nor Mahone were successful in breaking up Mississippi Democrats or the Solid South.

== Later life ==
After failing to win election in 1884, Chalmers left politics, returning to full-time practice of law. He moved his practice to Memphis, Tennessee, where he died in April 1898.

== See also ==
- List of Confederate States Army generals
- List of United States representatives from Mississippi

U.S. House of Representatives
Preceded by John R. Lynch	Member of the U.S. House of Representatives from Mississippi's 6th congressional district 1877–1882	Succeeded by John R. Lynch
Preceded by Van H. Manning	Member of the U.S. House of Representatives from Mississippi's 2nd congressional district 1884–1885	Succeeded by James B. Morgan
