= Forrest's Cavalry Corps =

Corps of the Confederate States Army

- Flag of Forrest's Cavalry Corps
- Active: 1863–1865
- Disbanded: May 3, 1865
- Country: Confederate States
- Branch: Army
- Type: Cavalry
- Size: Corps
- Part of: Army of Tennessee
- Battles: American Civil War; Battle of Chickamauga; Battle of Fort Pillow; Battle of Brice's Crossroads; Battle of Tupelo; Second Battle of Memphis; Battle of Johnsonville; Third Battle of Murfreesboro; Battle of Nashville; Battle of Selma

Commanders
- Commanding officers: Lieut. Gen. Earl Van Dorn (March 1863–May 63); Lieut. Gen. Nathan Bedford Forrest (May 1863–65)

Forrest's Cavalry Corps was a cavalry formation of the Confederate States Army in the Western Theater of the Civil War commanded by Lieutenant General Nathan Bedford Forrest.

Formed during the summer of 1862, it took part in the various battles in the Western Theater during the second half of the war. At first serving as part of the Army of Tennessee, both Forrest and the corps were then transferred to northern Mississippi and often launched independent raids into Union occupied western and central Tennessee.

== History ==
=== 1863 ===
In May 1863, Nathan Bedford Forrest was given the cavalry command of Earl Van Dorn, who had recently been murdered. The corps initially consisted of the divisions of William H. Jackson and Frank C. Armstrong but Jackson's division was soon sent to Mississippi, leaving Forrest with only Armstrong's division. On September 3, Braxton Bragg, commander of the Army of Tennessee, gave Forrest the division of John Pegram and placed him in command of all the cavalry north of Chattanooga. During the early stages of the Chickamauga Campaign, Forrest's corps served on the army's right as a rear guard during the retreat from Chattanooga, while Forrest himself was wounded during the fighting. The corps covered the right flank of D. H. Hill's corps during the Battle of Chickamauga, earning praise from Hill. On the morning of September 21, following the Confederate victory in the battle, Forrest rode towards Chattanooga with four hundred men and found that the Union army was still in chaos; he urged Bragg to attack the city immediately but Bragg instead settled in for a siege of the Union garrison.

"General Forrest, I wish to congratulate you and those brave men moving across that field like veteran infantry upon their magnificent behavior . . . No one can speak disparagingly of such troops as yours."

— D. H. Hill, at the Battle of Chickamauga

During the early stages of the Chattanooga campaign, Bragg ordered Forrest to transfer the majority of his corps to Joseph Wheeler's cavalry corps, which was about to raid the Union supply lines into Chattanooga. Much has been made of Forrest threatening Bragg, the famous story comes from John Wyeth’s 1899 biography: The Life of General Nathan Forrest. The official records seem to show a respectful relationship between Bragg and Forrest. The original source was James Cowan, a surgeon in the Confederate army and Forrest’s cousin who was the only actual eyewitness. However, Cowan’s recounting suggests that Jefferson Davis was also there, which is not possible. In Wyeth’s second edition, he removed this story.

Whatever actually happened, Bragg transferred three of Forrest’s brigades into Wheeler’s Corps, but not Forrest himself. Forrest had asked to be transferred back to West TN in late August, with a battery, his escort and a battalion of Cavalry, which is exactly what Bragg did, so no reason to even confront him.

The local Union commanders attempted to surround the Confederates in Jackson but Forrest managed to retreat back to Mississippi at the end of December. Once in Holly Springs, he organized his recruits into a cavalry corps with two divisions commanded by James R. Chalmers and Abraham Buford. Forrest was promoted to major-general but Chalmers did not want to serve under him and threatened to leave his command. Chalmers was convinced to remain with Forrest.

=== 1864 ===
The first test of his new cavalry corps began with General Sherman's Meridian Expedition that culminated in the Battle of Meridian. While Sherman moved 20,000 infantry from Vicksburg, General William Sooy Smith was to lead a large force of Union cavalry from Collierville, TN, and meet him at Meridian while destroying the railroad and the crops in the rich prairie. General Forrest moved his cavalry into position and struck the Union cavalry from three directions at Battle of Okolona on February 22. This was a minor victory but it was good practice for more raids out of Memphis by Union cavalry. On March 16, Forrest launched another raid into western Tennessee to capture Union supplies for his corps and to allow his Kentucky and Tennessee troops to return home. Forrest established his headquarters at Jackson and from there, he moved his brigades to attack Union installations: Union City, TN, on March 24; Battle of Paducah (Fort Anderson), Kentucky, on March 24; and Battle of Fort Pillow (also known as the Fort Pillow massacre) on April 12, which ended with a massacre of African-American Union troops and their white officers attempting to surrender. On May 2, his corps began their return into central Mississippi.

In June Union general Samuel D. Sturgis led an expedition into northern Mississippi to keep Forrest from raiding Union supply lines during the Atlanta Campaign. On June 10, Forrest attacked Sturgis in the Battle of Brice's Crossroads and routed the Union force. Despite losing nearly 500 men, he inflicted over 2,200 casualties and captured 16 cannons, 176 wagons, and 1,500 small arms. Following Forrest's victory, several in the Western Theater, including Joseph E. Johnston and Georgia Governor Joseph E. Brown, urged that Forrest's corps be used to raid William T. Sherman's supply lines; Davis turned down the requests.

In late June, Union Major General Andrew J. Smith launched another expedition into Mississippi to tie down the Confederate forces in the region. Forrest united with an infantry force commanded by Stephen Lee and attacked the Union forces near Harrisburg, Mississippi, on July 14; uncoordinated Confederate attacks on the Union right wing resulted in a Union victory. Only 3,500 of Forrest's and Lee's 7,000 men joined in the attack and 1,300 became casualties; Smith lost only 674 men. Despite his victory, Smith retreated from the field towards Tupelo, where Forrest attacked again the next day and was again defeated. During the Battle of Tupelo, Forrest was wounded in the right thigh and was forced to turn command over to Chalmers.

In mid-September, Forrest launched a raid into northern Alabama and central Tennessee to disrupt Sherman's supply lines, returning to northern Mississippi in early October. Although he was able to capture nearly 2,400 Union soldiers and many supplies, Sherman captured Atlanta in early September, before Forrest had started his raid. Despite this failure, Forrest launched another raid in mid-October, in another attempt to cut the Union supply lines to Atlanta and force Sherman to abandon the city. After arriving in western Tennessee, he was forced to disperse many of his men so they could obtain fresh mounts. With less than 3,000 men, Forrest set up artillery positions along the Tennessee River which forced the surrender of several supply ships and the gunboat Undine. On the evening of November 3, 1864, Forrest's artillerist, Capt. John Morton, positioned his guns across the river from the Federal supply base at Johnsonville. On the morning of November 4, Undine and the Confederate batteries were attacked by three Union gunboats from Johnsonville under U.S. Navy Lt. Edward M. King and by the six Paducah gunboats under Lt. Cmdr. LeRoy Fitch. Capt. Frank M. Gracey (a former steamboat captain now serving as a Confederate cavalryman) abandoned Undine, setting her on fire, which caused her ammunition magazine to explode, ending Forrest's brief career as a naval commander. Despite this loss, the Confederate land artillery was completely effective in neutralizing the threat of the Federal fleets. Fitch was reluctant to take his Paducah gunboats through the narrow channel between Reynoldsburg Island and the western bank, so limited himself to long-range fire. King withered under the Confederate fire, which hit one of his vessels 19 times, and returned to Johnsonville.

Capt. Morton's guns bombarded the Union supply depot and the 28 steamboats and barges positioned at the wharf. All three of the Union gunboats—Key West, Tawah, and Elfin—were disabled or destroyed.[7] The Union garrison commander ordered that the supply vessels be burned to prevent their capture by the Confederates. Forrest observed, "By night the wharf for nearly one mile up and down the river presented one solid sheet of flame. ... Having completed the work designed for the expedition, I moved my command six miles during the night by the light of the enemy's burning property. Forrest caused enormous damage at very low cost. He reported only 2 men killed and 9 wounded. He described the Union losses as 4 gunboats, 14 transports, 20 barges, 26 pieces of artillery, $6,700,000 worth of property, and 150 prisoners. One Union officer described the monetary loss as about $2,200,000.

At this time, Forrest was ordered to move into northern Alabama to unite with the Army of Tennessee, now commanded by John B. Hood. Hood was launching an invasion of central Tennessee and wanted Forrest's corps to replace the cavalry corps of Joseph Wheeler, who was on detached duty in Georgia. Due to poor roads and swollen rivers, Forrest was unable to reach Hood's army until November 18; many of his men were still in western Tennessee trying to find mounts and Forrest had only 6,000 men at that point. Once united with the army, the division of William H. Jackson was attached to Forrest's corps. At Spring Hill, Forrest was ordered to seize the town and cut off the Union line of retreat but the Union garrison was stronger than Hood had anticipated. By the time the Confederate infantry had arrived, the rest of the Union army had also arrived and stalled the Confederate attacks. During the night, Forrest attempted to cut the Columbia-to-Franklin turnpike but the Union army repulsed that attack as well, while Forrest was unable to counterattack due to a shortage of ammunition. The next morning, Forrest served as the advance guard during the march to Franklin, where his corps was deployed on the Confederate flanks during the following battle (Chalmer's division on the far left flank, Buford's division on the right flank along the western bank of the Harpeth River, and Jackson's division on the eastern bank of the river). During the Confederate attack, Buford's division failed to reach the Union line due to heavy defensive artillery and rifle fire; Chalmer's division attacked at about 5 p.m. but Chalmers felt that the Union position was too strong for a full-scale attack. Following the Union retreat to Nashville, Hood detached Forrest's corps to make raids on the Union posts in central Tennessee; Forrest was able to capture several blockhouses and destroyed several miles of tracks. Convinced that the town of Murfreesboro was the key to the capture of Nashville, Hood ordered Forrest to take two of his cavalry divisions and William Bate's infantry division and capture the Union post there. Forrest's attack on December 7 failed, with a loss of over 200 prisoners and several cannons. Bate's division was returned to Nashville the next day and Forrest was ordered to patrol the area between Nashville and Murfreesboro. After the Confederate defeat in the Battle of Nashville, Forrest commanded the rear guard composed of his cavalry and eight infantry brigades of his own choosing. Forrest's men fought several skirmishes which helped slow down the Union pursuit.

=== 1865 ===
After the campaign ended, Forrest regrouped his corps in northern Mississippi, where he attempted to replenish his equipment and recruit additional men, even offering a twenty-day furlough to any man who brought in a new recruit. In January, Richard Taylor named Forrest commander of all cavalry units in the Department of Alabama, Mississippi, and East Louisiana; Forrest reorganized his forces into four divisions split along state lines, commanded by Chalmers, Buford, Jackson, and Tyree Bell.

"Any man who is in favor of a further prosecution of this war is a fit subject for a lunatic asylum, and ought to be sent there immediately."

— Nathan B. Forrest, on May 3, to those who suggested he continue fighting.

Union diversions staged throughout the early months of 1865 forced Forrest to disperse his men across a wide region. In late March, Union Brigadier General James H. Wilson started a massive raid through Alabama, with the intention of destroying Confederate industrial centers, especially the factories located at Selma, Alabama. Forrest attempted to delay Wilson near Plantersville on April 1 in order to gain time for his scattered force to concentrate but Wilson overran the Confederate positions, taking 300 prisoners and forcing Forrest to retreat into the defenses of Selma. Once in Selma, Forrest attempted to gather every man capable of fighting, including the local home guard and militia, into the city's defenses works but he had too few troops to adequately man the works. Wilson launched an attack in the late afternoon of April 2 and quickly overran the defenses, capturing 2,700 men and thirty cannons while losing only 350 men himself. Over the next few weeks, Forrest attempted to gather and reorganize his corps; when he received word that Taylor had surrendered his department, Forrest formally surrendered his command on May 9.

== Organizational history ==
The composition of the Cavalry Corps changed many times throughout the war as units frequently transferred in and out, and new regiments were formed at different times to consolidate understrength organizations. After serving as a brigade commander, in 1863 Forrest was assigned command of the Cavalry Corps in General Braxton Bragg's Army of Tennessee. Following the Battle of Chickamauga in September, Bragg reassigned nearly all the troops comprising Forrest's 1863 corps, leaving Forrest with only 310 troops from his original command. Forrest then recruited an entirely-new cavalry corps, finishing this reorganization in January 1864. In the final months of the war, all of the cavalry in the Department of Alabama, Mississippi, and East Louisiana came under Forrest's control, adding many new regiments to the corps that had previously been part of other commands.

The central nucleus of Forrest's Cavalry Corps was a group of Kentucky, Tennessee, and Mississippi cavalry regiments who took part in Forrest's most famous battles in 1864 and remained with him until the end of the war. Other units assigned to Forrest's command (some only temporarily) came from Arkansas, Georgia, Louisiana, Missouri, North Carolina, and Texas. No units from Florida, South Carolina, Virginia, or the Confederate territories were ever part of Forrest's Cavalry Corps.

== Controversies ==
One of the most infamous atrocities of the Civil War took place at Fort Pillow, Tennessee, when troops from Forrest's Cavalry Corps summarily executed Black Union prisoners. Fort Pillow, mostly defended by Black soldiers of the United States Colored Troops, was surrounded by Chalmers' division of Forrest's Cavalry Corps on April 12, 1864. After Forrest demanded the fort's unconditional surrender and the Union commanding officer Major William Bradford refused, Forrest ordered an attack on the fort's defenses. The fort was quickly overrun in less than 30 minutes, with both sides suffering combat casualties during the Confederate assault, but according to witnesses the surrendering Black soldiers were singled out for execution by Forrest's troops rather than being treated as prisoners of war.

A Confederate soldier who took part in the attack reported one week later in a letter to a family member: “The slaughter was awful. The poor deluded negroes would run up to our men fall upon their knees and with uplifted hands scream for mercy but they were ordered to their feet and then shot down. The white men fared but little better. Their fort turned out to be a great slaughter pen. Blood, human blood stood about in pools and brains could have been gathered up in any quantity. I with several others tried to stop the butchery and at one time had partially succeeded but Gen. Forrest ordered them shot down like dogs, and the carnage continued." A Union officer sent under a truce to collect bodies after the battle reported that the bodies of some Black soldiers showed signs of execution rather than battle wounds: "Some of them were burned as if by powder around the holes in their heads, which led me to conclude that they were shot at very close range". Of the Union troops present at the fort, 66 percent of the Black soldiers and 35 percent of the white soldiers were killed.

The killings sparked outrage in the North and led to Forrest and his soldiers being described as a "butchers". Lost Cause apologists tend to downplay the atrocity, claiming that most of the Union troops were killed in combat rather than being executed, while also minimizing Forrest's personal involvement in the massacre.

Despite the reputation ascribed to Forrest following Fort Pillow, his Cavalry Corps did not operate a general policy of extermination towards captured Black soldiers. Forrest preferred to use Black prisoners as slave labor instead, as he wrote in a letter in June 1864: "I regard captured negroes as I do other captured property and not as captured soldiers...It is not the policy nor the interest of the South to destroy the negro". For example, following the Battle of Sulphur Creek Trestle in September 1864, Black soldiers of the 110th & 111th US Colored Troops captured by Forrest's men were not executed, but instead were sent to Mobile, Alabama to perform forced labor on the city's fortifications.

== See also ==
- Cavalry Corps, Army of Northern Virginia
