= Bibliography of American Civil War military leaders =

The American Civil War bibliography comprises books that deal in large part with the American Civil War. There are over 60,000 books on the war, with more appearing each month. There is no complete bibliography to the war; the largest guide to books is over 40 years old and lists over 6,000 titles.

Note: This article forms part of Bibliography of the American Civil War

== Union military leaders ==
=== General reference ===
- American National Biography 24 vol (1999).
- Bledsoe, Andrew S. Citizen-Officers: The Union and Confederate Volunteer Junior Officer Corps in the American Civil War. Baton Rouge, Louisiana: Louisiana State University Press, 2015. ISBN 978-0-8071-6070-1.
- Castel, Albert, with Brooks D. Simpson. Victors in Blue: How Union Generals Fought the Confederates, Battled Each Other, and Won the Civil War. Lawrence, Kansas: University Press of Kansas, 2011.
- Hunt, Roger D. Colonels in Blue: Indiana, Kentucky and Tennessee. Jefferson, NC: McFarland and Company, Inc., 2014. ISBN 978-0-7864-7318-2.
- Hunt, Roger D. Colonels in Blue: Michigan, Ohio and West Virginia. Jefferson, NC: McFarland and Company, Inc., 2011. ISBN 978-0-7864-6155-4.
- Hunt, Roger D. Colonels in Blue: Union Army Colonels of the Civil War: The Mid–Atlantic States: Pennsylvania, New Jersey, Maryland, Delaware and the District of Columbia. Atglen, PA: Schiffer Publishing, Ltd., 2003. ISBN 978-0-7643-1771-2.
- Hunt, Roger D. Colonels in Blue: Union Army Colonels of the Civil War: New England. Atglen, PA: Schiffer Publishing, 2011. ISBN 978-0-7643-1290-8.
- Hunt, Roger D. Colonels in Blue: Union Army Colonels of the Civil War: New York. Mechanicsburg, PA: Stackpole Books, 2007. ISBN 978-0-8117-0253-9.
- Hunt, Roger D. and Jack R. Brown. Brevet Brigadier Generals in Blue. Gaithersburg, Maryland: Olde Soldier Books, Inc., 1990. ISBN 978-1-56013-002-4.
- Kramer, Carl E. Civil War Generals of Indiana. The History Press, 2022. ISBN 9781467151955.
- Longacre, Edward G. Lincoln's Cavalrymen: A History of the Mounted Forces of the Army of the Potomac. Mechanicsburg, Pennsylvania: Stackpole Books, 2000. ISBN 0-8117-1049-1.
- McHenry, Robert ed. Webster's American Military Biographies (1978)
- Meyers, Christopher C. Union General John A. McClernand and the Politics of Command. Jefferson, North Carolina: McFarland, 2010.
- Ofele, Martin W. German-Speaking Officers in the U.S. Colored Troops, 1863–1867. Gainesville, Florida: University Press of Florida, 2004.
- Ruffner, Kevin Conley. Maryland's Blue & Gray: A Border State's Union and Confederate Junior Officer Corps. Baton Rouge, Louisiana: Louisiana State University Press, 1997.
- Warner, Ezra J., Generals in Blue: Lives of the Union Commanders. Baton Rouge, Louisiana: Louisiana State University Press, 1964. ISBN 0-8071-0822-7.
- Woodworth, Steven E., editor. Grant's Lieutenants: From Cairo to Vicksburg. Lawrence, Kansas: University Press of Kansas, 2001.
- Work, David. Lincoln's Political Generals. Urbanna, Illinois: University of Illinois Press, 2009. ISBN 978-0-2520-3445-9.

=== Works on individual leaders ===
- Alberts, Don E. Brandy Station to Manila Bay: A Biography of General Wesley Merritt. Presidial Press, 1980. ISBN 978-0-686-26105-6.
- Ames, Blanche A. Adelbert Ames: General, Senator, Governor, 1835–1933. New York: 1964.
- Asher, Brad. The Most Hated Man in Kentucky: The Lost Cause and the Legacy of Union General Stephen Burbridge. University Press of Kentucky, 2021. ISBN 9780813181370.
- Averell, William Woods. Ten Years in the Saddle: The Memoir of William Woods Averell 1851–1862. Stan Clark Military Books, 1996. ISBN 978-0-89141-024-9.
- Barthel, Thomas. Abner Doubleday – A Civil War Biography. Jefferson, North Carolina: McFarland & Company, 2010. ISBN 978-0-7864-4561-5.
- Belcher, Dennis W. General David S. Stanley, USA: A Civil War Biography. McFarland & Company, 2014. ISBN 978-0-7864-7645-9.
- Bennett, Brian A. The Beau Ideal Of A Gentleman: The Life Of Col. Patrick Henry O'Rorke. Schroeder Publications, 2012. ISBN 978-1-889246-48-2.
- Betts, Jr., William W. Rank and Gravity: The Life of General John Armstrong of Carlisle. Holly Springs, North Carolina: Heritage Books, 2011. ISBN 978-0-7884-5273-4.
- Bundy, Carol. The Nature of Sacrifice: A Biography of Charles Russell Lowell Jr., 1835–1864. New York: Farrar, Straus and Giroux, 2005.
- Burgess, Milton V. David Gregg: Pennsylvania Cavalryman. published by author: 1984.
- Burnet, Particia B. James F. Jaquess: Scholar, Soldier and Private Agent for President Lincoln. Jefferson, North Carolina: McFarland & Company, Inc., 2013. ISBN 978-0-7864-7358-8.
- Bush, Bryan S. The Butcher Burbridge: Union General Stephen Burbridge and His Reign of Terror Over Kentucky. Acclaim Press, 2008. ISBN 0-9798802-5-4.
- Callaghan, Daniel M. Thomas Francis Meagher and the Irish Brigade in the Civil War. Jefferson, North Carolina: McFarland & Company, Inc., 2011. ISBN 978-0-7864-6606-1.
- Casstevens, Frances H. Edward A. Wild And the African Brigade in the Civil War. McFarland & Company, 2003. ISBN 978-0-7864-1604-2.
- Chaffin, Tom. Pathfinder: John Charles Fremont and the Course of American Empire. New York: Hill and Wang, 2002.
- Chicoine, Stephen. John Basil Turchin and the Fight to Free the Slaves. Praeger, 2003. ISBN 978-0-275-97441-1.
- Clark, Donald A. The Notorious "Bull" Nelson: Murdered Civil War General. Southern Illinois University Press, 2011.
- Collins, Robert. General James G. Blunt: Tarnished Glory. Gretna, Louisiana: Pelican Publishing Company, 2005. ISBN 978-1-58980-253-7.
- Connor, Robert C. General Gordon Granger: The Savior of Chickamauga and the Man Behind "Juneteenth". Casemate Press, 2013. ISBN 978-1-61200-185-2.
- Cooper, Edward S. William Babcock Hazen: The Best Hated Man. Madison, New Jersey: Fairleigh Dickinson University Press, 2005. ISBN 0-8386-4089-3.
- Cornish, Dudley Taylor & Virginia Jeans Laas. Lincoln's Lee: The Life of Samuel Phillips Lee, United States Navy, 1812–1897.. Lawrence, Kansas: University Press of Kansas, 1986. ISBN 0-7006-0296-8.
- Craig, Reginald S. The Fighting Parson: The Biography of Colonel John M. Chivington. Los Angeles, California: Westernlore, 1959.
- Cresap, Bernarr. Appomattox Commander: The Story of E. O. C. Ord. San Diegeo, California: 1981. ISBN 0-498-02432-6.
- Cutler, Robert W. P. The Tin Box: Keepsakes of a Civil War General. Morris Publishing, 1999. ISBN 978-0-7392-0473-3.
- Davis, Oliver. Life of David Bell Birney, Major General, United States Volunteers. Philadelphia, Pennsylvania: King & Baird, 1867.
- de Meissner, Sophie Radford. Old Navy Days: Sketches from the Life of Rear-Admiral William Radford, USN. New York: Henry Hold and Co., 1920.
- Driscoll, John K. Rogue: A Biography of Civil War General Justus McKinstry. McFarland & Company, 2005. ISBN 978-0-7864-2385-9.
- Ecelbarger, Gary L. Frederick W. Lander: The Great Natural American Soldier. Louisiana State University Press, 2001. ISBN 0-8071-2580-6.
- Egan, Timothy. The Immortal Irishman: The Irish Revolutionary Who Became an American Hero. New York: Houghton Mifflin Harcourt, 2016. ISBN 978-0-544-27288-0.
- Eggleston, Michael A. President Lincoln's Recruiter: General Lorenzo Thomas and the United States Colored Troops in the Civil War. Jefferson, North Carolina: McFarland & Company, Inc., 2013. ISBN 978-0-7864-7217-8.
- Engle, Stephen D. Don Carlos Buell: Most Promising of All. Chapel Hill, North Carolina: University of North Carolina Press, 1999.
- Engle, Stephen D. The Yankee Dutchman: The Life of Franz Sigel. Fayetteville, Arkansas: University of Arkansas Press, 1993. ISBN 978-1-55728-273-6.
- Fanebust, Wayne. Major General Alexander M. McCook, USA: A Civil War Biography. Jefferson, North Carolina: McFarland and Company, 2012. ISBN 0-7864-7241-3.
- Finan, William J. Major General Alfred Howe Terry: Hero of Fort Fisher. Hartford, Connecticut: Connecticut Civil War Centennial Commission, 1965.
- Flemming, George T. Life and Letters of Alexander Hays. Pittsburgh, Pennsylvania: no publisher listed, 1919.
- Fordney, Ben Fuller. George Stoneman: A Biography of the Civil War General. Jefferson, North Carolina: McFarland & Co., 2008.
- Gambone, A. M. Major-General Darius Nash Couch: Enigmatic Valor. Butternut and Blue, 2000. ISBN 978-0-935523-75-1.
- Gambone, A. M. Major General John Federick Hartranft: Citizen Soldier and Pennsylvania Statesman (Army of the Potomac). Butternut and Blue, 1995. ISBN 978-0-935523-46-1.
- Gambone, A. M. "... if tomorrow night finds me dead ..." The Life of General Samuel K. Zook. Butternut and Blue, 1996. ISBN 978-0-935523-53-9.
- Gilman, Rhoda R. Henry Hastings Sibley: Divided Heart. St. Paul, Minnesota: Minnesota Historical Society Press, 2004. ISBN 978-0-87351-484-2.
- Grandchamp, Robert Colonel Edward E. Cross, New Hampshire Fighting Fifth: A Civil War Biography. Jefferson, North Carolina: McFarland & Company, Inc., 2013. ISBN 978-0-7864-7191-1.
- Harding, Jeffrey J. Gettysburg’s Lost Love Story: The Ill-Fated Romance of General John Reynolds and Kate Hewitt. The History Press, 2022. ISBN 9781467151597.
- Hearn, Chester G. Admiral David Dixon Porter: The Civil War Years. Annapolis, Maryland: Naval Institute Press, 1996. ISBN 1-55750-353-2.
- Hebert, Walter H. Fighting Joe Hooker. Old Soldier Books, 1987. ISBN 0-942211-94-4.
- Heyman, Max L. Prudent Soldier: A Biography of Major General Edward R. S. Canby. Glendale, California: Arthur H. Clark, 1959.
- Hogge, Jeffrey A. Norton Parker Chipman: A Biography of the Andersonville War Crimes Prosecutor. McFarland & Company, Inc., 2008. ISBN 978-0-7864-3449-7.
- Humphreys, Henry H. Andrew Atkinson Humphreys: A Biography. Philadelphia, Pennsylvania: John C. Winston Co., 1924. ISBN 0-943261-18-X.
- Hughes, Jr., Nathaniel Cheairs and Gordon D. Whitney. Jefferson Davis in Blue: The Life of Sherman's Relentless Warrior. Baton Rouge, Louisiana: Louisiana State University Press, 2002. ISBN 0-8071-2777-9.
- Hunt, Aurora. Major General James H. Carleton, 1814–1873: Western Frontier Dragoon. Glendale, California: Arthur H. Clark, 1958.
- Kastenberg, Joshua E. Law in War, War as Law: Brigadier General Joseph Holt and the Judge Advocate General's Department in the Civil War and Early Reconstruction, 1861–1865. Durham, North Carolina: Carolina Academic Press, 2011. ISBN 978-1-59460-864-3.
- Kautz, Lawrence G. August Valentine Kautz, USA: Biography of a Civil War General. Jefferson, North Carolina: McFarland & Co., 2008.
- Kearny, Thomas. General Philip Kearny: Battle Soldier of Five Wars. New York: G. P. Putnam's Sons, 1937.
- King, James T. War Eagle: A Life of General Eugene A. Carr. Lincoln, Nebraska: University of Nebraska press, 1963
- Kiper, Richard L. Major General John Alexander McClernand: Politician in Uniform. Kent, Ohio: Kent State University Press, 1999. ISBN 0-87338-636-1.
- Krumwiede, John F. Disgrace at Gettysburg: The Arrest and Court-Martial of Brigadier General Thomas A. Rowley, USA. Jefferson, North Carolina: McFarland & Company, Inc., 2006. ISBN 978-0-7864-2309-5.
- Ladenhaim, J.C. Grant's Keeper: The Life of John A. Rawlins. Holly Springs, North Carolina: Heritage Books, 2011. ISBN 978-0-7884-5333-5.
- Lash, Jeffrey N. A Politician Turned General: The Civil War Career of Stephen Augustus Hurlbut. Kent, Ohio: Kent State University Press, 2003. ISBN 0-87338-766-X.
- Lavery, Dennis S. & Mark H. Jordan. Iron Brigade General: John Gibbon, A Rebel in Blue. Westport, Connecticut: Greenwood Press, 1993. ISBN 0-313-28576-4.
- Lee, Dan. Kentuckian in Blue: A Biography of Major General Lovell Harrison Rousseau. McFarland & Company, 2010. ISBN 978-0-7864-4818-0.
- Lee, Dan. Thomas J. Wood: A Biography of the Union General in the Civil War. McFarland & Company, 2012. ISBN 978-0-7864-7130-0.
- Longacre, Edward G. From Union Stars to Top Hat: A Biography of the Extraordinary James Harrison Wilson. Harrisburg, Pennsylvania: Stackpole, 1972.
- Longacre, Edward G. The Man Behind the Guns: A Biography of General Henry J. Hunt, Commander of Artillery, Army of the Potomac. New York: A. S. Barnes and Co., Inc., 1977. ISBN 0-498-01656-0.
- Longacre, Edward G. Unsung Hero of Gettysburg: The Story of Union General David McMurtrie Gregg. Potomac Books, 2021. ISBN 978-1-64012-429-5.
- Lull, Robert W. Civil War General and Indian Fighter James M. Williams: Leader of the 1st Kansas Colored Volunteer Infantry and the 8th U.S. Cavalry. University of North Texas Press, 2013.
- Lyftogt, Kenneth L. Iowa's Forgotten General: Matthew Mark Trumbull and the Civil War. University of Iowa Press, 2007.
- Lyons, W. F. Brigadier–General Thomas Francis Meagher. New York: D. and J. Sadlier, 1870.
- Madsen, Brigham. Glory Hunter: A Biography of Patrick Edward Connor. Provo, Utah: University of Utah Press, 1990. ISBN 978-0-87480-336-5.
- Mahood, Wayne. Alexander "Fighting Elleck" Hays: The Life of a Civil War General, From West Point to the Wilderness. Jefferson, North Carolina: McFarland & Company, Inc., 2011. ISBN 0-7864-2213-0.
- Maharay, George S. Vermont Hero: Major General George J. Stannard. Ragged Edge Press, 2001. ISBN 978-1-57249-263-9.
- Marcot, Roy M. Civil War Sharpshooter: Hiram Berdan, Military Commander and Firearms Inventor. Irvine, California: Northwood Heritage Press, 1989.
- Martin, Jay C. General Henry Baxter, 7th Michigan Volunteer Infantry: A Biography. Jefferson, North Carolina: McFarland, 2015. ISBN 978-1-4766-6339-5.
- Martin, Samuel J. Kill–Cavalry: The Life of Union General Hugh Judson Kilpatrick. Mechanicsburg, Pennsylvania: Stackpole Books, 2000.
- Marvel, William. Burnside. The University of North Carolina Press, 1991. ISBN 978-0-8078-1983-8.
- Mason, Jack C. Until Antietam: The Life and Letters of Major General Israel B. Richardson, U.S. Army. Southern Illinois University Press, 2009. ISBN 978-0-8093-2947-2.
- Maull, D.W. The Life and Military Services of the Late Brigadier General Thomas A. Smyth. Wilmington, Delaware: H. & E. F. James, 1870.
- McConnell, William. Remember Reno: A Biography of Major General Jesse Lee Reno. Shippensburg, Pennsylvania: White Mane Publishing, 1996. ISBN 978-1-57249-020-8.
- McGaugh, Scott. Surgeon in Blue: Jonathan Letterman, The Civil War Doctor Who Pioneered Battlefield Care. New York: Arcade Publishing, 2013. ISBN 978-1-61145-839-8.
- Mesch, Allen H. Teacher of Civil War Generals: Major General Charles Ferguson Smith. McFarland & Company, 2015. ISBN 978-0-7864-9834-5.
- Meyers, Christopher C. Union General John A. McClernand and the Politics of Command. Jefferson, North Carolina: McFarland, 2010.
- Miller, David W. Second Only to Grant: Quartermaster General Montgomery C. Meigs. Shippensburg, Pennsylvania: White Mane, 2000.
- Miller, Jr., Edward A. Lincoln's Abolitionist General: The Biography of David Hunter. Columbia, South Carolina: University of South Carolina Press, 1997. ISBN 1-57003-110-X.
- Moneyhon, Carl H. Edmund J. Davis of Texas: Civil War General, Republican Leader, Reconstruction Governor. Fort Worth Texas: Texas Christian University Press, 2010.
- Morgan, Jack. Through American And Irish Wars: The Life And Times Of Thomas W. Sweeney 1820–1892. Irish Academic Press, 2006. ISBN 978-0-7165-3323-8.
- Morgans, James P. Grenville Mellen Dodge in the Civil War: Union Spymaster, Railroad Builder, and Organizer of the Fourth Iowa Volunteer Infantry. Jefferson, North Carolina: McFarland, 2016. ISBN 978-0786470693.
- Nash, May Eleanor. Colonel James A. Mulligan, Chicago's Hero of the Civil War. St. Louis, Missouri: Presented to the Faculty of the Graduate School of St. Louis University, 1929.
- Nevins, James H. and William B. Styple. What Death More Glorious: A Biography of General Strong Vincent. Kearny, New Jersey: Belle Grove Publishing Co., 1997.
- Nichols, Edward J. Toward Gettysburg: A Biography of General John F. Reynolds. University Park Pennsylvania: Pennsylvania State University Press, 1958.
- Norris, L. David, James C. Milligan, and Odie B. Faulk. William H. Emory: Soldier–Scientist. Tucson, Arizona: University of Arizona Press, 1998.
- Noyalas, Jonathan A. "My Will Is Absolute Law": A Biography of Union General Robert H. Milroy. Jefferson, North Carolina: McFarland & Company, Inc., 2006. ISBN 978-0-7864-2508-2.
- O'Harrow, Jr., Robert. The Quartermaster: Montgomery C. Meigs, Lincoln's General, Master Builder of the Union Army. New York: Simon & Schuster, 2016. ISBN 978-1-4516-7192-6.
- Olson, Gordon L. The Notorious Isaac Earl and His Scouts: Union Soldiers, Prisoners, Spies. Grand Rapids, MI: William B. Eerdmans Publishing Co., 2014. ISBN 978-0-8028-6801-5.
- Palmer, George Thomas and Lloyd Lewis. A Conscientious Turncoat: The Story of John M. Palmer 1817–1900. Yale University Pre3ss, 1900.
- Parker, Arthur C. The Life of General Ely S. Parker: Last Grand Sachem of the Iroquois and General Grant's Military Secretary. Buffalo, New York: Buffalo Historical Society, 1919. ISBN 1-889246-50-6.
- Phillips, Christopher. Damned Yankee: The Life of General Nathaniel Lyon. University of Missouri Press, 1990. ISBN 978-0-8262-0731-9.
- Pula, James S. For Liberty and Justice: A Biography of Brigadier General Wlodzimierz B. Krzyzanowski, 1824–1887. Syracuse University Press, 2009. ISBN 0-9660363-9-5.
- Quatman, G. William. Young General and the Fall of Richmond: The Life and Career of Godfrey Weitzel. Ohio University Press, 2015. ISBN 978-0-8214-2141-3.
- Ross, Sam. The Empty Sleeve: A Biography of Lucius Fairchild. Madison, Wisconsin: The State Historical Society of Wisconsin, 1964. LCCN 64-63013.
- Sauers, Richard A. William Francis Bartlett: Biography of a Union General in the Civil War. Jefferson, North Carolina: McFarland Publishers, 2009.
- Schlicke, Carl P. General George Wright: Guardian of the Pacific Coast, 1803–1865. Norman, Oklahoma: University of Oklahoma Press, 1998.
- Schmiel, Eugene D. Citizen-General: Jacob Dolson Cox and the Civil War Era. Ohio University Press, 2014. ISBN 978-0-8214-2082-9.
- Scott, Robert G. Forgotten Valor: The Memoirs, Journals, & Civil War Letters of Orlando B. Willcox. Kent State University Press, 1999.
- Shea, William L. Union General: Samuel Ryan Curtis and Victory in the West. Potomac Books, 2023. ISBN 978-1-64012-518-6.
- Smith, Ronald D. Thomas Ewing, Jr.: Frontier Lawyer and Civil War General. Columbia, Missouri: University of Missouri Press, 2008.
- Snell, Mark A. From First to Last: The Life of Major General William B. Franklin. New York: Fordham University Press, 2002. ISBN 978-0-8232-2148-6.
- Stevens, Hazard. The Life of Isaac Ingalls Stevens, two volumes. Boston, Massachusetts: Houghton Mifflin & Co., 1900.
- Sully, Langdon. No Tears for the General: The Life of Alfred Sully, 1821–1879. Palo Alto, California: American West Publishing Co., 1974. ISBN 978-0-910118-33-0.
- Taylor, Paul. Orlando M. Poe: Civil War General and Great Lakes Engineer. Kent, Ohio: Kent State University Press, 2009.
- Thompson, Jerry D. Civil War to the Bloody End: The Life and Times of Major General Samuel P. Heintzelman. College Station, Texas: Texas A&M University Press, 2006.
- Thompson, Jerry D. Desert Tiger: Captain Paddy Graydon and the Civil War in the Far Southwest. El Paso, Texas: Texas Western Press, 1992.
- Thompson, Jerry D. and Thomas Smith. The Reminiscences of Major General Zenas R. Bliss, 1854–1876: From the Texas Frontier to the Civil War and Back Again. Texas State Historical Association, 2008. ISBN 978-0-87611-226-7.
- Townsend, May Bobbitt. Yankee Warhorse: A Biography of Major General Peter Osterhaus. Columbia, Missouri: University of Missouri Press, 2010. ISBN 978-0-8262-1875-9.
- Townsend, George Alfred. Major General Alfred Thomas Archimedes Torbert: Delaware's most famous Civil War hero. Heritage Books, 1993. ISBN 978-1-55613-699-3.
- Trefousse, Hans Louis. Carl Schurz: A Biography. Fordham University Press, 1998.
- Varley, James F. Brigham and the Brigadier: General Patrick Connor and His California Volunteers in Utah and along the Overland Trail. Tucson, Arizona: Westernlore Press, 1989.
- Wallace, Isabel. Life of General W. H. L. Wallace. Chicago, Illinois: R. R. Donnelley and Sons, 1909.
- Ward, James A. That Man Haupt: A Biography of Herman Haupt. Baton Rouge, Louisiana: Louisiana State University Press, 1973.
- Weddle, Kevin J. Lincoln's Tragic Admiral: The Life of Samuel Francis Du Pont. Charlottesville, Virginia: University of Virginia Press, 2005.
- Welch, Richard F. The Boy General: The Life and Careers of Francis Channing Barlow. Cranbury, New Jersey: Associated University Press, 2003.
- Welles, Gideon and Spencer, J. Ronald (Editor). A Connecticut Yankee in Lincoln's Cabinet: Navy Secretary Gideon Welles Chronicles the Civil War. Acorn, 2014. ISBN 978-0-615-96103-3.
- Werstein, Irving. Kearny the Magnificent: The Story of General Philip Kearny 1815–1862. New York: John Day, 1962. LCCN 62-10957.
- West, Richard S. The Second Admiral: A Life of David Dixon Porter. New York: Coward–McCann, 1937.
- Whaley, Elizabeth J. Forgotten Hero: General James B. McPherson: The Biography of a Civil War General. New York, NY: Exposition Press, 1955. LCCN 54-11323.
- Willcox, Orlando Bolivar and Scott, Robert G (Editor). Forgotten Valor: The Memoirs, Journals, & Civil War Letters of Orlando B. Willcox. Kent State University Press, 1999. ISBN 978-0-87338-628-9.
- Williams, Alpheus S. From the Cannon's Mouth: The Civil War Letters of General Alpheus S. Williams. Wayne State University Press, 1959.
- Wilson, James Harrison. The Life and Services of Brevet Brigadier General Andrew Jonathan Alexander, United States Army. New York: no publisher listed, 1887.
- Wilson, James Harrison. The Life of John A. Rawlins. New York: The Neale Publishing Company, 1916.
- Wilson, James Harrison. Life and Services of William Farrar Smith, Major General United States Volunteers in the Civil War. Wilmington, Delaware: John M. Rogers Press, 1904.
- Winslow, III., Richard Elliott. General John Sedwick: The Story of a Union Corps Commander. Novato, California: Presidio Press, 1982.
- Wylie, Paul R. The Irish General: Thomas Francis Meagher. Norman, Oklahoma: University of Oklahoma press, 2011. ISBN 978-0-8061-4185-5.
- Young, Kenneth Ray. The General's General: The Life and Times of Arthur MacArthur. Boulder, Colorado: Westview Press, 1994. ISBN 0-8133-2195-6.
- Zobell, Albert L. Jr. Sentinel in the East: A Biography of Thomas L. Kane. Salt Lake City, UT: Utah Printing Company, 1965.

==== Nathaniel Prentiss Banks ====
- Harrington, Fred Harvey. Fighting Politician, Major General N. P. Banks. University of Pennsylvania Press, 1948. ISBN 978-0-8371-3007-1.
- Hollandsworth, Jr., James G. Pretense of Glory: The Life of General Nathaniel P. Banks. Louisiana State University Press, 1998. ISBN 978-0-8071-2293-8.

==== John Buford ====
- Longacre, Edward G. General John Buford: A Military Biography. Conshohocken, Pennsylvania: Combined Books, 1995. ISBN 0-938289-46-2.
- Phipps, Michael and John S. Peterson. The Devil's to Pay: Gen. John Buford, USA. Gettysburg, Pennsylvania: Farnsworth, Military Impressions, 1995.

==== Benjamin F. Butler ====
- Hearn, Chester G. When the devil came down to Dixie: Ben Butler in New Orleans. Louisiana State University Press, 1997. ISBN 0-8071-2180-0.
- Holzman, Robert S. Stormy Ben Butler. New York: Macmillan, 1954.
- Nash, Jr., Howard P. Stormy Petrel: The Life and Times of General Benjamin F. Butler, 1818–1893. Rutherford, New Jersey: Fairleigh Dickinson University Press, 1969.
- Nolan, Dick. Benjamin Franklin Butler: The Damnedest Yankee. Novato, California: Presidio Press.
- Trefousse, Hans Louis. Ben Butler: The South Called Him Beast!. New York: Twayne Publishers, 1957.
- Werlich, Robert. "Beast" Butler: The Incredible Career of Major General Benjamin Butler. Quaker Press, 1962.
- West, Richard S. Jr. Lincoln's Scapegoat General: The Life of Benjamin F. Butler, 1818–1893. Houghton Mifflin, 1965.

==== Joshua Lawrence Chamberlain ====
- Chamberlain, Joshua Lawrence. Bayonet! Forward: My Civil War Reminiscences. Stan Clark Military Books, 2003. ISBN 978-1-879664-21-0.
- Golay, Michael. To Gettysburg and Beyond: The Parallel Lives of Joshua Lawrence Chamberlain and Edward Porter Alexander. New York: Crown Publishers, 1995.
- Longacre, Edward G. Joshua Chamberlain: The Soldier and the Man. Combined Publishing, 1999. ISBN 978-1-58097-021-1.
- Pullen, John J. Joshua Chamberlain: A Hero's Life and Legacy. Stackpole Books, 1999. ISBN 978-0-8117-0886-9.
- Trulock, Alice Rains. In the Hands of Providence: Joshua L. Chamberlain and the American Civil War. The University of North Carolina Press, 1992. ISBN 978-0-8078-2020-9.
- Wallace, Willard M. Soul of the Lion: A Biography of General Joshua L. Chamberlain. Butternut & Blue, 1991. ISBN 978-1-879664-00-5.

==== William B. Cushing ====
- Brown, Kent Masterson. Cushing of Gettysburg: The Story of a Union Artillery Commander. Lexington, Kentucky: University Press of Kentucky, 1993. ISBN 9780813109534.
- Edwards, E. M. H. Commander William Barker Cushing of the United States Navy. New York: F. Tennyson Neely, 1898.
- Malanowski, Jamie. Commander Will Cushing: Daredevil Hero of the Civil War. New York: W.W. Norton & Company, 2014. ISBN 978-0-393-24089-4.
- Roske, Raplh and Charles Van Doren. Lincoln's Commando: The Biography of Commander William. B. Cushing, USN. New York: Harper & Brothers, 1957. ISBN 1-55750-737-6.

==== George Armstrong Custer ====
- Barnett, Louise. Touched by Fire: The Life, Death, and Mythic Afterlife of George Armstrong Custer. Henry Holt & Co, 1996. ISBN 978-0-8050-3720-3.
- Monaghan, Jay. Custer: The Life of George Armstrong Custer. Lincoln, Nebraska: University of Nebraska Press, 1959.
- Philbrick, Nathaniel. The Last Stand: Custer, Sitting Bull, and the Battle of the Little Big Horn. Viking Adult, 2010. ISBN 978-0-670-02172-7.
- Urwin, Gregory J. W. Custer Victorious: The Civil War Battles of General George Armstrong Custer. East Brunswick, New Jersey: Associated University Presses, 1983.
- Wert, Jeffry D. Custer: The Controversial Life of George Armstrong Custer. New York: Simon & Schuster, 1996.
- Whittaker, Frederick. A Complete Life of General George A. Custer. New York: Sheldon, 1876.

==== Grenville M. Dodge ====
- Hirshon, Stanley P. Greenville M. Dodge: Soldier, Politician, Railroad Pioneer. Bloomington, Indiana: 1967.
- Perkins, J. R. Trails, Rails and War: The Life of General G. M. Dodge. Indianapolis, Indiana: The Bobbs-Merrill Company, 1929. ISBN 978-0-405-13810-2.

==== David Glasgow Farragut ====
- Duffy, James P. Lincoln's Admiral: The Civil War Campaigns of David Farragut. Hoboken, NJ: John Wiley & Sons, Inc., 1997. ISBN 0-471-04208-0.
- Farragut, Loyall. The Life of David Glasgow Farragut, First Admiral of the United States Navy, Embodying His Journals and Letters. New York: D. Appleton, 1879.
- Hearn, Chester G. Admiral David Glasgow Farragut: The Civil War Years. US Naval Institute Press, 1997. ISBN 978-1-55750-384-8.
- Lewis, Charles Lee. David Glasgow Farragut Admiral in the Making. Naval Institute Press, 1941.
- Martin, Christopher. Damn the torpedoes!: The story of America's first admiral: David Glasgow Farragut. Abelard-Schuman, 1970.
- Schneller, Jr., Robert J. Farragut: America's First Admiral. Washington, D.C.: Brassey's Inc., 2002. ISBN 1-57448-398-6.

==== Andrew Hull Foote ====
- Hoppin, J. Life of Andrew Hull Foote, Rear–Admiral, United States Navy. New York: Harper and Brothers, Publishers, 1874.
- Tucker, Spencer C. Andrew Foote: Civil War Admiral on Western Waters. Annapolis, Maryland: Naval Institute Press, 2000. ISBN 978-1-55750-820-1.

==== Ulysses S. Grant ====
- Ballard, Michael B. U.S. Grant: The Making of a General, 1861–1863. Rowman & Littlefield, Publishers, 2005. ISBN 0-7425-4308-0.
- Bedeau, Adam. Military History of Ulysseus S. Grant, from April, 1861, to April, 1865. New York: D. Appleton and Company, 1881.
- Bonekemper III, Edward H. A Victor, Not a Butcher: Ulysses S. Grant's Overlooked Military Genius. Washington, D.C.: Regnery Publishing, 2004.
- Brands, H.W. The Man Who Saved the Union: Ulysses S. Grant in War and Peace. New York: Doubleday, 2012.
- Bunting III, Josiah. Ulysses S. Grant. New York: Times Books, 2004.
- Bunting III, Josiah. Ulysses S. Grant (2004) ISBN 0-8050-6949-6.
- Catton, Bruce. Grant Moves South. Boston: Little, Brown & Co., 1960. ISBN 0-316-13207-1.
- Catton, Bruce. Grant Takes Command. Boston: Little, Brown & Co., 1968. ISBN 0-316-13210-1.
- Catton, Bruce. U. S. Grant and the American Military Tradition (1954)
- Chernow, Ron. Grant. Penguin Press, 2017. ISBN 978-1594204876
- Conger, A. L. The Rise of U.S. Grant. New York: Century Press, 1931.
- Davis, William C. Crucible of Command: Ulysses S. Grant and Robert E. Lee - The War They Fought, The Peace They Forged. Boston, Massachusetts: Da Capo Press, 2014. ISBN 978-0-306-82245-2.
- Ellington, Charles B. The Trial of U.S. Grant: The Pacific Coast Years, 1852–1854. Glendale, California: Arthur H. Clark, 1986.
- Farina, William. Ulysses S. Grant, 1861–1864: His Rise from Obscurity to Military Greatness. Jefferson, North Carolina: McFarland & Company, Inc., 2007. ISBN 978-0-7864-2977-6.
- Flood, Charles Bracelen. Grant and Sherman: The Friendship That Won the Civil War. New York: Farrar, Staus and Giroux, 2005.
- Fuller, Maj. Gen. J. F. C., Grant and Lee, A Study in Personality and Generalship, Indiana University Press, 1957.
- Headley, P.C. The Life and Campaigns of Lieut.-Gen. U.S. Grant. New York: Derby and Miller, 1866.
- Kelsey, Marie Ellen, compiler. Ulysses S. Grant: A Bibliography. Westport, Connecticut: Praeger, 2005.
- King, Charles. The True Ulysses S. Grant. Philadelphia, Pennsylvania: J.B. Lippincott, 1914.
- Korda, Michael. Ulysses S. Grant. New York: Harper Collins Publishers, 2004.
- Lewis, Lloyd. Captain Sam Grant. Boston: Little, Brown, and Co., 1950. ISBN 0-316-52348-8.
- Longacre, Edward G. General Ulysses S. Grant: The Soldier and the Man. New York: Da Capo Press, 2006.
- McFeely, William S. Grant: A Biography. New York: W.W. Norton, 1981.
- Murphy, Brian J. Ulysses S. Grant. Dulles, Virginia: Brassey's Publishing, 2004.
- Richardson, Albert D. A Personal History of Ulysses S. Grant. Hartford, Connecticut: American Publishing, 1868.
- Perret, Geoffrey. Ulysses S. Grant: Soldier & President. New York: Random House, 1998.
- Sarna, Jonathan D. When General GrantExpelled the Jews. New York: Schocken Books, 2012.
- Simpson, Brooks D. Ulysses S. Grant: Triumph over Adversity, 1822–1865. New York: Houghton Mifflin, 2000.
- Smith, Jean Edward. Grant. New York: Simon & Schuster, 2001. ISBN 978-0-606-32555-4.
- Waugh, Joan. U.S. Grant: American Hero, American Myth. Chapel Hill, North Carolina: University of North Carolina Press, 2010.
- Woodward, W.E. Meet General Grant. New York: Literary Guild of America, 1928.

==== Henry W. Halleck ====
- Ambrose, Stephen. Halleck: Lincoln's Chief of Staff. Baton Rouge, LA: Louisiana State University Press, 1999. ISBN 978-0-8071-2071-2. Originally published 1962.
- Anders, Curt. Henry Halleck's War: A Fresh Look at Lincoln's Controversial General–in–chief. Carmel, Indiana: Guild Press of Indiana, 1999.
- Marszalek, John F. Commander of All Lincoln's Armies: A Life of General Henry W. Halleck. Harvard University Press, 2004.

==== Winfield Scott Hancock ====
- Jordan, David M. Winfield Scott Hancock: A Soldier's Life. Bloomington, Indiana: Indiana University Press, 1988.
- Tucker, Glenn. Hancock the Superb. New York: Bobbs–Merrill Company, 1960.
- Walker, Francis A. General Hancock. New York: D. Appleton, 1894.

==== William S. Harney ====
- Adams, George R. General William S. Harney: Prince of Dragoons. University of Nebraska Press, 2001. ISBN 0-8032-1058-2.
- Archer, Jules. Indian Foe, Indian Friend: The Story of William S. Harney. Crowell Collier, 1970.

==== Oliver O. Howard ====
- Carpenter, John A. Sword and Olive Branch: Oliver Otis Howard. Fordham University Press, 1999. ISBN 978-0-8232-1987-2.
- McFeely, William S. Yankee Stepfather: General O.O. Howard and the Freedmen. Yale University Press, 1968.
- Weland, Gerald. O.O. Howard, Union General. Jefferson, North Carolina: McFarland & Company Inc, 1995. ISBN 978-0-7864-0133-8.
- Weil, Gordon L. The Good Man: The Civil War's "Christian General" and His Fight for Racial Equality. Arthur McAllister Publishers, 2013. ISBN 978-1-935496-06-9.

==== John A. Logan ====
- Dawson, George Francis. Life and Services of General John A. Logan as Soldier and Statesman. Washington, D.C.: The National Tribune, 1884.
- Jones, James Pickett. Black Jack: John A. Logan and Southern Illinois in the Civil War Era. Southern Illinois University Press, 1995. ISBN 0-8093-2001-0.

==== Ranald S. Mackenzie ====
- Pierce, Michael Dale. The Most Promising Young Officer: A Life of Ranald Slidell MacKenzie. Norman, Oklahoma: University of Oklahoma Press, 1993.
- Robinson, Charles M. Bad Hand: A Biography of General Ranald S. Mackenzie. Austin, Texas: State House Press, 1993. ISBN 1-880510-00-6.

==== George B. McClellan ====
- Bonekemper, III, Edward H. McClellan and Failure: A Study of Civil War Fear, Incompetence and Worse. Jefferson, North Carolina: McFarland & Company, Inc., 2010. ISBN 978-0-7864-4575-2.
- Hassler, Jr., Warren W. General George B. McClellan: Shield of the Union. Baton Rouge, Louisiana: Louisiana State University Press, 1957.
- Macartney, Clarence E. Little Mac: The Life of George B. McClellan. Philadelphia, Pennsylvania: Dorrance, 1940.
- Myers, William Starr. General George B. McClellan: A Study in Personality. New York: D. Appleton–Century, 1934.
- Rafuse, Ethan S. McClellan's War: The Failure of Moderation in the Struggle for the Union. Indiana University Press, 2005.
- Sears, Stephen W. George B. McClellan: The Young Napoleon. Ticknor & Fields, 1988. ISBN 978-0-89919-264-2.

==== George G. Meade ====
- Cleaves, Freeman. Meade of Gettysburg. Norman, Oklahoma: University of Oklahoma Press, 1960.
- Huntington, Tom. Searching for George Gordon Meade: The Forgotten Victory of Gettysburg. Mechanicsburg, PA: Stackpole Books, 2013. ISBN 978-0-8117-0813-5.
- Meade, Richard Bache. Life of George Gordon Meade Commander of the Army of the Potomac. Philadelphia, Pennsylvania: Henry T. Coates & Co., 1897.
- Pennypacker, Isaac R. General Meade. New York: D. Appleton, 1901.
- Rafuse, Ethan S. George Gordon Meade and the War in the East. Abilene, Texas: McWhitney Foundation Press, 2003.
- Sauers, Richard A. Meade: Victor of Gettysburg. Potomac Books, 2004. ISBN 978-1-57488-749-5.

==== Nelson A. Miles ====
- Amchan, Arthur J. Most Famous Soldier in America: A Biography of Lt Gen Nelson a Miles 1839–1925. Amchan Pubns, 1990. ISBN 978-0-9617132-1-8.
- Demontravel, Peter R. A Hero to His Fighting Men: Nelson A. Miles, 1839–1925. Kent State Univ Press, 1998. ISBN 978-0-87338-594-7.
- Johnson, Virginia Weisel. The Unregimented General: A Biography of Nelson A. Miles. Houghton Mifflin, 1962. ISBN 978-1-121-59045-8.
- Miles, Nelson A and Brian C. Pohanka. Nelson A. Miles: A Documentary Biography of His Military Career, 1861–1903. Arthur H Clark, 1986. ISBN 978-0-87062-159-8.
- Wooster, Robert. Nelson A. Miles and the Twilight of the Frontier Army. University of Nebraska Press, 1993. ISBN 978-0-8032-4759-8.

==== John Pope ====
- Cozzens, Peter. General John Pope: A Life for the Nation. Urbana, Illinois: University of Illinois Press, 2000. ISBN 978-0-252-02363-7.
- Pope, John; Peter Cozzens (Editor) and Robert I. Girardi (Editor). The Military Memoirs of General John Pope. The University of North Carolina Press, 1998. ISBN 978-0-8078-2444-3.
- Schutz, Wallace J. and Walter N. Trenerry. Abandoned by Lincoln: A Military Biography of John Pope. Chicago, Illinois: University of Illinois Press, 1990.

==== Fitz–John Porter ====
- Anders, Curt. Injustice on Trial: Second Bull Run, General Fitz John Porter's Court-Martial, and the Schofield Board Investigation That Restored His Good Name. Zionsville, Indiana: Guild Press Emmis Publishing, 2002. ISBN 1-57860-110-X.
- Jermann, Donald R. Fitz–John Porter, Scrapegoat of Second Manassas.

==== William Starke Rosecrans ====
- Lamers, William M. The Edge of Glory: A Biography of William S. Rosecrans, U.S.A. Washington, D.C.: U.S. Government Printing Office, 1955. ISBN 0-8071-2396-X.
- Moore, David. William S. Rosecrans and the Union Victory: A Civil War Biography. McFarland & Company, Inc., 2014. ISBN 978-0-7864-7624-4.
- Mulhane, L.W. Major General William Stark Rosecrans: Hero of Iuka, Corinth and Stone River, and Father of the Army of the Cumberland. no publisher listed, 1908.

==== John M. Schofield ====
- Connelly, Donald B. John M. Schofield and the Politics of Generalship. Chapel Hill, North Carolina: University of North Carolina Press, 2006
- McDonough, James Lee. Schofield: Union General in the Civil War and Reconstruction. Tallahassee, Florida: Florida State University Press, 1972.
- Schofield, John McAllister. Forty-Six Years in The Army. The Century Co., 1897.

==== Winfield Scott ====
- Eisenhower, John S. D. Agent of Destiny: The Life and Times of General Winfield Scott. New York: Free Press, 1997. ISBN 978-0-684-84451-0.
- Elliott, Charles W. Winfield Scott, the Soldier and the Man. New York: The Macmillan Company, 1937.
- Johnson, Timothy D. Winfield Scott: The Quest for Military Glory. University Press of Kansas, 1998.
- Peskin, Allan. Winfield Scott and the Profession of Arms. Kent, Ohio: Kent State University Press, 2004.
- Smith, Arthur Douglas Howden. Old Fuss and Feathers: The Life and Exploits of Lieutenant General Winfield Scott. 2012.

==== Philip H. Sheridan ====
- Drake, William F. Little Phil: The Story of General Philip Henry Sheridan. Prospect, Connecticut: Biographical Press, 2005.
- Greiner, Henry C. General Phil Sheridan As I Knew Him, Playmate–Comrade–Friend. Chicago, Illinois: 1908.
- Hutton, Dr. Paul Andrew, Ph.D. Phil Sheridan and His Army. University of Nebraska Press, 1985.
- Morris, Roy Jr. Sheridan: The Life and Wars of General Phil Sheridan. Crown, 1992.
- O'Connor, Richard. Sheridan the Inevitable. New York: 1953.
- Stackpole, Edward J. Sheridan in the Shenandoah: Jubal Early's Nemesis. Harrisburg, Pennsylvania: Stackpole Books, 1961.
- Wheelan, Joseph. Terrible Swift Sword: The Life of General Philip H. Sheridan. Da Capo Press, 2012.
- Wittenber, Eric J. Little Phil: A Reassessment of the Civil War Leadership of Gen. Philip H. Sheridan. Washington, D.C.: Brassey's, 2002.

==== William Tecumseh Sherman ====
- Bailey, Anne J. War and Ruin: William T. Sherman and the Savannah Campaign. Wilmington, Delaware: SR Books, 2003.
- Boyd, James P. The Life of General William T. Sherman. Publisher's Union, 1891.
- Bowman, Samuel Millard. Sherman and His Campaigns. New York: C.B. Richardson, 1868.
- Bowman, S.M. and R.B. Irwin. Sherman and His Campaigns: A Military Biography. New York: Charles P. Richardson, 1865.
- Eisenhower, John S. D. American General: The Life and Times of William Tecumseh Sherman. NAL Hardcover, 2014.
- Fellman, Michael. Citizen Sherman; A Life of William Tecumseh Sherman. New York: Random House, 1995.
- Flood, Charles Bracelen. Grant and Sherman: The Friendship That Won the Civil War. New York: Farrar, Staus and Giroux, 2005.
- Hart, B. H. Liddell. Sherman: Soldier, Realist, American. Greenwood Press Reprint, 1978.
- Hirshon, Stanley P. The White Tecumseh: A Biography of General William T. Sherman. New York: John Wiley & Sons, Inc., 1997. ISBN 0-471-17578-1.
- Kennett, Lee. Sherman: A Soldier's Life. New York: Harper Collins, 2001.
- Kent, Zachary. William Tecumseh Sherman: Union General. Enslow Publishers, 2002.
- Lewis, Lloyd. Sherman: Fighting Prophet. New York: Harcourt, Brace and Company, 1958.
- Marszalek, John F. Sherman: A Soldier's Passion for Order. New York: Free Press, 1993.
- McDonough, James Lee. William Tecumseh Sherman: In the Service of My Country: A Life. New York: W.W. Norton & Company, 2016. ISBN 978-0-393-24157-0.
- Merrill, James M. William Tecumseh Sherman. New York: Rand McNally & Company, 1971.
- Miers, Earl Schenck. The General Who March to Hell. New York: Dorset, 1990.
- O'Connell, Robert L. Fierce Patriot: The Tangled Lives of William Tecumseh Sherman. New York: Random House, 2014. ISBN 978-1-4000-6972-9.
- Woodworth, Steven E. Sherman: Lessons in Leadership. Palgrave Macmillan Trade, 2009.

==== James Shields ====
- Callan, J. P. Sean. Courage and Country: James Shields, More Than Irish Luck. Libertyville, Illinois: IrishQuill Publishing, 2004.
- Condon, William H. Life of Major General James Shields. Chicago, Illinois: Press of the Blakely Printing Co., 1900.
- Purcell, Joseph R. James Shields: Soldier and Statesman. Dublin, 1932.

==== Daniel E. Sickles ====
- Hessler, James A. Sickles at Gettysburg: The Controversial Civil War General Who Committed Murder, Abandoned Little Round Top, and Declared Himself the Hero of Gettysburg. Savas Beatie, 2009.
- Keneally, Thomas. American Scoundrel: The Life of the Notorious Civil War General Dan Sickles. New York: Nan A. Talese/Doubleday, 2002. ISBN 978-1-74051-083-7.
- Swanburg, W. A. Sickles the Incredible. New York: Scribner's, 1956. ISBN 1-879664-02-X.

==== Henry W. Slocum ====
- Melton, Brian C. Sherman's Forgotten General: Henry W. Slocum. University of Missouri, 2007.
- Slocum, Charles Elihu. The Life and Services of Major-General Henry Warner Slocum. Forgotten Books, 2012.

==== Edwin V. Sumner ====
- Stanley, F. E. V. Sumner, Major General United States Army (1797–1863). published by author, 1968.
- Tate, Thomas K. General Edwin Vose Sumner, USA: A Civil War Biography. McFarland & Company, 2013.

==== George H. Thomas ====
- Bobrick, Benson. Master of War: The Life of General George H. Thomas. New York: Simon & Schuster, 2009. ISBN 978-0-7432-9025-8.
- Broadwater, Robert P. General George H. Thomas: A Biography of the Union's "Rock of Chickamauga". Jefferson, North Carolina: McFarland & Company, Inc., 2009. ISBN 978-0-7864-3856-3.
- Cleaves, Freeman. Rock of Chickamauga: The Life of General George H. Thomas. Norman, Oklahoma: University of Oklahoma Press, 1946. ISBN 978-0-8371-6973-6.
- Einolf, Christopher. George Thomas: Virginian for the Union. Norman, Oklahoma: University of Oklahoma Press, 2007. ISBN 978-0-8061-3867-1.
- McKinney, Francis. Education in Violence: The Life of George H. Thomas and the History of the Army of the Cumberland. Detroit, Michigan: Wayne State University Press, 1961.
- O'Conner, Richard. Thomas: Rock of Chickamauga. New York: Prentice–Hall, 1948.
- Palumbo, Frank A. George Henry Thomas the Dependable General: The Dependable General Supreme in Tactics of Strategy and Command. Morningside Bookshop, 1983. ISBN 978-0-89029-311-9.
- Piatt, Don. General George H. Thomas: A Critical Biography. Cincinnati: Robert Clarke, 1893.
- Thomas, Wilbur. General George H. Thomas: The Indomitable Warrior. New York: Exposition Press, 1964.
- Van Horne, Thomas B. The Life of Major General George H. Thomas. New York: Charles Scribner's Sons, 1882.
- Wills, Brian Steel. George Henry Thomas: As True As Steel. Lawrence, Kansas: University Press of Kansas, 2012. ISBN 978-0-7006-1841-5.

==== James S. Wadsworth ====
- Mahood, Wayne. General Wadsworth: The Life and Times of Brevet Major General James S. Wadsworth. Cambridge, Massachusetts: Da Capo Press, 2003. ISBN 0-306-81238-X.
- Pearson, Henry Greenleaf. James S. Wadsworth of Geneseo, Brevet Major-General of United States Volunteers. New York: Charles Scribner's Sons, 1913.

==== Lew Wallace ====
- Boomhower, Ray E. The Sword & the Pen: a Life of Lew Wallace. Indiana Historical Society, 2005.
- Getchell, Kevin. Scapegoat of Shiloh: The Distortion of Lew Wallace's Record by U.S. Grant. Jefferson, North Carolina: McFarland & Company, Inc., 2013. ISBN 978-0-7864-7209-3.
- Leeke, Jim and Lew Wallace. Smoke, Sound and Fury: the Civil War Memoirs of Major-general Lew Wallace, U. S. Volunteers. Strawberry Hill Press, 1998. ISBN 978-0-89407-124-9.
- McKee, Irving. "Ben–Hur" Wallace: the Life of General Lew Wallace. Berkeley, California: University of California Press, 1947.
- Morsberger, Robert Eustis and Katharine M. Morsberger. Lew Wallace, Militant Romantic. San Francisco Book Co., 1980. ISBN 978-0-07-043305-2.
- Stephens, Gail. Shadow of Shiloh: Major General Lew Wallace in the Civil War. Indianapolis, Indiana: Indiana Historical Society Press, 2011. ISBN 978-0-87195-287-5.

==== Gouverneur K. Warren ====
- Jordon, David M. "Happiness Is Not My Companion": The Life of General G.K. Warren. Bloomington, Indiana: Indiana University Press, 2001. ISBN 0-253-33904-9.
- Taylor, Emerson Gifford. Gouverneur Kemble Warren: The Life and Letters of an American Soldier, 1830–1882. Boston, Massachusetts: Houghton Mifflin, 1932.
- Walker, Paula and Robert Girardi. The Soldiers' General: Major General Gouverneur K. Warren and the Civil War. Savas Beatie, 2015. ISBN 978-1-61121-206-8.

== Confederate military leaders ==
=== General references ===
- American National Biography 24 vol (1999), essays by scholars on all major figures; online and hardcover editions at many libraries
- Allardice, Bruce S. Confederate Colonels: A Biographical Register. Columbia, Missouri: University of Missouri Press, 2008.
- Allardice, Bruce S. More Generals in Gray: A Companion Volume to Generals in Gray. Baton Rouge, Louisiana: Louisiana State University Press, 1995. ISBN 0-8071-1967-9.
- Allardice, Bruce S. and Lawrence Lee Hewitt, editors. Kentuckians in Gray: Confederate Generals and Field Officers of the Bluegrass State. Lexington, Kentucky: University Press of Kentucky, 2008. ISBN 9780813124759.
- Barefoot, Daniel W. Let Us Die Like Brave Men: Behind the Dying Words of Confederate Warriors. Winston-Salem, North Carolina: Blair, 2005.
- Current, Richard N., et al. eds. Encyclopedia of the Confederacy, four volumes. New York: Simon & Schuster, 1993.
- Davis, William C., ed. The Confederate General, six volumes. New York: National Historical Society, 1991–92.
- Gallagher, Gary W. and Joseph T. Glatthaar, editors. Leaders of the Lost Cause: New Perspectives on the Confederate High Command. Mechanicsburg, Pennsylvania: Stackpole Books, 2004. ISBN 0-8117-0087-9.
- Hewitt, Lawrence Lee and Arthur W. Bergeron, Jr. Confederate Generals in the Western Theater, Volume 2: Essays on America's Civil War. Knoxville, Tennessee: University of Tennessee Press, 2010. ISBN 978-1-57233-699-5.
- Johnson, John Lipscomb. The University Memorial: Biographical Sketches of Alumni of the University of Virginia Who Fell in the Confederate War. Baltimore, Maryland: Turnbull Brothers, 1871.
- Jones, Virgil Carrington. Gray Ghosts and Rebel Raiders. New York, New York: First Promontory Press, 1995. ISBN 0-88394-092-2.
- Krick, Robert E. L. Staff Officers in Gray: A Biographical Register of the Staff Officers in the Army of Northern Virginia. Chapel Hill, North Carolina: University of North Carolina Press, 2003.
- Krick, Robert K. Lee's Colonels. Dayton, Ohio: Morningside House, 1991.
- Longacre, Edward G. Lee's Cavalrymen: A History of the Mounted Forces of the Army of Northern Virginia. Mechanicsburg, Pennsylvania: Stackpole Books, 2002. ISBN 0-8117-0898-5.
- Owen, Richard and James Owen. Generals at Rest: The Grave Sites of the 425 Official Confederate Generals. Shippensburg, Pennsylvania: White Mane Publishing Company, Inc., 1997.
- Snow, Captain William P. Lee and His Generals. New York, New York: The Fairfax Press, 1982. ISBN 0-517-38109-5.
- Trout, Robert J. Galloping Thunder: The Stuart Horse Artillery Battalion. Mechanicsburg, Pennsylvania: Stackpole Books, 2002. ISBN 0-8117-0707-5.
- Vandiver, Frank E. Rebel Brass: The Confederate Command System. Baton Rouge, Louisiana: Louisiana State University, 1956.
- Wakelyn, John L. Biographical Dictionary of the Confederate States of America. Westport, Connecticut: Greenwood Press, 1977.
- Warner, Ezra J. (1959). Generals in Gray: Lives of the Confederate Commanders (1st ed.). Baton Rouge: Louisiana State University Press. OCLC 445052.

=== Works on individual leaders ===
- (no author listed) Colonel William Lamb Deay. Wilmington, North Carolina: Carolina Printing Co., 1962.
- Ackinelose, Timothy. Sabers & Pistols: The Civil War Career of Colonel Harry Gilmore, C.S.A. Gettysburg, Pennsylvania: Stan Clark Military Books, 1997.
- Allen, T. Harrell. Lee's Last Major General: Bryan Grimes of North Carolina. Mason City, Iowa: Savas Publishing Co., 2000.
- Anderson, Charles G. Confederate General William R. "Dirty Neck Bill" Scurry. Charles G. Anderson, 1999.
- Anderson, Mabel W. Life of General Stand Watie. Pryor, Oklahoma: 1915.
- Arceneaux, William. Acadian General: Alfred Mouton and the Civil War. Lafayette, Louisiana: University of Southwest Louisiana, 1992.
- Austin, J. Luke. General John Bratton: Sumter to Appomattox. Sewanee, Tennessee: Procter's Hall Press, 2003.
- Ballard, Michael B. Pemberton: A Biography. Jackson, Mississippi: University Press of Mississippi, 1991. ISBN 0-87805-511-8.
- Barefoot, Daniel W. General Robert F. Hoke: Lee's Modest Warrior. Winston–Salem, North Carolina: John F. Blair, 1996.
- Barringer, Sheridan. Fighting for General Lee: Confederate General Rufus Barringer and the North Carolina Cavalry Brigade. Savas Beatie, 2015. ISBN 1-61121-262-6.
- Bean, W. G. Stonewall's Man: Sandie Pendleton. Wilmington, North Carolina: Broadfoot Publishing Company, 1987.
- Bell, John. Confederate Seadog: John Taylor Wood in War and Exile. Jefferson, North Carolina: McFarland & Company, Inc., 2002. ISBN 978-0-7864-1352-2.
- Benan, Gordon B. The Edge of Mosby's Sword: The Life of Confederate Colonel William Henry Chapman. Carbondale, Illinois: Southern Illinois University Press, 2009. ISBN 978-0-8093-2932-8.
- Benedict, Bryce. Jayhawkers: The Civil War Brigade of James Henry Lane. University of Oklahoma Press, 2009. ISBN 0-8061-3999-4.
- Blake, Nelson, M. William Mahone of Virginia: Soldier and Political Insurgent. Richmond, Virginia: Garret & Massie, 1935.
- Blakey, Arch Fredric. General John H. Winder, C.S.A.. University Press of Florida, 1990. ISBN 978-0-8130-0997-1.
- Bragg, C. L. Distinction in Every Service: Brigadier General Marcellus A. Stovall, C.S.A. Shippensburg, Pennsylvania: White Mane Publishing, 2002. ISBN 978-1-57249-291-2.
- Bridges, Hal. Lee's Maverick General: Daniel Harvey Hill. Lincoln, Nebraska: University of Nebraska Press, 1991. ISBN 0-8032-6096-2.
- Brown, Russell K. To the Manner Born: The Life of General William H. T. Walker. Macon, Georgia: Mercer University Press, 2005.
- Bushong, Millard K. and Dean M. Bushong. Fightin' Tom Rosser, C.S.A. Shippensburg, Virginia: Beidel Printing House, Inc., 1983.
- Byrd, IV, Joseph P. Confederate Sharpshooter: Major William E. Simmons: Through the War with the 16th Georgia Infantry and the 3rd Battalion Georgia Sharpshooters. Mercer University Press, 2016. ISBN 978-0881465686.
- Caldwell, Willie Walker. Stonewall Jim: A Biography of General James A. Walker, C.S.A. Elliston, Virginia: Northcross House, 1990. ISBN 0-9617256-4-8.
- Carmichael, Peter S. William R. J. Pegram: Lee's Young Artilleriest. Charlottesville, Virginia: University Press of Virginia, 1995.
- Cisco, Walter Brian. States Rights Gist: A South Carolina General of the Civil War. Shippensburg, Pennsylvania: White Mane Publishing Co., Inc., 1991.
- Clemmer, Gregg S. Old Alleghany: Life and Wars of General Ed Johnson. Staunton, Virginia: Hearthside Publishing Co., 2004. ISBN 0-9650987-3-7.
- Craven, Avery Odelle. Edmund Ruffin, Southerner: A Study in Secession. D. Appleton and Company, 1932. ISBN 0-8071-0104-4.
- Cummings, Charles M. Yankee Quaker Confederate General: The Curious Career of Bushrod Rust Johnson. Fairleigh Dickinson University Press, 1971. ISBN 978-0-9626034-3-3.
- Cunningham, Frank. General Stand Watie's: Confederate Indians. Norman, Oklahoma: University of Oklahoma Press, 1959.
- Daughtry, Mary Bandy. Gray Cavalier: The Life and Wars of General W. H. F. "Rooney" Lee. New York: Da Capo Press, 2003. ISBN 0-306-81173-1.
- Davis, Archie K. Boy Colonel of the Confederacy: The Life and Times of Henry King Burgwyn, Jr.. Chapel Hill, North Carolina: University of North Carolina Press, 1985. ISBN 0-8078-1647-7.
- Davis, William C. Breckinridge: Statesman, Soldier, Symbol. Baton Rouge, Louisiana: Louisiana State University Press, 1974. ISBN 978-0-8071-0068-4.
- Davis, William C. Jefferson Davis: The Man and Hist Hour: A Biography. New York, NY: Harper Collins Publishers, 1991. ISBN 0-06-016706-8.
- Delaney, Norman C. John McIntosh Kell of the Raider Alabama. University, Alabama: University of Alabama Press, 1973.
- Dickinson, Jack L. Jenkins of Greenbottom: A Civil War Saga. Pictorial Histories Publishing Co., 1988. ISBN 0-933126-95-6.
- Dufour, Charles L. Gentle Tiger: The Gallant Life of Roberdeau Wheat. Louisiana State University Press, 1957.
- Elliott, Sam Davis. Soldier of Tennessee: General Alexander P. Stewart and the Civil War in the West. Baton Rouge, Louisiana: Louisiana State University Press, 2004.
- Faulk, Odie. General Tom Green: A Fightin' Texan. Waco, Texas Texian Press, 1963.
- Gallagher, Gary W. Stephen Dodson Ramseur, Lee's Gallant General. Chapel Hill, North Carolina: University of North Carolina Press, 1935. ISBN 0-8078-1627-2.
- Godbold, Jr., E. Stanly and Mattie U. Russell. Confederate Colonel and Cherokee Chief: The Life of William Holland Thomas. Knoxville, Tennessee: University of Tennessee Pres, 1990. ISBN 0-87049-664-6.
- Gordon, Larry. The Last Confederate General: John C. Vaughn and His East Tennessee Cavalry. Minneapolis, Minnesota: Zenith Press, 2009. ISBN 978-0-7603-3517-8.
- Harvey, Paul. Old Tige: General William L. Cabell, CSA. Hill Junior College, Hillsboro, TX, 1970.
- Hattaway, Herman. General Stephen D. Lee. Jackson, Mississippi: University of Mississippi Press, 1976.
- Hilderman, Walter C. III. Theophilus Hunter Holmes: A North Carolina General in the Civil War. McFarland, 2013. ISBN 978-0-7864-7310-6.
- Holland, Cecil. Morgan and His Raiders: A Biography of the Confederate General. New York: Macmillan Company, 1943.
- Holland, Lynwood M. Pierce Young: The Warwick of the South. Athens, Georgia: University of Georgia Press, 1970.
- Horton, Louise. Samuel Bell Maxey: A Biography. Austin, Texas: University of Texas Press, 1974.
- Hughes, Jr., Nathaniel C. Liddell's Record: St. John Richardson Liddell, Brigadier General, CSA Staff Officer and Brigade Commander Army of Tennessee. Louisiana State University Press, 1997. ISBN 0-8071-2218-1.
- Hughes, Jr., Nathaniel C. General William J. Hardee: Old Reliable. Baton Rouge, Louisiana: Louisiana State University Press, 1965.
- Hughes, Jr., Nathaniel C. and Roy P. Stonesifer, Jr. The Life and Wars of Gideon J. Pillow. Knoxville, Tennessee: University of North Carolina Press, 1993.
- Hughes, Jr., Nathaniel Cheairs, Connie Walton Moretti, and James Michael Browne. Brigadier General Tyree H. Bell, C. S. A.: Forrest's Fighting Lieutenant. Knoxville, Tennessee: University of Tennessee Press, 2004.
- Hughes, William J. Rebellious Ranger: Rip Ford and the Old Southwest. Norman, Oklahoma: University of Oklahoma Press, 1964.
- Jeffrey, Thomas E. Thomas Lanier Clingman: Fire Eater from the Carolina Mountains. University of Georgia Press, 1999. ISBN 0-8203-2023-4.
- Jones, Charles C. The Life and Services of Commodore Josiah Tattnall. Savannah, Georgia: 1878.
- Killian, Ron V. General Abner M. Perrin, C.S.A.: A Biography. Jefferson, North Carolina: McFarland & Company, Inc., 2012. ISBN 978-0-7864-6980-2.
- Kinard, Jeff. Lafayette of the South: Prince Camille de Polignac and the American Civil War. College Station, Texas: Texas A&M University Press, 2001.
- Knight, Wilfred. Red Fox: Stand Watie and the Confederate Indian Nations during the Civil War Years in Indian Territory. Glendale, California: 1988.
- Losson, Christopher. Tennessee's Forgotten Warriors: Frank Cheatham and his Confederate Division. University of Tennessee Press, 1990. ISBN 978-0-87049-615-8.
- Marlow, Clayton Charles. Matt W. Ransom, Confederate General from North Carolina. Jefferson, North Carolina: McFarland & Company, Inc., 2006. ISBN 978-0-7864-2735-2.
- Marshall, Park. A Life of William B. Bate: Citizen, Soldier and Statesman. Nashville, Tennessee: Cumberland Press, 1908.
- Martin, Samuel J. Southern Hero: Matthew Calbraith Butler, Confederate General, Hampton Redshirt, and U.S. Senator. Stackpole Books, 2001. ISBN 978-0-8117-0899-9.
- Matthews, Gary Robert. Basil Wilson Duke, C. S. A.: The Right Man in the Right Place. Lexington, Kentucky: University Press of Kentucky, 2005.
- Maxwell, Jerry H. The Perfect Lion: The Life and Death of Confederate Artillerist John Pelham. Tuscaloosa, Alabama: University of Alabama press, 2011. ISBN 978-0-8173-1735-5.
- Mcbride, Mary Gorton and Ann M. McLaurin. Randall Lee Gibson of Louisiana: Confederate General and New South Reformer. Baton Rouge, Louisiana: Louisiana State University Press, 2007. ISBN 978-0-8071-3234-0.
- McCash, William B. Thomas R. R. Cobb (1823–1862): The Making of A Southern Nationalist. Mercer University Press, 1983. ISBN 978-0-86554-049-1.
- McCaslin, Richard B. Fighting Stock: John S. "Rip" Ford of Texas. Fort Worth, Texas: Texas Christian University Press, 2011.
- McKay, Gary. The Sea King: The Life of James Iredell Waddell. 2010. ISBN 978-1-84341-046-1.
- Merchant, Holt. South Carolina Fire-Eater: The Life of Laurence Massillon Keitt, 1824–1864. University of South Carolina Press, 2014. ISBN 1-61117-349-3.
- Mingus, Sr., Scott L. Confederate General William "Extra Billy" Smith: From Virginia's Statehouse to Gettysburg Scapegoat. Savas Beatie, LLC, 2013. ISBN 978-1-61121-129-0.
- Motts, Wayne E. Trust in God and Fear Nothing: Lewis A. Armistead, CSA. Farnsworth House Military Impressions, 1994. ISBN 978-0-9643632-0-5.
- Mueller, Doris Land. M. Jeff Thompson: Missouri's Swamp Fox of the Confederacy. Columbia, Missouri: University of Missouri Press, 2007.
- Neal, Diane and Thomas W. Kremm. Lion of the South: General Thomas C. Hindman. Macon, Georgia: Mercer University Press, 1993. ISBN 0-86554-422-0.
- O'Flaherty, Daniel. General Jo Shelby: Undefeated Rebel. Chapel Hill, North Carolina: University of North Carolina Press, 1954. ISBN 978-0-8078-0651-7.
- Parker, William L. General James Dearing, CSA. H.E. Howard, 1990. ISBN 978-1-56190-001-5.
- Parks, Joseph Howard. General Edmund Kirby Smith, C.S.A. Baton Rouge, Louisiana: Louisiana State University Press, 1954.
- Parks, Joseph H. General Leonidas Polk C.S.A.: The Fighting Bishop. Baton Rouge, Louisiana: Louisiana State University Press, 1962 (republished 1990). ISBN 0-8071-1801-X.
- Patterson, Gerard A. From Blue to Gray: The Life of Confederate General Cadmus Wilcox. Mechanicsburg, Pennsylvania: Stackpole Books, 2001. University of North Carolina Press, 1998.
- Pickett, W. D. Sketch of the Military Career of William J. Hardee, Lieutenant–General, C.S.A. Lexington, Kentucky: James Hughes, Printer, no date.
- Pinnegar, Charles. Brand of Infamy: A Biography of John Buchanan Floyd. Westport: Greenwood Press, 2002.
- Raab, James W. J. Patton Anderson, Confederate General: A Biography. Jefferson, North Carolina: McFarland and Company, 2004. ISBN 978-0-7864-1766-7.
- Raab, James W. Deliverance From Evil: General Francis Asbury Shoup, C.S.A. Infinity Publishing, 2012. ISBN 978-0-7414-7563-3.
- Raab, James W. W. W. Loring: Florida's Forgotten General "Old Blizzards". St. Augustine, Florida: Sunflower University Press, 1996. ISBN 0-89745-205-4.
- Ramage, James A. Gray Ghost: The Life of Col. John Singleton Mosby. University Press of Kentucky, 2010. ISBN 9780813108391.
- Rhoades, Jeffrey L. Scapegoat General: The Story of Major General Benjamin Huger, C.S.A. Hamden, Connecticut: Archon Books, 1985.
- Riedel, Julie Slemons. Brigadier General William F. Slemons, C.S.A. Independence, Missouri: published by author, 1992.
- Robert Grier, Jr. Stephens. Intrepid Warrior: Clement Anselm Evans Confederate General from Georgia: Life, Letters, and Diaries of the War Years. Morningside Bookshop, 1992. ISBN 0-89029-540-9.
- Robins, Glen. The Bishop of the Old South: The Ministry and Civil War Legacy of Leonidas Polk. Macon, Georgia: Mercer University Press, 2006
- Rose, Victor M. The Life and Services of General Ben McCulloch. Philadelphia, Pennsylvania: Pictorial Bureau of the Press, 1888.
- Selcer, Richard F. Lee vs. Pickett: Two Divided by War. Gettysburg, Pennsylvania: Thomas Publications, 1998.
- Siepel, Kevin H. Rebel: The Life and Times of John Singleton Mosby. St. Martin's Press, 1983. ISBN 978-0312665593.
- Silverman, Jason H., Samuel N. Thomas, Jr., and Beverly D. Evans IV. "Shanks": The Life and Wars of Confederate General Nathan G. Evans, CSA. Cambridge, Massachusetts: Da Capo Press, 2002.
- Smith, Gerald J. One of the Most Daring of Men: The Life of Confederate General William Tatum Wofford. Murfreesboro, Tennessee: Southern Heritage Press, 1997.
- Stanley, Henry Morton and Nathaniel Cheairs Hughes (Editor). Sir Henry Morton Stanley, Confederate. Louisiana State University Press, 2000.
- Starr, Stephen Z. Colonel Grenfell's Wars: The Life of a Soldier of Fortune. Louisiana State University Press, 1971. ISBN 978-0-8071-0921-2.
- Taylor, John M. Confederate Raider: Raphael Semmes of the Alabama. Dulles, Virginia: Brassey's Inc., 1994. ISBN 0-02-881086-4.
- Thompson, Jerry. Colonel John Robert Baylor: Texas Indian Fighter and Confederate Soldier. Hillsboro, Texas: Hill Junior College, 1971.
- Thompson, Jerry D. Henry Hopkins Sibley: Confederate General of the West. Northwestern State University, 1987. ISBN 978-0-917898-15-0.
- Thomsen, Paul A. Rebel Chief: The Motley Life of Colonel William Holland Thomas, C.S.A. New York: Tom Doherty Associates, 2004.
- Tucker, Phillip Thomas. The Forgotten "Stonewall of the West": Major General John Stevens Bowen. Macon, Georgia: Mercer University Press, 1997. ISBN 0-86554-530-8.
- Tucker, Leslie R. Brigadier General John Adams, CSA: A Biography. Jefferson, North Carolina: McFarland and Company, 2013. ISBN 0-7864-7484-X.
- Walker, Cornelius Irvine. The Life of Lieutenant General Richard Heron Anderson of the Confederate States Army. Charleston, South Carolina: Art, 1917.
- Waugh, John C. Sam Bell Maxey and the Confederate Indians. Abilene, Texas: McWhiney Foundation Press, 1995.
- Wessels, William L. Born to Be A Soldier: The Military Career of William Wing Loring of St. Augustine, Florida. Texas Christian University Press, 1971.
- White Jr., Frank Everett. Sailor's Creek: Major General G. W. Custis Lee, Captured with Controversy. Schroeder Publications, 2008. ISBN 1-889246-40-9.
- White, William S. (1864). Sketches of the Life of Captain Hugh A. White of the Stonewall Brigade. Columbia, South Carolina: South Carolinian Steam Press. LCCN 08003813. OCLC 9185302. OL 6993624M – via Internet Archive.
- Wilson, Clyde N. The Most Promising Young Man of the South: James Johnston Pettigrew and His Men at Gettysburg. Abilene, Texas: McWhiney Foundation Press, 1998.
- Wilson, Francis W. General William Polk (Old Gotch) Hardeman. 1990. ISBN 0-9619215-2-8.
- Woodward, Harold R. Major General James Lawson Kemper, C.S.A.: The Confederacy's Forgotten Son. Rockbridge Publishing Company, 1993. ISBN 978-0962357275.
- Wynstra, Robert. Rashness Of That Hour: Politics, Gettysburg, and the Downfall of Confederate Brigadier General Alfred Iverson. Savas Beatie, 2010. ISBN 978-1-932714-88-3.

==== Edward Porter Alexander ====
- Alexander, Edward Porter. Military Memoirs of a Confederate: A Critical Narrative. Charles Scribner's Sons, 1912.
- Alexander, Edward Porter and Edited by Gary W. Gallager Fighting for the Confederacy: The Personal Recollections of General Edward Porter Alexander. The University of North Carolina Press, 1989. ISBN 978-0-8078-1848-0.
- Golay, Michael. To Gettysburg and Beyond: The Parallel Lives of Joshua Lawrence Chamberlain and Edward Porter Alexander. New York: Crown Publishers, 1995.
- Klein, Maury. Edward Porter Alexander. Athens, Georgia: University of Georgia Press, 1971.

==== Henry Watkins Allen ====
- Cassidy, Vincent H and Amos E Simpson. Henry Watkins Allen of Louisiana. Louisiana State University Press, 1964.
- Dorsey, Sarah A. Recollections Of Henry Watkins Allen: Brigadier-General Confederate States Army Ex-Governor Of Louisiana (1866). Kessinger Publishing, LLC, 2010.

==== William T. "Bloody Bill" Anderson ====
- Castel, Albert and Thomas Goodrich. Bloody Bill Anderson: The Short, Savage Life of a Civil War Guerrilla. Stackpole Books, 1998.
- Wood, Larry. The Civil War Story of Bloody Bill Anderson. Eakin Press, 2003. ISBN 978-1-57168-640-4.

==== Turner Ashby ====
- Anderson, Paul C. Blood Image: Turner Ashby in the Civil War and the Southern Mind. Louisiana State University Press, 2002. ISBN 978-0-8071-2752-0.
- Ashby, Tomas A. Life of Turner Ashby. New York: Neale Publishing Co., 1914.
- Avirett, Rev. James B. The Memoirs of General Turner Ashby and His Compeers. Kessinger Publishing, LLC, 2010. ISBN 978-1-165-63714-0.
- Bushong, Millard Kessler. General Turner Ashby and Stonewall's Valley Campaign. McClure Printing Company, 1980.
- Cunningham, Frank. Knight of The Confederacy: General Turner Ashby. The Naylor Company, 1960.
- Thomas, Clarence. General Turner Ashby: The Centaur Of The South. Winchester, Virginia: Eddy Press Corps., 1907.

==== P. G. T. Beauregard ====
- Basso, Hamilton. Beauregard: The Great Creole. New York: Charles Scribner's Sons, 1933.
- Roman, Alfred. The Military Operations of General Beauregard in the War Between the States, 1861–1865, two volumes. New York: Harper, 1884.
- Williams, T. Harry. P.G.T. Beauregard: Napoleon in Gray. Baton Rouge: Louisiana State University Press, 1955. ISBN 0-8071-1974-1.

==== Braxton Bragg ====
- Hallock, Judith Lee. Braxton Bragg and Confederate Defeat (Volume 2). University, Alabama: University Alabama Press, 1991. ISBN 978-0-8173-0543-7.
- Hess, Earl J. Braxton Bragg: The Most Hated Man of the Confederacy. Chapel Hill, North Carolina: University of North Carolina Press, 2016. ISBN 978-1-4696-2875-2.
- Martin, Samuel J. General Braxton Bragg C.S.A. Jefferson, North Carolina: McFarland & Co., 2011.
- McWhiney, Grady. Braxton Bragg and Confederate Defeat (Volume 1). University, Alabama: University Alabama Press, 1991. ISBN 978-0-8173-0545-1.
- Seitz, Don C. Braxton Bragg: General of the Confederacy. Columbia, South Carolina: State Co, 1924.

==== Franklin Buchanan ====
- Eliot, George Fielding. Daring sea warrior, Franklin Buchanan. Julian Messner NY, 1962.
- Lewis, Charles L. Admiral Franklin Buchanan: Fearless Man of Action. Baltimore, Maryland: Norman, Remington, 1929.
- Symonds, Craig L. Confederate Admiral: The Life and Wars of Franklin Buchanan. Annapolis, Maryland: Naval Institute Press, 1999.

==== Simon Bolivar Buckner ====
- Russell, Stephen. Simon Bolivar Buckner: Beyond the Southern Storm. Chicago Spectrum Press, 2005. ISBN 978-1-58374-121-4.
- Stickles, Arndt. Simon Boliver Buckner: Borderland Knight. Chapel Hill, North Carolina: University of North Carolina Press, 2001.

==== James D. Bulloch ====
- Kinnaman, Stephen Chapin. Captain Bulloch: The Life of James Dunwoody Bulloch, Naval Agent of the Confederacy. Dog Ear Publishing, 2013. ISBN 978-1-4575-1822-5.
- Wilson, Walter E. and Gary L. McKay. James D. Bulloch: Secret Agent and MasterMind of the Confederate Navy. McFarland, 2012. ISBN 978-0-7864-6659-7.

==== Patrick Cleburne ====
- Buck, Irving. Cleburne and His Command. McCowat Mercer Press, 1959.
- Joslyn, Mauriel. A Meteor Shining Brightly: Essays on the Life and Career of Major General Patrick R. Cleburne. Macon, Georgia: Mercer University Press, 2000. ISBN 0-86554-693-2.
- Nash, Charles E. Biographical Sketches of Gen. Pat Cleburne and Gen. T.C. Hindman. Little Rock, Arkansas: Tunnah and Pittard, 1895.
- Purdue, Howell and Elizabeth Purdue. Pat Cleburne, Confederate General: A Definitive Biography. Hillsboro, Texas: Hill Junior College Press, 1973.
- Stewart, Bruce. Invisible Hero: Patrick R. Cleburne. Mercer University Press, 2009. ISBN 978-0-88146-108-4.
- Symonds, Craig L. Stonewall of the West: Patrick Cleburne and the Civil War. Lawrence, Kansas: University Press of Kansas, 1997.

==== Jubal Early ====
- Bushong, Millard K. Old Jube: A Biography of General Jubal Early. Boyce, Virginia: Carr Publishing Company, 1955.
- Cooling, Benjamin Franklin. Jubal Early: Robert E. Lee's "Bad Old Man". Rowman & Littlefield, 2014. ISBN 978-0-8108-8913-2.
- Osborne, Charles. Jubal: The Life and Times of General Jubal A. Early, CSA. Chapel Hill, North Carolina: Algonquin Books of Chapel Hill, 1992. ISBN 0-8071-1913-X.

==== Richard S. Ewell ====
- Casdorph, Paul D. Confederate General R. S. Ewell: Robert E. Lee's Hesitant Commander. University Press of Kentucky, 2004. ISBN 9780813160276.
- Hamlin, P. G. Old Bald Head (Gen. R.S. Ewell): The Portrait of a Soldier. Strasburg, Virginia: 1940.
- Martin, Samuel J. The Road to Glory: Confederate General Richard S. Ewell. Indianapolis, Indiana: Guild Press of Indiana, 1991.
- Pfanz, Donald C. Richard S. Ewell: A Soldier's Life. Chapel Hill, North Carolina: University of North Carolina Press, .

==== Nathan Bedford Forrest ====
- Ashdown, Paul and Caudill, Edward. The Myth of Nathan Bedford Forrest. Rowman & Littlefield, 2005.
- Browning, Jr., Robert M. Forrest: The Confederacy's Relentless Warrior. Washington, D.C.: Brassey's Inc., 2004.
- Davison, Eddy W. Nathan Bedford Forrest: In Search of the Enigma. Pelican Publishing, 2007. ISBN 1-58980-415-5.
- Henry, R. S. "First With the Most" Forrest. Indianapolis, Indiana: Bobbs-Morrill Company, 1944.
- Hurst, Jack. Nathan Bedford Forrest: A Biography. New York: Alfred A. Knopf, 1993. ISBN 0-394-55189-3.
- Jordon, Thomas and Roger Pryor. The Campaigns of Lieut.–Gen. N. B. Forrest, and of Forrest's Cavalry. New Orleans, Louisiana: Blelock and Company, 1868.
- Sheppart, Eric. Bedford Forrest: The Confederacy's Greatest Cavalryman. New York: Dial Press, 1930.
- Wills, Brian Steel. A Battle from the Start: The Life of Nathan Bedford Forrest. New York: Harper Collins, 1992. ISBN 0-06-016832-3.
- Wyeth, John. That Devil Forrest: Life of General Nathan Bedford Forrest. New York: Harper and Brothers, 1959.

==== John Brown Gordon ====
- Eckert, Ralph Lowell. John Brown Gordon: Soldier, Southerner, American. Baton Rouge, Louisiana: Louisiana State University Press, 1989. ISBN 978-0-8071-1455-1.
- Tankersley, Allen P. John B. Gordon: A Study in Gallentry. Atlanta, Georgia: Whitehall Press, 1955.

==== Wade Hampton III ====
- Ackerman, Robert K. Wade Hampton III. Columbia, South Carolina: University of South Carolina Press, 2007. ISBN 1-57003-667-5.
- Andrew, Jr., Rod. Wad Hampton: Confederate Warrior to Southern Redeemer. Chapel Hill, North Carolina: University of North Carolina Press, 2008.
- Cisco, Walter Brian. Wade Hampton: Confederate Warrior, Conservative Statesman. Washington, D.C.: Brassey's Inc., 2004.
- Longacre, Edward G. Gentleman and Soldier: A Biography of Wade Hampton III. Nashville, Tennessee: Rutledge Hill, 2003.
- Rod, Jr. Andrew. Wade Hampton: Confederate Warrior to Southern Redeemer. The University of North Carolina Press, 2008. ISBN 0-8078-3193-X.
- Wellman, Manley Wade. Giant in Gray: A Biography of Wade Hampton. New York: Charles Scribner's Sons, 1949.

==== A. P. Hill ====
- Hassler, William W. A.P. Hill: Lee's Forgotten General. Chapel Hill, North Carolina: University of North Carolina Press, 1962. ISBN 978-0-8078-0973-0.
- Robertson, James I. General A.P. Hill: The Story of a Confederate Warrior. New York: Random House, 1987. ISBN 0-394-55257-1.

==== John Bell Hood ====
- Dyer, John Percy. The Gallant Hood. New York: Bobbs–Merrill, 1950.
- Hood, Stephen M. John Bell Hood: The Rise, Fall, and Resurrection of a Confederate General. Savas Beatie, LLC, 2013. ISBN 978-1-61121-140-5.
- McMurry, Richard M. John Bell Hood and the War for Southern Independence. Lincoln: University of Nebraska Press, 1992. ISBN 0-8032-8191-9.
- O'Conner, Richard. Hood: Cavalier General. New York: 1949.

==== John D. Imboden ====
- Tucker, Spencer C. Brigadier General John D. Imboden: Confederate Commander in the Shenandoah. Lexington, Kentucky: University Press of Kentucky, 2003. ISBN 9780813122663.
- Woodward, Jr., Harold R. Defender of the Valley: Brig. Gen. John D. Imboden, C.S.A. Berryville, Virginia: Rickbridge Publishing Co., 1996. ISBN 1-883522-09-9.

==== Thomas J. "Stonewall" Jackson ====
- Alexander, Bevin. Lost Victories and the Military Genius of Stonewall Jackson. New York: Henry Holt, 1992.
- Arnold, Thomas J. Early Life and Letters of General Thomas J. Jackson. New York: Fleming H. Revell Co., 1916.
- Casdorph, Paul D. Lee and Jackson. New York: Paragon House, 1992.
- Chambers, Lenoir. Stonewall Jackson, two volumes. New York: William Morrow and Co., 1959.
- Chambers, Lenoir. Stonewall Jackson and the Virginia Military Institute: The Lexington Years. Lexington, Virginia: Garland Gray Memorial Research Center, Stonewall Jackson House, 1959.
- Chase, William C. Story of Stonewall Jackson. Atlanta, Georgia: D.E. Luther, 1913.
- Cook, Roy Bird. The Family and Early Life of Stonewall Jackson. Richmond, Virginia: Old Dominion Press, 1924.
- Cooke, John Esten. Stonewall Jackson. New York: D. Appleton and Co., 1876.
- Davis, Burke. They Called Him Stonewall: A Life of Lt. General T. J. Jackson, C.S.A. New York (Fairfax Press), 1988. ISBN 0-517-66204-3. First published New York: Rinehart, 1954.
- Farwell, Byron. Stonewall: A Biography of General Thomas J. Jackson. New York: W. W. Norton, 1992.
- Greene, A. Wilson. Whatever You Resolve to Be: Essays on Stonewall Jackson. Baltimore, Maryland: Butternut and Blue, 1992.
- Gwynne, S.C. Rebel Yell: The Violence, Passion, and Redemption of Stonewall Jackson. New York: Scribner, 2014. ISBN 978-1-4516-7328-9.
- Henderson, G.F.R. Stonewall Jackson and the American Civil War. London: Longmans, Green and Co., 1943.
- Hettle, Wallace. Inventing Stonewall Jackson: A Civil War Hero in History and Memory. Baton Rouge, Louisiana: Louisiana State University Press, 2011.
- Holsworth, Jerry. Stonewall Jackson and Winchester, Virginia. The History Press, 2012. ISBN 9781609495305.
- Mackowski, Chris and Kristopher D. White. The Last Days of Stonewall Jackson: The Mortal Wounding of the Confederacy's Greatest Icon. Savas Beatie, LLC, 2013. ISBN 978-1-61121-150-4.
- Robertson, James I. Stonewall Jackson: The Man, the Soldier, the Legend New York: Macmillan Publishing U.S.A., 1997. ISBN 0-02-864685-1.
- Selby, John. Stonewall Jackson as Military Commander. Princeton, New Jersey: Van Nostrand, 1968.
- Vandiver, Frank E. Mighty Stonewall. New York: McGraw-Hill, 1957.
- Williams, Jr., Richard G. Stonewall Jackson: The Black Man's Friend. Nashville, Tennessee: Cumberland House, 2006.

==== Micah Jenkins ====
- Baldwin, James J. III. The Struck Eagle: A Biography of Brigadier General Micah Jenkins, and a History of the Fifth South Carolina Volunteers and the Palmetto Sharpshooters. Shippensburg, Pennsylvania: Burd Street Press, 1996. ISBN 1-57249-017-9.
- Swisher, James K. Prince of Edisto: Brigadier General Micah Jenkins, CSA. White Mane Publishing, 2005. ISBN 978-1-57249-304-9.

==== Albert Sidney Johnston ====
- Johnston, William Preston. Life of Gen. Albert Sidney Johnston. New York: D. Appleton and Company, 1878.
- Roland, Charles. Albert Sidney Johnston: Soldier of Three Republics. Austin, Texas: University of Texas Press, 1964. ISBN 0-8131-9000-2.

==== Joseph E. Johnston ====
- Govan, Gilbert E. and James W. Livingwood. A Different Valor: The Story of General Joseph E. Johnston, C.S.A. Westport, Connecticut: 1956.
- Symonds, Craig L. Joseph E. Johnston: A Civil War Biography. W W Norton & Co Inc, 1992. ISBN 978-0-393-03058-7.

==== Fitzhugh Lee ====
- Longacre, Edward G. Fitz Lee: A Military Biography of Major General Fitzhugh Lee, C.S.A. New York: Da Capo, 2004. ISBN 0-306-81384-X.
- Nichols, James L. General Fitzhugh Lee: A Biography. Lynchburg, Virginia: H. E. Howard Co., 1989.

==== Robert E. Lee ====
- Bradford, Gamaliel. Lee The American. Boston, Massachusetts: 1912.
- Brock, R.A., editor. Robert Edward Lee: Soldier, Citizen, and Christian Patriot. Richmond, Virginia: B.G. Johnson, 1897.
- Brooks, W.E. Lee of Virginia. Indianapolis, Indiana: 1932.
- Carmichael, Peter S., ed. Audacity Personified: The Generalship of Robert E. Lee. Baton Rouge, Louisiana: Louisiana State University Press, 2004.
- Casdorph, Paul D. Lee and Jackson. New York: Paragon House, 1992.
- Childe, Edward Lee. The Life and Campaigns of General Lee. Translated by George Litting. London: Chatto and Windus, 1875.
- Connelly, Thomas Lawrence. The Marble Man: Robert E. Lee and His Image in American Society. Baton Rouge, Louisiana: Louisiana State University Press, 1977. ISBN 0-394-47179-2.
- Davis, Burke Gray Fox: Robert E. Lee and the Civil War. New York: The Fairfax Press, 1956. ISBN 0-517-34772-5.
- Davis, William C. Crucible of Command: Ulysses S. Grant and Robert E. Lee - The War They Fought, The Peace They Forged. Boston, Massachusetts: Da Capo Press, 2014. ISBN 978-0-306-82245-2.
- Earle, Peter. Robert E. Lee. New York: Saturday Review Press, 1973. ISBN 0-8415-0256-0.
- Eicher, David J. Robert E. Lee: A Life Portrait. Lanham, Maryland: Taylor Trade Publishing, 1997. ISBN 978-0-87833-147-5.
- Fellman, Michael. The Making of Robert E. Lee. New York: Random House 2000.
- Flood, Charles Bracelen. Lee: The Last Years. Boston, Massachusetts: Mariner Books, 1998.
- Freeman, Douglas S., R. E. Lee, A Biography, four volumes. New York: Charles Scribner's Sons, 1934.
- Fuller, Maj. Gen. J. F. C., Grant and Lee, A Study in Personality and Generalship. Indianapolis, Indiana: Indiana University Press, 1957.
- Gallagher, Gary W. Lee the Soldier. Lincoln, Nebraska: University of Nebraska Press, 1996.
- Allen C. Guelzo Robert E. Lee: A Life. New York: Knopf, 2021.
- Horn, Jonathan. The Man Who Would Not Be Washington: Robert E. Lee's Civil War and His Decision That Changed American History. New York: Scribner, 2015. ISBN 978-1-4767-4856-6.
- Jones, John William. Life and Letters of Robert Edward Lee: Soldier and Man. New York: Neale Publishing, 1906.
- Lee, Fitzhugh. General Lee. New York: D. Appleton, 1884.
- Mason, Emily V. Popular Life of General Robert Edward Lee. Baltimore, Maryland: 1872.
- Maurice, Sir Frederick. Robert E. Lee, the Soldier. Boston, Massachusetts: 1925.
- McCabe, Jr., James D. Life and Campaigns of General Robert E. Lee. New York: 1866.
- McCaslin, Richard B. Lee in the Shadow of Washington. Baton Rouge, Louisiana: Louisiana University Press, 2001.
- McKenzie, John D. Uncertain Glory: Lee's Generalship Re–Examined. New York: Hippocrene Books, 1997. ISBN 0-7818-0502-3.
- Meredith, Roy. The Face of Robert E. Lee in Life and Legend. New York: 1947.
- Nolan, Alan T. Lee Considered: General Robert E. Lee and Civil War History. Chapel Hill, North Carolina: University of North Carolina Press, 1991. ISBN 0-8078-1956-5.
- Pollard, Edward A. The Early Life, Campaigns, and Public Services of R.E. Lee: With a Record of the Campaigns and Heroic Deeds of his Companions in Arms. New York: E.B. Treat and Co., 1871.
- Pryor, Elizabeth Brown. Reading the Man: A Portrait of Robert E. Lee Through His Private Letters. New York: Viking, 2007.
- Reid, Brian Holden. Robert E. Lee: Icon for a Nation. London: Weidenfeld & Nicolson, 2005.
- Riley, Franklin L., editor. General Robert E. Lee After Appomattox. New York: MacMillan, 1922.
- Robertson, James I. Robert E. Lee: Virginian Soldier, American Citizen. New York: Atheneum Books for Young Readers, 2005.
- Sanborn, Margaret. Robert E. Lee: The Complete Man, 1861–1870, two volumes. Philadelphia, Pennsylvania: J. B. Lippincott, 1966–1967.
- Sanborn, Margaret. Robert E. Lee: A Portrait 1807–1861. Philadelphia, Pennsylvania: J.B. Lippencott, 1966.
- Smith, Gene. Lee and Grant: A Dual Biography. New York: McGraw–Hill, 1984.
- Thomas, Emory M. Robert E. Lee: A Biography. New York: W.W. Norton & Co., 1995. ISBN 0-393-03730-4.
- White, Henry A. Robert E. Lee and the Southern Confederacy. New York: 1897.
- Wilson, Woodrow. Robert E. Lee: An Interpretation. Chapel Hill, North Carolina: University of North Carolina Press, 1924.

==== James Longstreet ====
- Connelly, Thomas L. and Barbara L. Bellows. God and General Longstreet: The Lost Cause and the Southern Mid. Baton Rouge, Louisiana: Louisiana State University Press, 1982.
- DiNardo, Richard L. and Albert A. Nofi, editors. James Longstreet: The Man, the Soldier, the Controversy. Conshohocken, Pennsylvania: Combined Publishing, 1998. ISBN 0-938289-96-9.
- Eckenrode, H. J. and Bryan Conrad. James Longstreet: Lee's War House. Chapel Hill, North Carolina: University of North Carolina Press, 1936 (republished in 1986). ISBN 0-8078-1690-6.
- Longstreet, James. From Manassas to Appomattox: Memoirs of the Civil War in America. Da Capo, 1992.
- Piston, William G. Lee's Tarnished Lieutenant: James Longstreet and His Place in Southern History. Athens, Georgia: University of Georgia Press, 1987. ISBN 0-8203-0907-9.
- Wert, Jeffry D. General James Longstreet: The Confederacy's Most Controversial Soldier. New York: Simon & Schuster, 1993. ISBN 0-671-70921-6.

==== John Bankhead Magruder ====
- Casdorph, Paul D. Prince John Magruder: His Life and Campaigns. New York: John Wiley and Sons, 1996. ISBN 978-0-471-15941-4.
- Settles, Thomas M. John Bankhead Magruder: A Military Reappraisal. Baton Rouge, Louisiana: Louisiana State University Press, 2009.

==== Ben McCulloch ====
- Cutrer, Thomas W. Ben McCulloch and the Frontier Military Tradition. The University of North Carolina Press, 1993. ISBN 978-0-8078-2076-6.
- Rose, Victor M. The Life and Services of Gen. Ben McCulloch. Philadelphia, Pennsylvania: no publisher listed, 1888.

==== William Dorsey Pender ====
- Hassler, William W. (Editor). One of Lee's Best Men: The Civil War Letters of General William Dorsey Pender. Chapel Hill, North Carolina: The University of North Carolina Press, 1999. ISBN 978-0-8078-4823-4.
- Longacre, Edward G. General William Dorsey Pender: A Military Biography. Conshohocken, Pennsylvania: Da Capo Press, 2001. ISBN 978-1-58097-034-1.
- Wills, Brian Steel. Confederate General William Dorsey Pender: The Hope of Glory. Louisiana State University Press, 2013. ISBN 0-8071-5299-4.

==== George E. Pickett ====
- Gordon, Lesley J. General George E. Pickett in Life and Legend. Chapel Hill, North Carolina: University of North Carolina Press, 1998. ISBN 978-0-8078-2450-4.
- Longacre, Edward G. Pickett Leader of the Charge: A Biography of General George E. Pickett, C.S.A.. Shippensburg, Pennsylvania: White Man Publishing Company, 1995. ISBN 1-57249-006-3.
- Pickett, George E. The Heart of a Soldier: Intimate Wartime Letters from General George E. Pickett C.S.A. to His Wife. Butternut & Blue, 1996. ISBN 978-1-879664-24-1.

==== Albert Pike ====
- Allsop, Fred W. Albert Pike: A Biography. Little Rock, Arkansas: 1928.
- Brown, Walter Lee. Life of Albert Pike. Fayetteville, Arkansas: University of Arkansas Press, 1997. ISBN 978-1-55728-469-3.
- Duncan, Robert L. Reluctant General: The Life and Times of Albert Pike. New York: no publisher listed 1961.
- Tresner, Jim. Albert Pike: The Man Behind the Monument. M. Evans and Company, Inc., 1995. ISBN 978-0-87131-791-9.

==== Sterling Price ====
- Castel, Albert. General Sterling Price and the Civil War in the West. Baton Rouge, Louisiana: Louisiana State University Press, 1968. ISBN 0-8071-1854-0.
- Rea, Ralph R. Sterling Price, the Lee of the West. Little Rock, Arkansas: Pioneer Press, 1959.
- Reynolds, Thomas C. General Sterling Price and the Confederacy. Missouri History Museum Press, 2009. ISBN 1-883982-68-5. Formerly Unpublished manuscript 1867
- Shalhope, Robert E. Sterling Price, Portrait of a Southerner. Columbia, Missouri: University of Missouri Press, 1971.

==== Robert E. Rodes ====
- Collins, Darrell L. Major General Robert E. Rodes of the Army of Northern Virginia, A Biography. New York: Savas Beatie, 2008. ISBN 978-1-932714-09-8.
- Swisher, James K. Warrior in Gray: General Robert Rodes of Lee's Army. Shippensburg, Pennsylvania: White Mane Books, 2000.

==== J. E. B. Stuart ====
- Brennan, Patrick. To Die Game: Gen. J.E.B. Stuart, CSA. Gettysburg, Pennsylvania: Farnsworth House Military Impressions, 1998.
- Davis, Burke. Jeb Stuart: The Last Cavalier. New York: Rinehart, 1957.
- McClellan, H. B. The Life and Campaigns of Major–General J.E.B. Stuart. Boston, Massachusetts: Houghton Mifflin, 1885.
- Thomas, Emory M. Bold Dragoon: The Life of J.E.B. Stuart. New York: Harper & Row, 1986. ISBN 0-8061-3193-4.
- Thomason, John W. Jeb Stuart. New York: Charles Scribner's Sons, 1930.
- Trout, Robert J. They Followed the Plume: The Story of J.E.B. Stuart and his Staff. Harrisburg, Pennsylvania: Stackpole Books, 1994.
- Wert, Jeffry D. Cavalryman of the Lost Cause: A Biography of J.E.B. Stuart. New York: Simon & Schuster, 2008.

==== Richard Taylor ====
- Mitcham Jr, Samuel. Richard Taylor and the Red River Campaign of 1864. Pelican Publishing, 2012. ISBN 978-1-4556-1633-6.
- Parrish, T. Michael. Richard Taylor: Soldier Prince of Dixie. University of North Carolina Press, 1992. ISBN 0-8078-2032-6.
- Taylor, Richard. Destruction and Reconstruction: Personal experiences of the late war. New York, New York: D. Appleton and Co., 1897.

==== Lloyd Tilghman ====
- Bush, Bryan S. Lloyd Tilghman: Confederate General in the Western Theatre. Acclaim Press, 2006. ISBN 978-0-9773198-3-1.
- Rabb, James W. Confederate General Lloyd Tilghman: A Biography. Jefferson, North Carolina: McFarland and Company, 2006. ISBN 978-0-7864-2460-3.

==== Isaac Ridgeway Trimble ====
- Trimble, David C. Furious, Insatiable Fighter: A Biography of Maj. Gen. Isaac Ridgeway Trimble, C.S.A.. University Press of America, 2005. ISBN 978-0-7618-3251-5.
- Tucker, Leslie R. Major General Isaac Ridgeway Trimble: Biography Of A Baltimore Confederate. McFarland, 2005. ISBN 978-0-7864-2131-2.

==== Earl Van Dorn ====
- Carter, Arthur B. The Tarnished Cavalier: Major General Earl Van Dorn, C.S.A.. Knoxville, Tennessee: University of Tennessee Press, 1999.
- Hartje, Robert G. Van Dorn: The Life and Times of a Confederate General. Nashville, Tennessee: Vanderbilt University Press, 1967.

==== Joseph Wheeler ====
- Dyer, John Percy. From Shiloh to San Juan Hill: The Life of "Fighting Joe" Wheeler. Baton Rouge, Louisiana: Louisiana State University Press, 1961. ISBN 978-0-8071-1809-2.
- Longacre, Edward G. A Soldier to The Last: Major General Joseph Wheeler in Blue and Gray. Washington, D.C.: Potomac Books Inc., 2006. ISBN 978-1-57488-591-0.

== Union & Confederate military leaders ==
=== General reference ===
- Castel, Albert. Articles of War: Winners, Losers, and Some Who Were Both in the Civil War. Mechanicsburg, PA: Stackpole Books, 2001. ISBN 0-8117-0005-4.
- Eicher, John H., and David J.. Civil War High Commands. Stanford, CA: Stanford University Press, 2001. ISBN 0-8047-3641-3.

== See also ==
- List of American Civil War generals (Union)
- List of American Civil War generals (Confederate)
