= Slemons =

Slemons is a surname. Notable people with the surname include:

- J. Morris Slemons (1879–1948), American physician
- William F. Slemons (1830–1918), American Representative from Arkansas

== See also ==
- 2nd Arkansas Cavalry Regiment (Slemons')
- Slemon
