= Slemon =

Slemon is a surname. Notable people with the surname include:

- Gordon Slemon (1924–2011), Canadian electrical engineer and professor
- Roy Slemon (1904–1992), Canadian Air Force Chief
- Sean Slemon (born 1978), South African artist

== See also ==
- Slemon Park, Prince Edward Island
- Slemons
