= 2nd Arkansas Cavalry Regiment (Confederate) =

Cavalry regiment of the Confederate States Army

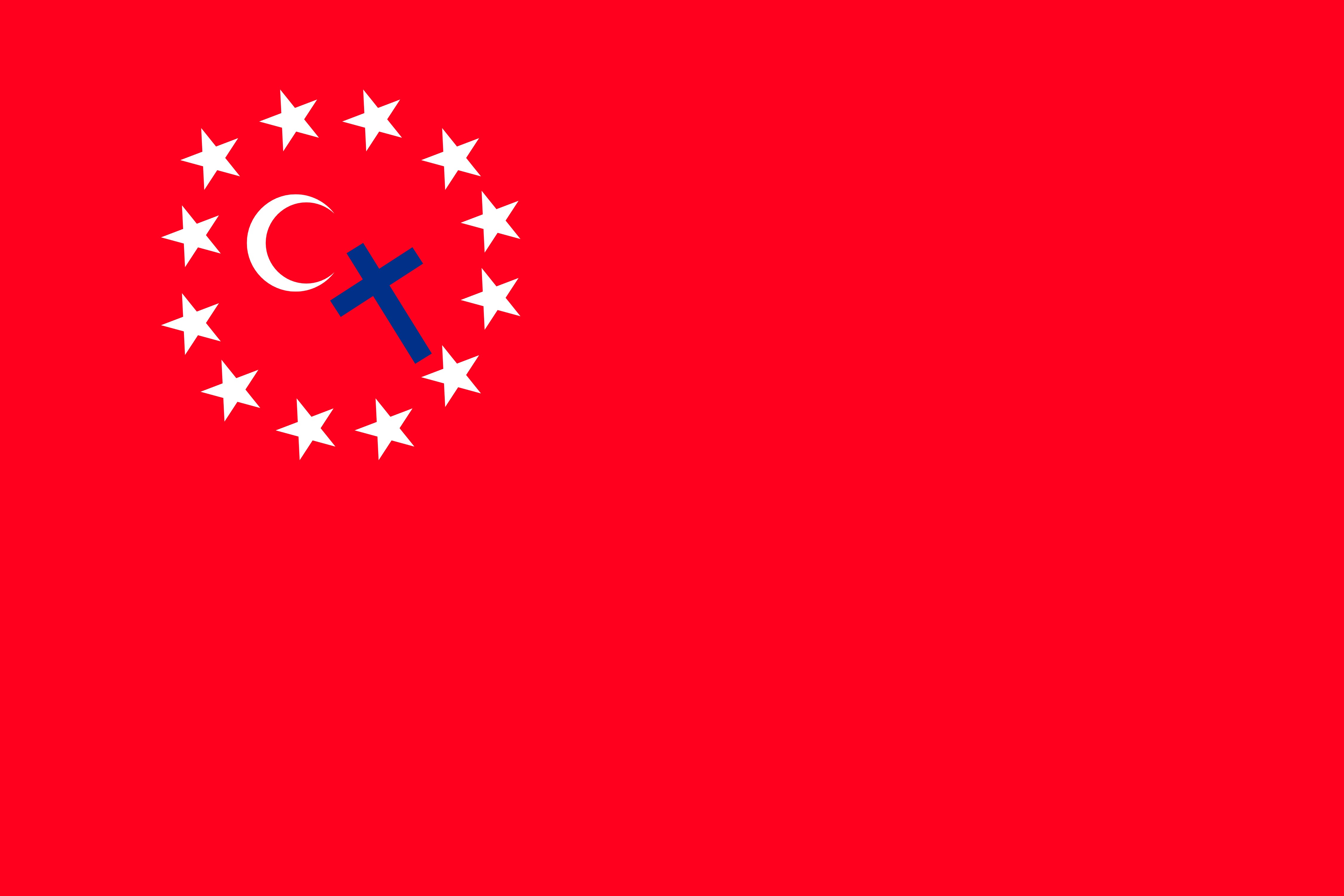
- Regimental standard of Slemons' regiment
- Active: 1862–1865
- Disbanded: May 26, 1865
- Country: Confederate States
- Allegiance: Arkansas
- Branch: Army
- Type: Cavalry
- Size: Regiment
- Nickname: "Slemons' regiment"
- Facings: Yellow
- Battles: American Civil War; Battle of Iuka; Second Battle of Corinth; Battle of Hatchie's Bridge; Battle of Mount Elba; Battle of Poison Spring; Battle of Marks' Mills; Battle of Jenkins Ferry; Battle of Fort Davidson; Fourth Battle of Boonville; Battle of Glasgow, Missouri; Battle of Sedalia; Second Battle of Lexington; Battle of Little Blue River; Second Battle of Independence; Battle of Byram's Ford; Battle of Westport; Battle of Marais des Cygnes; Battle of Mine Creek; Battle of Marmiton River; Second Battle of Newtonia

Commanders
- Notable commanders: Col. William F. Slemons

The 2nd Arkansas Cavalry Regiment, also known as "Slemons' regiment," was a cavalry formation of the Confederate States Army in the American Civil War commanded by Colonel William F. Slemons. The regiment was also referred to in the official records as the 4th Arkansas Cavalry Regiment. Another regiment, commanded by Colonel Thomas J. Morgan, was also designated as the 2nd Arkansas Cavalry Regiment. About December 1864, the 2nd Arkansas Cavalry Regiment was reduced to a battalion and officially redesignated the 18th Arkansas Cavalry Battalion, also known as "McMurtrey's battalion".

== Organization ==
The 2nd Arkansas Cavalry Regiment was originally organized as the 2nd Arkansas Cavalry Battalion at Memphis, Tennessee, in early April 1862, just after the Battle of Shiloh, from five independent cavalry companies from southern Arkansas:.

- Company A — This cavalry company was organized by Captain Alexander Mason at Hampton, Calhoun County, Arkansas, on February 20, 1862. When the Second Arkansas Cavalry Battalion was formed at Memphis, Tennessee, in April 1862, Mason's troop was designated as Company A. Captain Mason resigned on May 12, 1862, and was succeeded by Captain Philip Henry Echols. On May 15, 1862, the Second Arkansas Cavalry Battalion was combined with the Sixth Arkansas Cavalry Battalion to form the Second Arkansas Cavalry Regiment, with the Calhoun County Troop becoming Company H. During the regimental reorganization on August 18, 1862, the company's designation was changed to Company G.
- Company B — This cavalry company was organized by Captain Elisha L. McMurtrey at Mount Elba, Bradley County, Arkansas, on February 22, 1862. When the Second Arkansas Cavalry Battalion was formed at Memphis, Tennessee, in April 1862, McMurtrey's troop was designated as Company B. On May 15, 1862, the Second Arkansas Cavalry Battalion was combined with the Sixth Arkansas Cavalry Battalion to form the Second Arkansas Cavalry Regiment, with the Bradley County Troop becoming Company D.
- Company C — This cavalry company was organized by Captain William Jones Somervell, at Tulip, Dallas County, Arkansas, on March 1, 1862. When the Second Arkansas Cavalry Battalion was formed at Memphis, Tennessee, in April 1862, Somervell's troop was designated as Company C. On May 15, 1862, the Second Arkansas Cavalry Battalion was combined with the Sixth Arkansas Cavalry Battalion to form the Second Arkansas Cavalry Regiment, with Somervell's troop becoming Company E. During the regimental reorganization on August 18, 1862, the Ashley County Troop, Company F, always an understrength unit that was never able to recruit enough men to maintain a full company, was consolidated into this company.
- Company D — This cavalry company was organized by Captain J. N. Paine at Pine Bluff, Jefferson County, Arkansas, on March 1, 1862. When the Second Arkansas Cavalry Battalion was formed at Memphis, Tennessee, in April 1862, Paine's troop was designated as Company D. On May 15, 1862, the Second Arkansas Cavalry Battalion was combined with the Sixth Arkansas Cavalry Battalion to form the Second Arkansas Cavalry Regiment, with the Jefferson County Troop becoming Company G. During the regimental reorganization on August 18, 1862, this company was redesignated as Company F.
- Company E—This cavalry company was organized by Captain Obediah B. Tebbs, a veteran of the famous Third Arkansas Infantry Regiment, at Hamburg, Ashley County, Arkansas, on March 24, 1862. When the Second Arkansas Cavalry Battalion was formed at Memphis, Tennessee, in April 1862, Tebbs' troop was designated as Company E.

Some of these companies appear to have been involved in the Battle of Shiloh as independent units, prior to being assigned to the Second Arkansas Cavalry Battalion, but few details are available. In a letter from Company D's Lt. Walter Greenfield to his wife on April 11, 1862, from his encampment near Shiloh, Greenfield writes:

I do not know what will be done with us. No army equipments [sic] have been issued to us. I may be in a fight perhaps before I write you again and it may be a month. We have not the least idea what will be done with us. If I am in a fight I intend doing my duty an have the same chance we get that every other man. If I get killed, I die in a defence of my country, my wife an babe. Write me often, direct your letters to Corinth, Miss. To Lieut. W Greenfield, care of Capt. J. N. Paine.

Upon the organization of the battalion, Major William D. Barnett, a 36-year-old physician from Bradley County, Arkansas, was assigned as the commanding officer. The only other member of the battalion field and staff who can be identified was Assistant Surgeon Thomas W. Hurley, a 26-year-old physician from Calhoun County, Arkansas. The organization of the battalion was apparently marred by an alleged mutiny. The following report appears in the official record:

Head Quarters Army of the Miss., April 11th, 1862; to General Braxton Bragg, Comdg 2d Corps.—General: It is represented that there is a mutiny in the camp of Major Barnett's Cavalry headed by a Captain Paine of that Battalion. This Battalion is near the encampment of Col. Fagan's Arkansas Regiment of your Corps and Gibson's Brigade. The General therefore orders you to take measures for the radical suppression of the mutiny. Capt. Paine refuses to obey the arrest of Major Barnett. Respectfully, Your obt svt, William Malone, A.A. Genl.

It is unclear just what the circumstances of the alleged mutiny were, or how it was resolved, but on May 15, 1862, this battalion was consolidated with the 6th Arkansas Cavalry Battalion (Major Charles W. Phifer) at Corinth, Mississippi, to form the 2nd Arkansas Cavalry Regiment.

On May 15, 1862, the 2nd Arkansas Cavalry Battalion was combined with the 6th Arkansas Cavalry Battalion to form the 2nd Arkansas Cavalry Regiment, During the regimental reorganization on August 18, 1862, the chronically-understrength Company F (formerly Co. E, Second Battalion) was consolidated into Company E (formerly C, Second Battalion), and Companies G and H were redesignated as Companies F and G, respectively.

The 6th Arkansas Cavalry Battalion (also sometimes known as the 1st, Phifer's, White's and McNeill's Battalion) was organized in August 1861 at Pocahontas, Arkansas, originally composed of four Arkansas companies and two Louisiana companies, which were consolidated about April 20, 1862, into two Arkansas companies and one Louisiana company. The companies of the former 6th Battalion became Companies A-B-C and the companies of the former 2nd Battalion became Companies D-E-F-G-H of the 2nd Arkansas Cavalry Regiment.

The new regiment was placed under the command of Colonel William F. Slemons. The other field officers were:

- Lt. Cols. H.R. Withers and Thomas M. Cochran, and
- Majors Thomas J. Reid, Jr., and William J. Somervell.
- Thomas Garrison was adjutant.
- W. Leeper quartermaster, and
- Wat Strong served as commissary.

Company commanders were:

- Company A – Captain A.H. Christian.
- Company B – "The Drew Light Horse" under the command of Captain Joseph Earle (later H.S. Hudspeth). This company was originally organized as a volunteer militia company in the 52nd Regiment, Arkansas State Militia, on August 13, 1861.
- Company C – Captain Thomas Cochran.
- Company D – Captain James Portis (later "Cpt. Watt Green", probably Cpt. Walter Greenfield).
- Company E – Captain J.S. Somerville, (later Cpt. William Cooper).
- Company F – Captain O.B. Tebbs. This company had served as Company E, Second Arkansas Cavalry Battalion
- Company G – Captain E.L. Murtree (later Cpt. C. Stell).
- Company H – Captain Phil Echols (later Cpt. James Oliver).
- Company I – Captain M.L. Hawkins.

== Service ==
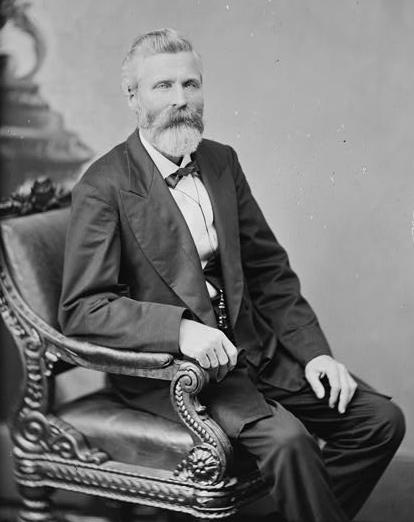
William F. Slemons

The 2nd Arkansas Cavalry Regiment, under Colonel William Ferguson Slemons, would establish an impressive record under General Nathan Bedford Forrest. The unit served in the Army of the West and the Department of Mississippi and East Louisiana, and took an active part in the Battles of Iuka, Corinth, and Hatchie Bridge.

Organization of the Confederate Army of West Tennessee, Major General Earl Vand Dorn Commanding at the Battle of Corinth, listed Slemon's Regiment as assigned to Brigadier General Frank Crawford Armstrong's Cavalry Brigade of Brigadier General Dabney H. Maury's Division of Major General Sterling Price's Corps (Army of the West). On the retreat from Corinth to Tupelo, Mississippi, the 2nd Arkansas Cavalry served as part of the rear guard of the army, under General John C. Breckinridge. On April 9, 1862, it was transferred from Memphis to a camp near Cornith, Mississippi under difficult conditions. In an April 11, 1862 letter to his wife, Captain Walter Greenfield writes:

April 11, 1862. Cornith, Miss. We were ordered day before yesterday to prepare to come from Memphis to this place and had only two hours to get ready in. We had no time to cook rations, and about the time we got to the depot it commenced raining and rained all night and we were compelled to stand in rank and take it. It took us all night to get our horses on the cars, and two days to get to this place without anything to eat except which we picked up on the road and I assure you it was very scarce. None of the men had one full meal for three days and our horses nothing. Your imagination can't picture the suffering and privation of a soldiers life and if any men ought to be well cared for God knows it is the poor soldier. Walt Greenfield

On July 3, 1862, it was ordered with Clayton's 2nd Alabama Cavalry against the Federals at Booneville, MS, who were completely routed. Together with the 2nd Missouri Cavalry, it was ordered under Gen. Frank C. Armstrong to Tennessee, where it met at Middleburg, TN, the Federals under Colonel Leggett and defeated them, killing and wounding large numbers of the Federal force. In late July 1862, the 2nd Arkansas, under Col. Slemons, along with the 2nd Missouri and the 4th Mississippi engaged the escort of Federal cavalry and artillery guarding a train of supplies at Britton's Lane, TN, and after a stubborn fight of three hours captured the train, along with 300 prisoners and two pieces of artillery. The 2nd Arkansas lost 70 men killed or wounded in this engagement. In the campaigns of Price and Pemberton in early 1863 defending the approaches to Vicksburg, the 2nd Arkansas was in continuous active service, opposing Federal thrusts at Iuka, Colliersville, Salem, the Yazoo Pass, at Charleston, Austin, and near Commerce, Mississippi and along the Coldwater River. Under the command of Major General Nathan Bedford Forrest in late 1863, it participated in the masterly movements of that greatest of cavalry commanders, encircling armies, taking cities, capturing trains, and burning bridges.

Camps near Grenada,

Jany 31st, 1863. Lieut. Genl. J. C. Pemberton, Jackson, Miss.

General: It has now been two months since I was put under arrest by Genl Jackson. The Court Marshal has passed upon my offenses some weeks since, but I am still denied the privileges of a freeman and the rights and respect of an officer won on many a hard fought battlefield. I have been in the service for two long years, entered it with —— on my shoulders, have served in the Army of Mo., Ky. and Miss., and under more than twenty different Genls, but never until I fell into the hands of Genl Jackson have I been the subject of the slightest rebuke. The 2d Arks Cavalry boasts of more sabre wounds than all the cavalry of the West put together. Yet for doing that which every officer in the service has repeatedly done I am deprived of my sword and the privilege of ending the most galling —— of since the invader in this —— crisis of our struggle when every moment is —— with the fate of our infant Confederacy. Personally I should care nothing about it as I neither expect to be a politician or soldier by profession. But for the gratification of a wife and many friends who anxious await the final result of the wanton attempt to crush me, I most earnestly ask that the proceeding of the court be published. If I am to be r—tated let it be done at once. If I am to be returned to command of my men it is of the first importance to me, to them and to the country as many of them stung by the injustice done me in the premises are leaving and going to the State of Arks.

General Jackson, not content with his invidious attempt to crush me, has, while I was powerless, distressed my regiment by detaching the finest companies, two of which have been sent south to conscript for Mississippi. The other has been permanently detached and attached to Col. Earle, 3rd Arkansas Regiment, without my knowledge or consent, for the reason that a few men in said company once belonged to that regiment. The company never was in any way attached or mustered with the regiment. These facts are all known to —— the — — command. General Jackson and General Van Dorn have been informed of the facts, but refuse to send them back.

I have never asked the Confederacy for a favor, but I do ask in this case that simple justice may be done me and that it be done at once. If I am to be publicly disgraced, the sooner it is done the longer time I should have to effuse it on some other field. If I am to be vindicated in my rights, justice demands that it should be done at once.

I am well aware of the numerous important matters —— press upon you, but this I hope will meet your early attention.

Hoping, General, that in this I violate none of the military or civic morals, I am, with sentiments of high regard, your obedient servant,

W. F. SLEMONS,

Col. 2d Arks Cavly.

=== Transferred to the Trans-Mississippi ===
By late 1863, the 2nd Arkansas Cavalry had been greatly reduced by casualties and absenteeism. On August 4, 1863, Colonel Slemon's wrote to his wife regarding the condition on his command saying,

nearly half of my men are sick now and the prospect very [?] that the other half will run off soon they some where caught the infection from the people here Col Withers has tendered his resignation says he cant soldier on this side the River [think] he is whiped [sic] he puts it upon the grounds of his family. I have not heard from my application to transfer my command across the river.

On August 11, Slemons again wrote about his men gradually slipping back west of the Mississippi River,

Col Withers has gone home again I hope he will stay this time has tendered his resignation he is worth nothing to the service with me some of my men have run off it is reported that he told them if they would report over time it would be all right I have 20 men in pursuit of them hope to catch them before they get over the river.

On August 13 Slemons wrote:

pretty often now my men are crossing the river very Rapidly I fear Brother Withers has acted badly the men charge him [?] but say nothing of this to any one It may be doing him injustice but he is certainly very [trifling].... If my men keep running away they will soon all be gone the weather is exceedingly warm and many of the men are sick Jackson and Tillman are both sick also Garison has been and still sick in the country Bilious fever he has authority to go home and rase [sic] a company will start as soon as he is able to travel The President has issued his proclamation pardoning all deserters who return to units in 20 days after his order is published in This State also returning all who are in prison convicted of Desertion this county full of them doing all kind of Devilment.

HEADQUARTERS FIFTH MILITARY DISTRICT,

DEPARTMENT OF MISSISSIPPI AND EAST LOUISIANA, Grenada, August 24, 1863. Major General S. D. LEE, Commanding Cavalry:

GENERAL: In compliance with your request I have the honor to submit the following report showing the disposition of the forces under my command at the time of the recent raid by the enemy:

...I learn from Colonel Slemons, Second Arkansas Regiment, who was in command during my absence, that when he reached Grenada on his retreat from Panola he had but little more than 700 men with him. This was composed of the Second Missouri and Seventh Tennessee Regiments and Willis' (Texas) battalion, the Second Arkansas Regiment, reduced by desertion to 42 men,....

I am, general, very respectfully, your obedient servant,

JAS. R. CHALMERS,

Brigadier-General.

An again on August 25, 1863, Colonel Slemons wrote,

My Reg [sic] is well nigh broken up I suppose Withers is the cause of it from what I can hear It is possible that I will get a transfer for the [?] of my Reg [sic] though Gnl [sic] Lee offers me any commd [sic] I may desire on this side.

HEADQUARTERS CAVALRY IN MISSISSIPPI,

Morton, September 1, 1863.

[Colonel B. S. EWELL,

Assistant Adjutant-General:]

SIR: As the result of my recent tour of inspection I have the honor to submit the following report:....

Chalmers' cavalry command on Tallahatchie, extending as far east as Rocky Ford, consists of First [Seventh] Tennessee, Second Missouri, Willis' (Texas) battalion, and Second Arkansas, numbering, all told, not to exceed 600 effective men, the regiments being much reduced; one, the Second Arkansas, having but 40 enlisted men.

On September 4, 1862, Col Slemons wrote "I shall send some officers over in a few days to gather up my Deserters may possibly come myself."

SPECIAL ORDERS, HDQRS. TRANS-MISSISSIPPI DEPARTMENT, No. 144 Shreveport, La., September 22, 1863.

VII. Capt's. E. L. McMurtrey and O B. Tebbs and Lt's H. A. Small, B. C. Marshall, G. W. Stephens, A. Cooper, and W. H. Cooper, Second Arkansas Cavalry, will at once, under the direction of the senior officer above named, proceed to the counties of Calhoun, Bradley, Ashley, Drew, Jefferson, and Dallas, to collect the absentees from said regiment, reporting to these headquarters on the completion of this duty. So soon as communication with the east of the Mississippi River is opened, these men will rejoin their brigade.

By command of Lieut. Gen. E. Kirby Smith

It appears that the officers that Colonel Slemons sent west of the Mississippi River were successful in reassembling parts of the regiment, but they did not rejoin Colonel Slemons on the east side of the river. This led to the existence of one group known as McMurtrey's Arkansas Cavalry Battalion, commanded by Captain E. L. McMurtrey of the 2nd Arkansas, and a second group known as the 2nd Arkansas Cavalry Regiment, under the command of Captain O B. Tebbs, operating in the Confederate Department of the Trans-Mississippi before the regiment was officially transferred to that Department from the Department of Mississippi and East Louisiana.

HEADQUARTERS CAVALRY IN MISSISSIPPI,

Canton, September 16, 1863.

Brigadier General J. R. CHALMERS,

Commanding Cavalry Brigade, Grenada, Miss.:

....Your request to have Colonel Slemons ordered to Arkansas is approved by the major-general commanding, and you will issue the order accordingly.

S. COOPER,

Adjutant and Inspector General.

And December 9, 1863:

HEADQUARTERS CABELL'S BRIGADE, December 9, [1863] 7 p. m. Brig. Gen. J. S. MARMADUKE, Commanding Cavalry Division: GENERAL: The scout I sent in the direction of Rockport returned this afternoon, having been within 6 miles of that place. Dr. Gray, whom you may probably know, living within a mile of Rockport, told the lieutenant in command of the scout that the Federals left them day before yesterday at 11 o'clock, taking the road to Tulip. They had 2,500 cavalry and eight pieces of artillery, and stated to Dr. Gray that they were going to Camden. Captain McMurtrey reported that they had no artillery. He probably saw only their advance guard. I enclose you a note received from Lieutenant Perry,* who is now on the Princeton road. About 200 Federals did come to [illegible] yesterday, fed their horses, and left at once for Tulip. Dr. Gray reports that they fed from his corn and what they did not feed they destroyed. Treated his son-in-law (Miller) in the same way-I am inclined to think they have gone to Camden, and that they will take the Pine Bluff road from there. No Federals in Rockport. If they are as strong as reported, they may attempt to get between us and the infantry. Respectfully, your obedient servant, W. L. CABELL, Brigadier-General, Commanding

On October 18, 1863, General Orders No. 86, Headquarters Cavalry in Northern Mississippi listed Colonel Slemons in command of a brigade consisting of the 2nd Arkansas Cavalry, 3rd Regiment Mississippi State Cavalry, 7th Regiment Tennessee Cavalry, Colonel George's Cavalry Regiment and McLendon's Battery of 6 pounders.

SPECIAL ORDERS,

HDQRS. FORREST'S CAVALRY DEPT.,

Numbers 14.

Near Como, Miss., January 25, 1864.

I. Colonel W. F. Slemons, Second Arkansas Cavalry, is relieved from duty with this command, and will turn over his brigade to the senior officer present and report to Major General N. B. Forrest for orders. In parting with Colonel Slemons, the brigadier-general commanding feels that he has lost a bold and gallant officer, whose long service in the cavalry of this department has won for him the respect and confidence of his commanding officers and the love and obedience of his troops. The officers of his staff will remain on duty until relieved.

By order of Brigadier-General Chalmers:

A. G. MILLS,

Acting Assistant Adjutant-General.

Colonel Slemons was still requesting a return to Arkansas from Alabama in March 1864: 3/5/64 Demopolis-Col Slemons asks that himself and certain officers be allowed to proceed to the Trans Miss to gather up absentees-appd Gen Polk

=== Camden Expedition ===
While Colonel Slemons himself was still east of the Mississippi River, members of the 2nd Arkansas Cavalry who had reformed west of the river fought in Cabell's, Gano's, and Dockery's brigades in the Camden Expedition including the battles of Mount Elba, Poison Spring, Marks' Mills, and Jenkins' Ferry.

Report of Col William A. Crawford, Ark Cavalry, cdg Bgde, of engagement at Poison Spring Hqs BGDE In the Field-I have the honor to submit the following report of the part enacted by the troops of my Bgde in the engagement with the enemy at Poison Spring on the 18th: A portion of my Bgde, consisting of Crawford's and Wright's Regts and Poe's battalion, were dismounted and placed on the right of Gen Cabell's Bgde as a support for Hughey's battery. The 2nd Ark Cav, Capt Tebbs cdg, were placed (mounted) on the extreme right to protect the flank. Skirmishers were placed in my front, who kept up a brisk and successful fire. I remained so placed until I was ordered forward by Brig-Gen Cabell, Cdg division. My command moved rapidly and steadily forward, firing volley upon volley at the fleeing foe. The 2nd Ark Cav charged them on horseback, and men and officers acted well, capturing two pieces of the enemy's artillery. Capt Snell, of this Regt, deserves especial notice, and Capt Tebbs acted like a hero until he was wounded and carried from the field. My dismounted men pursued rapidly the enemy for 21 miles, shouting and huzzaing, and bringing back with them four pieces of artillery that had been captured from time enemy. All, every officer and soldier, fought like men, and deserve much credit. The casualties in the Bgde were 1 man killed and 7 wounded. I am much indebted to Capt's Warren, McFarland, McCabe, and Lt Webb, of my staff, for their valuable services. They discharged well their duties and acted most gallantly.

=== Price's Missouri Raid ===
The first official mention of Colonel Slemons transfer to the Trans Mississippi is by the Union Colonel Clayton in June 1864:

PINE BLUFF, June 18, 1864. Capt. C. H. DYER, AAG: Hearing of Col Slemons and his command being encamped near, 1 sent out a reconnoitering party. They have returned, and report that he has moved in the direction of Monticello. The party followed on their trail about 20 miles. The scout of 200 men of the 13th Ill Cavalry have returned. They brought in some 200 head of cattle from the Watesca Bayou. There is plenty of beef-cattle near Arkansas Post, on the prairie.

— POWELL CLAYTON

During the Summer of 1864, the now reconsolidated regiment was recruited up to strength with ten companies. One of these companies, the Ashley Rangers, was an Arkansas Company which had spent most of the war attached to a Louisiana unit.

The regiment then served with Price's Army on the raid to the Missouri River in September and October 1864, and engaged in the battles of Pilot Knob, Independence, West Point, and Marais des Cygnes, in Kansas. During the Battle of Marais des Cygnes, in Kansas. Colonel Slemons' horse was killed and fell with him, the saddle catching the colonel's leg under him so that he could nor disengage himself. Col Slemons, a number of his officers, 100 of his men, and two artillery pieces were captured and sent as prisoners of war to Johnson Island, later to Rock Island, where they were imprisoned until after the end of the war.

11/10/64 (Camp No. 67).—Order for Cabell's and Slemons' Bgdes approved. Slemons' command, under Col Crawford, furloughed to 12/10, to rendezvous at Miller's Bluff. Cabell's Bgde, under Lt-Col Reiff, to rendezvous 12/10 at Spring Hill, Ark.

A remnant of Slemon's Bgde under Crawford of probably 300 and probably that number of Cabell's under Monroe reported for duty at Champagnolle during Jan 1865. The remainder of the regiment was reduced to battalion size and reorganized and renamed as the 18th Arkansas Cavalry Battalion, which was also referred to as McMurtrey's Arkansas Cavalry Battalion, under the command of Lieutenant Colonel Elisha Lawley McMurtrey.

On March 8, 1865, Union scouts reported that Slemons' Brigade was in south Arkansas watching the Washita (Ouachita) River.

=== Campaign Credit ===
- Iuka-Corinth Campaign

- Battle of Iuka

- Battle of Corinth
- Battle of Hatchie's Bridge

- Red River Campaign, Arkansas Mar-May, 1864.

- Battle of Mount Elba, Arkansas, March 29, 1864.

- Battle of Poison Spring, Arkansas, April 18, 1864.
- Battle of Marks' Mills, Arkansas, April 25, 1864.
- Battle of Jenkins Ferry, Arkansas April 30, 1864.

- Price's Missouri Raid, Arkansas-Missouri-Kansas, September–October, 1864.

- Battle of Fort Davidson, Missouri, September 27, 1864.
- Fourth Battle of Boonville, Missouri, October 11, 1864.
- Battle of Glasgow, Missouri, October 15, 1864.
- Battle of Sedalia, Missouri, October 15, 1864.
- Second Battle of Lexington, Missouri, October 19, 1864.
- Battle of Little Blue River, Missouri, October 21, 1864.
- Second Battle of Independence, Missouri, October 21–22, 1864.
- Battle of Byram's Ford, Missouri, October 22–23, 1864.
- Battle of Westport, Missouri, October 23, 1864.
- Battle of Marais des Cygnes, Linn County, Kansas, October 25, 1864.
- Battle of Mine Creek, Missouri, October 25, 1864.
- Battle of Marmiton River, Missouri, October 25, 1864.
- Second Battle of Newtonia, Missouri, October 28, 1864.

== Surrender ==
This regiment surrendered with the Army of the Northern Sub District of Arkansas in April 1865. However in an obituary http://www.argenweb.net/jefferson/history/pioneer-families/greenfield-captain-walter.html indicate a surrender in Pine Bluff Arkansas of some soldiers in June 1865.

== See also ==
- List of Confederate units from Arkansas
