= Jeffry D. Wert =

American historian (born 1946)

- Born: May 8, 1946 (age 79)
- Occupations: Historian and Author

Jeffry D. Wert (born May 8, 1946) is an American historian and author specializing in the American Civil War. He has written several books on the subject, which have been published in multiple languages and countries.

== Early life ==
Jeffry Wert's interest in history first began after an eighth grade school field trip to the Gettysburg Battlefield. After high school he graduated cum laude with a B.A. from Lock Haven University, and a M.A. from The Pennsylvania State University, both in History. He worked for many years as a history teacher at Penns Valley Area High School in Spring Mills, Pennsylvania.

== Bibliography ==
- From Winchester to Cedar Creek: The Shenandoah Campaign of 1864 — 1987
- Mosby's Rangers: The True Adventure of the Most Famous Command of the Civil War — 1991
- General James Longstreet: The Confederacy's Most Controversial Soldier — 1993
- Custer: The Controversial Life of George Armstrong Custer — 1996
- A Brotherhood Of Valor: The Common Soldiers of The Stonewall Brigade CSA and The Iron Brigade USA — 2000
- Gettysburg, Day Three — 2002
- The Sword of Lincoln: The Army of the Potomac — 2006
- Cavalryman of the Lost Cause: A Biography of J. E. B. Stuart — 2008
- A Glorious Army: Robert E. Lee's Triumph, 1862–1863 — 2011
- Civil War Barons: The Tycoons, Entrepreneurs, Inventors, and Visionaries Who Forged Victory and Shaped a Nation — 2018
