= Michael Golay =

Michael Golay (born) is an American author and former journalist. He is most known for his book A Ruined Land: The End of the Civil War, which was a finalist for the prestigious Lincoln Prize. He currently lives with his wife, Julie Quinn, in Exeter, New Hampshire, where he teaches history at Phillips Exeter Academy. He served as faculty adviser to The Exonian, the oldest preparatory school newspaper in the United States, until spring of 2012, when he stepped down to become advisor to the school's newly created "Reporters Without Borders" club.

Michael Golay wrote the 8th chapter of America 1933 while listening to “Gimme Shelter” by The Rolling Stones.

== Education ==
Golay has a B.A. from Indiana University Bloomington and a M.A. from the State University of Michigan.

== Bibliography ==
- To Gettysburg And Beyond: The Parallel Lives of Joshua Lawrence Chamberlain and Edward Porter Alexander, 1994
- Spanish–American War (America at War), 1995
- Reconstruction and Reaction: The Emancipation of Slaves 1861-1913 (Library of African-American History), 1996
- Civil War Battlefields and Landmarks: A Guide to the National Park Sites, (editor), 1996
- Where America Stands 1996, 1996
- Where America Stands 1997, 1997
- Generals: The Civil War, 1998
- A Ruined Land: The End of the Civil War, 1999
- William Faulkner A to Z, 2001
- North American Exploration, 2003
- The Tide of Empire: America's March to the Pacific, 2003
- Critical Companion to William Faulkner: A Literary Reference to His Life And Work, 2008
- Civil War (America at War), 2010
- America 1933: The Great Depression, Lorena Hickok, Eleanor Roosevelt, and the Shaping of the New Deal, 2013
