= J. Morris Slemons =

American physician

J. Morris Slemons A.B., M.D., F.A.C.S.
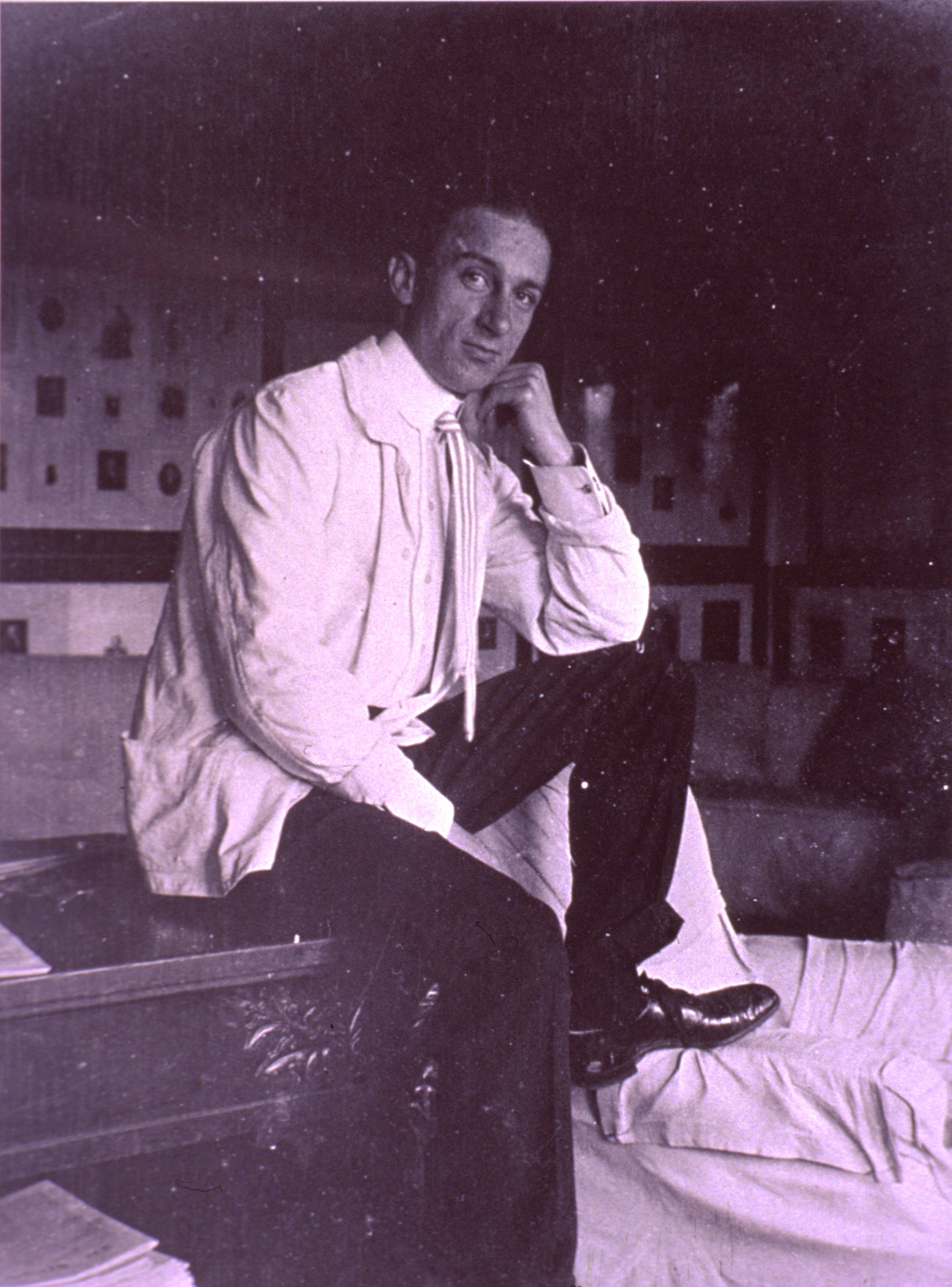
- Born: November 9, 1879; Salisbury, Maryland
- Died: 1948

Josiah Morris Slemons (1879–1948) was an American physician who researched and wrote on issues of pregnancy and prenatal nutrition.

== Personal life ==
Josiah Morris Slemons was born in Salisbury, Maryland on November 9, 1879. He was the son of Francis Marion, M.D., and Martha Ann (Morris) Slemons. On August 2, 1904, Slemons married Anne M. Goodwill of Minneapolis, Minnesota. He died in 1948 in Los Angeles, California.

== Career ==
Slemons received an A.B. from Johns Hopkins University in 1887 and an M.D. from Johns Hopkins Medical School in 1901. Slemons remained at Johns Hopkins for his internship and residency (1901-1904), as well as beginning his medical career as an instructor and then an assistant professor (1904-1913). In 1907, he carried out graduate work in Berlin, Germany. From 1913-1915, Slemons was the gynecologist-in-chief and director of the Woman's Clinic at the University of California. In 1914, Slemons was asked to form the Department of Obstetrics at Yale School of Medicine; the first clinical department at Yale to hire full-time faculty members. He remained at Yale for six years before returning to the University of California.

Slemons conducted research and published in the area of pregnancy and prenatal health. His most widely-known work, "The Prospective Mother; A Handbook for Women During Pregnancy" was written for women with no medical knowledge, designed to answer common questions and provide practical health information. In addition, he published a number of research papers on the biochemistry of the fetal circulatory system and the placenta (see Bibliography).

At the end of World War I, Slemons and his wife traveled to France with the American Red Cross as part of a team of specialists. Their purpose was to provide education on prenatal hygiene and fetal nutrition in an effort to increase the birth rate, which had dropped precipitously during the war.

== Bibliography ==
- Koelker, Arthur H.; Slemons, J. Morris (1 July 1911). "The Amino-Acids in the Mature Human Placenta". Journal of Biological Chemistry. 9 (6): 471–489. doi:10.1016/S0021-9258(18)91446-8. ISSN 0021-9258.
- Slemons, J. Morris (October 9, 1915). "Placental bacteremia". JAMA. 15 (15): 1265–1268. doi:10.1001/jama.1915.02580150039011. Archived from the original on 2023-01-31.
- Slemons, J. Morris; Bogert, L. Jean (1 October 1917). "The uric acid content of maternal and fetal blood". Journal of Biological Chemistry. 32 (1): 63–69. doi:10.1016/S0021-9258(18)86658-3. ISSN 0021-9258.
- Slemons, J. Morris (3 May 2016). The Nutrition of the Fetus. Creative Media Partners. ISBN 978-1-355-31878-1.
- Slemons, J. Morris (1919). The Prospective Mother: A Handbook for Women During Pregnancy. New York: D. Appleton & Co.
