= William F. Slemons =

American politician

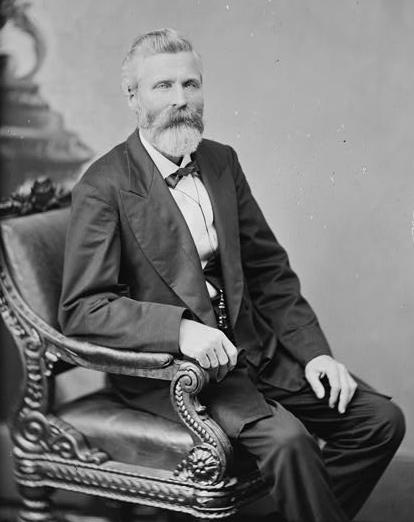

Member of the U.S. House of Representatives from Arkansas's 2nd district
- In office March 4, 1875 – March 3, 1881
- Preceded by: Oliver P. Snyder
- Succeeded by: James K. Jones

Personal details
- Born: William Ferguson Slemons; March 15, 1830 Dresden, Tennessee, U.S.
- Died: December 10, 1918 (aged 88) Monticello, Arkansas, U.S.
- Party: Democratic
- Education: Bethel College

Military service
- Allegiance: Confederate States
- Branch: Army
- Years of service: 1861–1865
- Rank: Colonel
- Unit: 2d Arkansas Cavalry
- Battles/wars: American Civil War

William Ferguson Slemons (March 15, 1830 – December 10, 1918) was a U.S. representative from Arkansas.

== Biography ==
Born in Dresden, Tennessee, Slemons attended Bethel College. He moved to Arkansas in 1852. He studied law, including at Cumberland University. He was admitted to the bar in 1855 and practiced in Monticello, Drew County. He served as member of the Arkansas State convention in 1861. He entered the Confederate States Army in July 1861 and served as colonel of the 2d Arkansas Cavalry in Price's Cavalry during the Civil War. In the Fall of 1864, while fighting in Kansas, Slemons had his horse shot out from under him, and he and a large part of his regiment were captured. For the remainder of the war, he was held captive by Union forces. He resumed the practice of law. He served as district attorney 1866-1868.

Slemons was elected as a Democrat to the Forty-fourth, Forty-fifth, and Forty-sixth Congresses (March 4, 1875 – March 3, 1881). He was not a candidate for renomination in 1880. He resumed the practice of his profession in Monticello. County and probate judge of Drew County 1903-1907. He was in the Justice of the Peace 1908-1918. He died in Monticello, December 10, 1918 and was interred in Union Ridge Cemetery, near Monticello.

== Sources ==
- United States Congress. "William F. Slemons (id: S000484)". Biographical Directory of the United States Congress. Retrieved on 2008-02-14

U.S. House of Representatives
Preceded by Oliver P. Snyder	Member of the U.S. House of Representatives from Arkansas's 2nd congressional district March 4, 1875 – March 3, 1881	Succeeded by James K. Jones
