= Marsh-Warthen House =

Historic house in Georgia, United States

- Marsh--Warthen House
- U.S. National Register of Historic Places
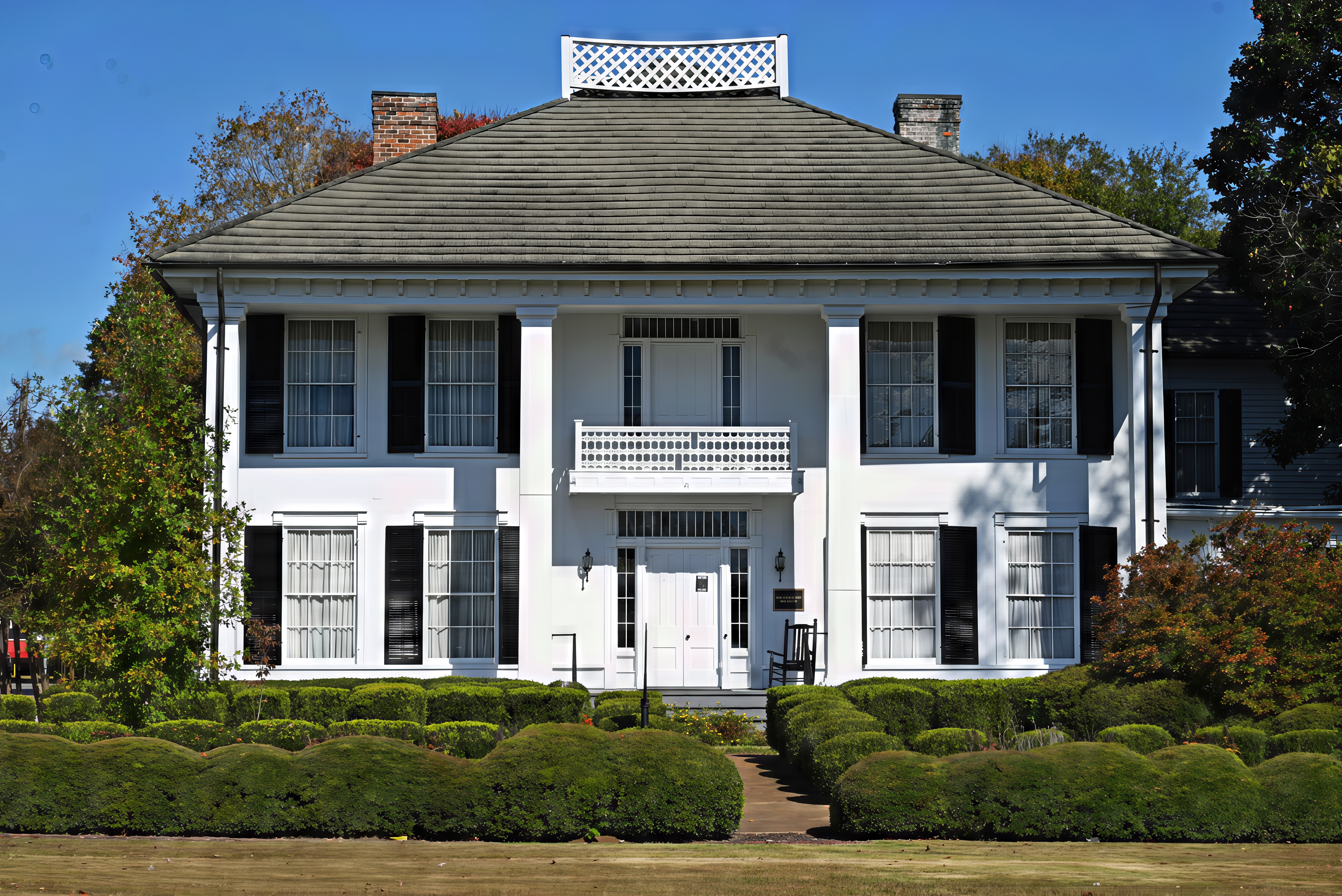

- Location within Georgia Location within the United States
- Location: N. Main St., Lafayette, Georgia
- Coordinates: 34°42′33″N 85°16′52″W
- Area: 1.6 acres (0.65 ha)
- Built: c.1836, c.1895-1910, c.1935
- Built by: Marsh, Spencer
- Architectural style: Greek Revival, Colonial
- NRHP reference No.: 04001467
- Added to NRHP: January 12, 2005

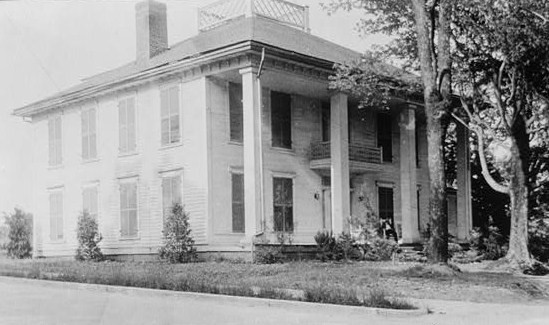
HABS photo from 1936, with no Colonial Revival details evident

The Marsh-Warthen House in Lafayette, Georgia is a historic Greek Revival house that is listed on the National Register of Historic Places. It is open as a historic house museum and events venue, and is owned by the government of Walker County, Georgia.

The house was built c.1836 and expanded c. 1895–1910. Colonial Revival modifications were done c.1935.

== Description of the house ==
The Marsh-Warthen House was built in 1836, by Spencer Stewart Marsh and his wife, Ruth Terrell Brantley Marsh. The original house consisted of four rooms over four rooms with wide hallways running through the center of the building on both the upper and lower levels. A large porch with square columns was constructed on the south side of the house; a second-story balcony with a door from the upstairs hall was built over this porch. The original kitchen was in the basement, and food was brought up to the main level by a dumb waiter. The kitchen remained in the basement until about 1900, when the grandson of Spencer Marsh, Spencer Marsh Warthen, built a two-story wing on the northeast side of the house. The lower level of the new wing contained the kitchen and a large pantry, while the upper level was used as servants' quarters.

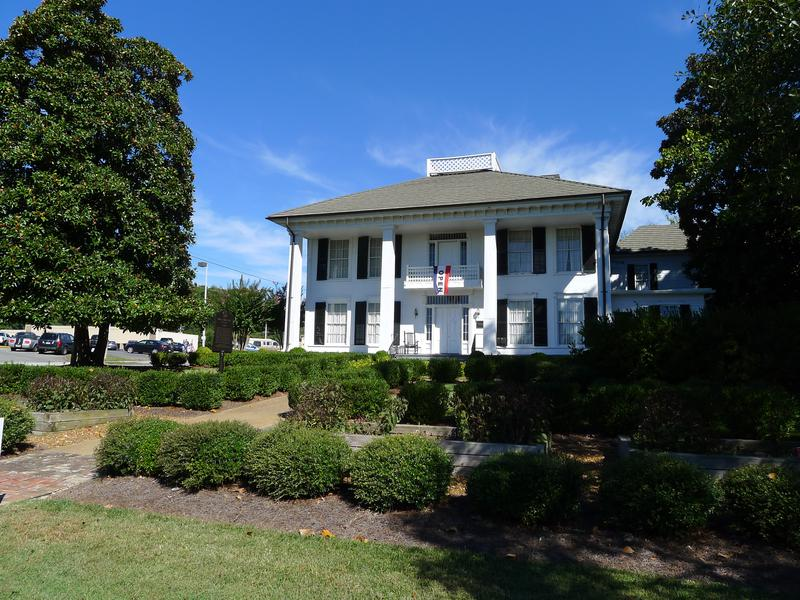
Marsh-Warthen House

The Marsh-Warthen House is an early Greek Revival-style home and is significant as an example of a Georgian-type house with original Greek Revival-style and later Colonial Revival-style details. According to Georgia's Living Places: Historic Houses in their Landscaped Settings, a statewide context, the Georgian house was popular in Georgia's towns and cities from the early years of the 19th century well into the 20th century. The Greek Revival style, which was found more often in towns and cities, was popular from the 1840s through the 1860s. The Marsh-Warthen house is thus an early example of the Greek Revival style of architecture on the Georgia frontier. It retains many of its original stylistic features including overall symmetrical massing, low hipped roof, central-hall plan, and architectural details including prominent square Doric columns and a front door surrounded by narrow sidelights and a rectangular line of transom lights above. Due to the presence of African-American slaves on the property, the early construction date of the house, and the tradition of using slave labor in the antebellum period in Georgia, it is likely that Mr. Marsh's slaves were involved in the construction of the house.

Spencer Marsh's youngest daughter, Sarah Adaline, married Nathaniel Green Warthen in 1859. After living on a plantation in McLemore's Cove (northwest of La Fayette) and retreating to the old Warthen home place in Warthen, Washington County, Georgia, during the Civil War, the Warthens and their children moved into the Marsh-Warthen House, probably about 1875, after the death of Mr. Spencer Marsh. Their son, Spencer Marsh Warthen, was responsible for the Colonial Revival elements including the roof dormers added to the house in the early 20th century and for the two additions to the house. According to Georgia's Living Places, the Colonial Revival-style elements were often simply added onto buildings of other styles. The Colonial Revival style was very popular in Georgia from the 1890s through the 1940s.

== Marsh family business ==
After settling in Northwest Georgia, Mr. Marsh established a mercantile business on the town square and acquired large tracts of farm and timber lands

In 1845, Spencer Marsh, Andrew Perry Allgood, and W.K. Briers organized the Trion Factory Company, the first cotton mill in Northwest Georgia. The mill was built on the Chattooga River about twelve miles south of La Fayette. Andrew P. Allgood, who married the eldest Marsh daughter, Mary Ann, and Spencer Marsh were some of the wealthiest men in northwest Georgia. By 1857, they each had equal interest in Trion Factory. The factory operated under the name of Marsh & Allgood by the eve of the Civil War. Today the Trion Mill operates under the name of Mount Vernon Mills.

== The Marsh family ==
Mr. Marsh was born in Chatham County, North Carolina, on November 25, 1799, and was the son of William Marsh, a soldier in the American Revolution for whom the William Marsh chapter of the Daughters of the American Revolution (in La Fayette, Georgia) is named. About 1835, Marsh moved his family to "Chattooga," Georgia. Soon after his arrival, the name of the small settlement was changed to La Fayette. In 1835, Northwest Georgia was still Cherokee territory and remained so until 1838, when the Native Americans of the area were removed and settled west of the Mississippi River. By 1835, the Cherokees were a friendly, peaceful people, and the Marsh family befriended many of them.

Ruth and Spencer Marsh reared their six children in this large, imposing house, and sometimes rented rooms to boys who wished to live in La Fayette during the week and attend Chattooga Academy, the brick school just south of the Marsh House. One of the boys who lived with the Marsh family was John B. Gordon. Years later, Gordon became a well-known and respected person in Georgia and throughout the South. During the American Civil War, Gordon served as one of Robert E. Lee's officers and was the officer Lee chose to surrender what was left of the Army of Northern Virginia. After the war, Gordon served the people of Georgia as governor and U.S. Senator.

In 1863, when the Civil War moved into Northwest Georgia, the Marsh family moved south to Cassville, Georgia, in what is today Bartow County, Georgia. General Braxton Bragg plotted his strategy for the Battle of Chickamauga (September 17–19, 1863) under an old oak tree which stood just to the south of the Marsh House in front of the Chattooga Academy. While the family was away, the house was occupied by Union troops and was a focal point during the Battle of LaFayette in June 1864. After the war, the family returned home to find that all of their furniture and household items had been taken. The floors were blood-soaked and marked with hoof prints. Many bullets were found in the outer walls of the house and there were bullet holes in the glass around the south upstairs outer door.

The house remained in the same family for more than one hundred fifty years. The last member of the family to occupy the home was Miss Addie Augusta Wert, great-granddaughter of Spencer and Ruth Marsh.

== Museum ==
The Patrick R. Clements family owned the house from 1992 to 2002 when it was purchased by the Walker County, Georgia, Historical Society. In the summer of 2003, the house was purchased by Walker County from the Walker County Historical Society. Under an agreement with the county, the Walker County Historical Society manages the building, and through the Marsh House Community Task Force (Board of Trustees), raises funds for the operation and maintenance of the building and surrounding grounds.

The Marsh House is open to the public from 1:30 until 3:30 on Thursday, Saturday, and Sunday afternoons. The Marsh House aims to serve as a major educational and cultural institution in Northwest Georgia and the greater Chattanooga area by providing in-depth tours led by trained interpreters, by offering historically accurate reenactments, by working with local schools to offer curriculum-targeted instructional experiences, and by hosting exhibits and events which promote understanding of Northwest Georgia's diverse peoples and history. More than 10,000 persons visit the house and grounds each year, many as a continuation of their visit to the Chickamauga and Chattanooga National Military Park, which is only 12 miles away.

The Marsh House Museum Board also manages the Chattooga Academy for educational programs across the lawn which Spencer Marsh helped to found and which is the oldest brick school house in Georgia.

== Significance of the Marsh-Warthen House ==
The house is significant in the area of European settlement of North America. In the 18th and early 19th centuries, the Cherokee Nation included the area that would become Walker County. The Georgia Land Lottery of 1832 followed by the removal of the Cherokee by the federal government opened the area to white settlement. Spencer Marsh moved his family to La Fayette c.1835 from Newton County, Georgia, and became one of the pioneers of the county. During the early years of his life on the frontier, Mr. Marsh had many dealings with his Cherokee neighbors and was given the name Estachee by the Cherokee Indians. Marsh House history notes that one of his servants at the Marsh House, Ninatoya, was a Cherokee woman who was forced west on the Trail of Tears in the late 1830s. The home he built c. 1836-1837 is one of the few surviving houses from that period of early white settlement.

The Marsh-Warthen House is important to an understanding of social and cultural history due to Spencer Marsh's efforts to promote the welfare of the La Fayette area. As a community and business leader in La Fayette and Walker County, Marsh encouraged progress in the economic, educational, and religious life of the community. In addition to his influence as a local merchant Mr. Marsh helped organize the Trion Factory (in Chattooga County, south of La Fayette) in 1845, the first cotton mill in northwest Georgia. He served as an Inferior Court justice and as a state senator. He also donated the land for the Chattooga Academy (located just south of the Marsh-Warthen House and listed in the National Register on February 15, 1980) and served as a trustee for the academy and for the La Fayette Female Academy established soon thereafter. Mr. Marsh was an active member and major funder of the First Baptist Church of La Fayette, where his family and slaves attended. The Marsh household was a typical wealthy Southern household during the mid-19th century. The family coexisted and interacted closely with the African-American slaves who lived on the property and later with the African-American servants who lived in the main house. Spencer Marsh was thus a prominent local example of the kind of enterprising pioneer who helped settle Georgia's westward-moving frontier during the late 18th and early 19th Centuries through his contributions to the developing community's social, economic, and cultural life.
