= Meridian campaign order of battle: Confederate =

Confederate States of America order of battle

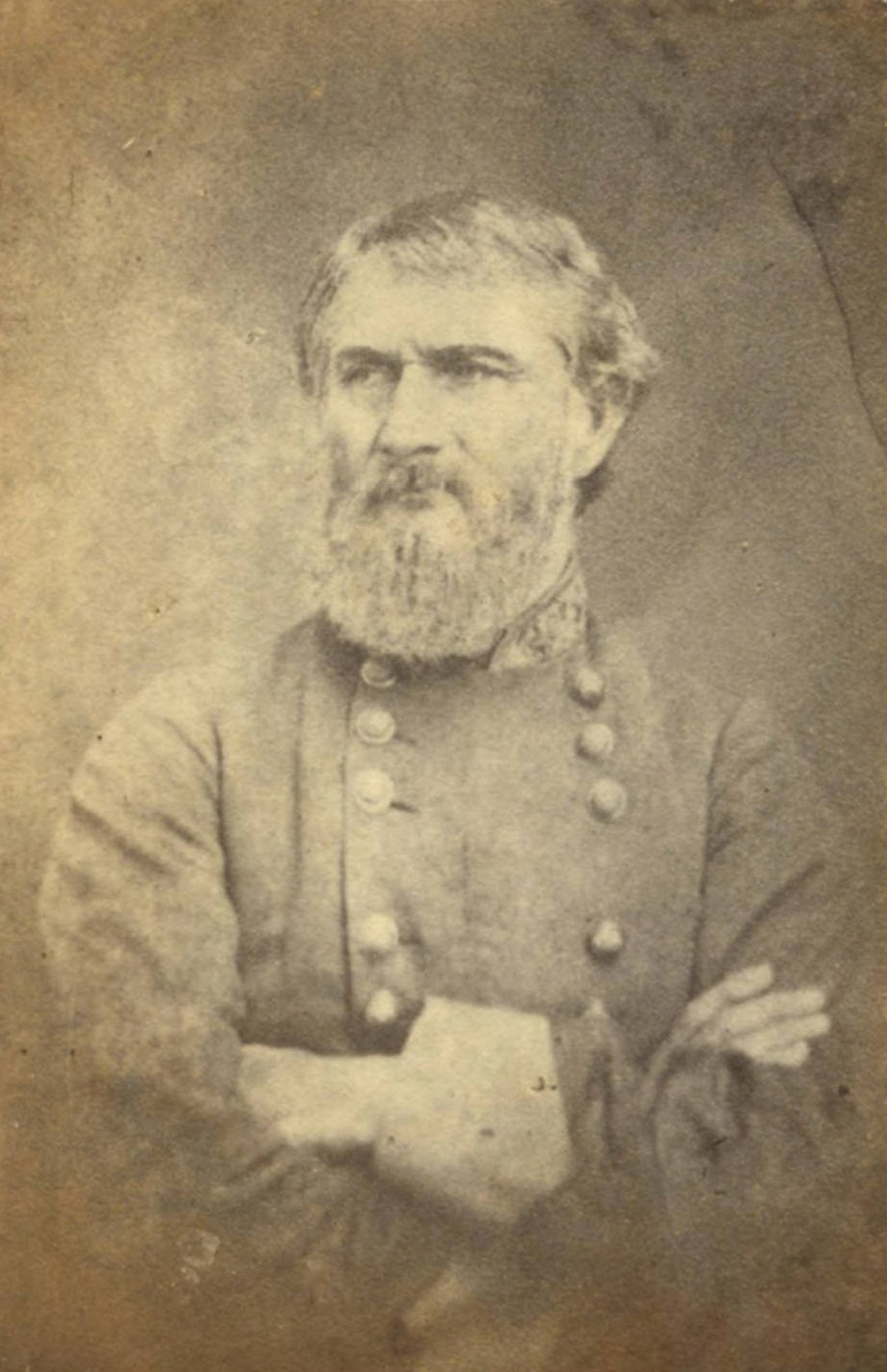
Lt. Gen. Leonidas Polk led the Confederate forces that opposed the Meridian expedition. He withdrew his infantry into Alabama without any major fighting.

The following Confederate States Army units and commanders fought in the Meridian campaign (3 February – 6 March 1864) during the American Civil War. Order of battle was compiled from the army organization during the campaign. The strength numbers listed in the tables are "present for duty".

== Abbreviations used ==
=== Military rank ===
- LTG = Lieutenant General
- MG = Major General
- BG = Brigadier General
- Col = Colonel
- Ltc = Lieutenant Colonel
- Maj = Major
- Cpt = Captain
- Lt = Lieutenant

=== Other ===
- w = wounded
- mw = mortally wounded
- k = killed

== Department of Alabama, Mississippi and East Louisiana ==
LTG Leonidas Polk

- Escort: Louisiana Company: Lt P. M. Kenner
- General staff and escort: 5 officers, 44 men

=== Infantry corps ===
Confederate order of battle for Polk's infantry corps
Division	Brigade	Unit
Loring's Division; MG William Wing Loring; 548 officers 5,375 men 18 guns	Featherston's Brigade; BG Winfield S. Featherston	3rd Mississippi Infantry Regiment: Col T. A. Mellon
Loring's Division; MG William Wing Loring; 548 officers 5,375 men 18 guns	Featherston's Brigade; BG Winfield S. Featherston	22nd Mississippi Infantry Regiment: Ltc H. J. Reid
Loring's Division; MG William Wing Loring; 548 officers 5,375 men 18 guns	Featherston's Brigade; BG Winfield S. Featherston	31st Mississippi Infantry Regiment: Ltc M. D. L. Stephens
Loring's Division; MG William Wing Loring; 548 officers 5,375 men 18 guns	Featherston's Brigade; BG Winfield S. Featherston	33rd Mississippi Infantry Regiment: Ltc J. L. Drake
Loring's Division; MG William Wing Loring; 548 officers 5,375 men 18 guns	Featherston's Brigade; BG Winfield S. Featherston	1st Mississippi Sharpshooters Battalion: Maj James M. Stigler
Loring's Division; MG William Wing Loring; 548 officers 5,375 men 18 guns	Featherston's Brigade; BG Winfield S. Featherston	Charpentier's Alabama Battery: Cpt Stephen Charpentier
Loring's Division; MG William Wing Loring; 548 officers 5,375 men 18 guns	Adams' Brigade; BG John Adams	1st Confederate Battalion: Ltc George H. Forney
Loring's Division; MG William Wing Loring; 548 officers 5,375 men 18 guns	Adams' Brigade; BG John Adams	6th Mississippi Infantry Regiment: Col Robert Lowry
Loring's Division; MG William Wing Loring; 548 officers 5,375 men 18 guns	Adams' Brigade; BG John Adams	14th Mississippi Infantry Regiment: Ltc W. L. Doss
Loring's Division; MG William Wing Loring; 548 officers 5,375 men 18 guns	Adams' Brigade; BG John Adams	15th Mississippi Infantry Regiment: Col M. Farrell
Loring's Division; MG William Wing Loring; 548 officers 5,375 men 18 guns	Adams' Brigade; BG John Adams	20th Mississippi Infantry Regiment: Col William N. Brown
Loring's Division; MG William Wing Loring; 548 officers 5,375 men 18 guns	Adams' Brigade; BG John Adams	26th Mississippi Infantry Regiment: Col Arthur E. Reynolds
Loring's Division; MG William Wing Loring; 548 officers 5,375 men 18 guns	Adams' Brigade; BG John Adams	Lookout Tennessee Artillery: Cpt Robert L. Barry
Loring's Division; MG William Wing Loring; 548 officers 5,375 men 18 guns	Buford's Brigade; BG Abraham Buford II	27th Alabama Infantry Regiment: Col James Jackson
Loring's Division; MG William Wing Loring; 548 officers 5,375 men 18 guns	Buford's Brigade; BG Abraham Buford II	35th Alabama Infantry Regiment: Col Samuel S. Ives
Loring's Division; MG William Wing Loring; 548 officers 5,375 men 18 guns	Buford's Brigade; BG Abraham Buford II	54th Alabama Infantry Regiment: Col Alpheus Baker
Loring's Division; MG William Wing Loring; 548 officers 5,375 men 18 guns	Buford's Brigade; BG Abraham Buford II	55th Alabama Infantry Regiment: Col John Snodgrass
Loring's Division; MG William Wing Loring; 548 officers 5,375 men 18 guns	Buford's Brigade; BG Abraham Buford II	9th Arkansas Infantry Regiment: Col Isaac L. Dunlop
Loring's Division; MG William Wing Loring; 548 officers 5,375 men 18 guns	Buford's Brigade; BG Abraham Buford II	3rd Kentucky Infantry Regiment: Col A. P. Thompson
Loring's Division; MG William Wing Loring; 548 officers 5,375 men 18 guns	Buford's Brigade; BG Abraham Buford II	7th Kentucky Infantry Regiment: Col Edward Crossland
Loring's Division; MG William Wing Loring; 548 officers 5,375 men 18 guns	Buford's Brigade; BG Abraham Buford II	8th Kentucky Infantry Regiment: Ltc A. R. Shacklett
Loring's Division; MG William Wing Loring; 548 officers 5,375 men 18 guns	Buford's Brigade; BG Abraham Buford II	12th Louisiana Infantry Regiment: Col Thomas M. Scott
Loring's Division; MG William Wing Loring; 548 officers 5,375 men 18 guns	Buford's Brigade; BG Abraham Buford II	Pointe Coupee Artillery: Cpt Alcide Bouanchaud
Loring's Division; MG William Wing Loring; 548 officers 5,375 men 18 guns	Artillery (Note: Loring reported having four batteries, but only specified the names of three. According to the Official Records, the fourth battery was probably Cowan's (Official Records, p. 332).)	Cowan's Mississippi Battery: Cpt J. J. Cowan
French's Division; MG Samuel Gibbs French; 248 officers 2,442 men 8 guns	Ector's Brigade; BG Mathew Ector	29th North Carolina Infantry Regiment: Cpt W. W. Rollins
French's Division; MG Samuel Gibbs French; 248 officers 2,442 men 8 guns	Ector's Brigade; BG Mathew Ector	9th Texas Infantry Regiment: Col William Hugh Young
French's Division; MG Samuel Gibbs French; 248 officers 2,442 men 8 guns	Ector's Brigade; BG Mathew Ector	10th Texas Cavalry Regiment (dismounted): Col C. R. Earp
French's Division; MG Samuel Gibbs French; 248 officers 2,442 men 8 guns	Ector's Brigade; BG Mathew Ector	14th Texas Cavalry Regiment (dismounted): Col John Lafayette Camp
French's Division; MG Samuel Gibbs French; 248 officers 2,442 men 8 guns	Ector's Brigade; BG Mathew Ector	32nd Texas Cavalry Regiment (dismounted): Cpt Nathan Anderson
French's Division; MG Samuel Gibbs French; 248 officers 2,442 men 8 guns	Cockrell's Brigade; BG Francis M. Cockrell	1st and 4th Missouri Infantry Regiment: Col A. C. Riley
French's Division; MG Samuel Gibbs French; 248 officers 2,442 men 8 guns	Cockrell's Brigade; BG Francis M. Cockrell	2nd and 6th Missouri Infantry Regiment: Col P. C. Flournoy
French's Division; MG Samuel Gibbs French; 248 officers 2,442 men 8 guns	Cockrell's Brigade; BG Francis M. Cockrell	3rd and 5th Missouri Infantry Regiment: Col James McCown
French's Division; MG Samuel Gibbs French; 248 officers 2,442 men 8 guns	Cockrell's Brigade; BG Francis M. Cockrell	1st and 3rd Missouri Cavalry Regiment (dismounted): Col Elijah Gates
French's Division; MG Samuel Gibbs French; 248 officers 2,442 men 8 guns	Artillery (Note: French's official return omitted the artillery batteries. According to the Official Records, these probably were Hoskins' and Walsh's (Official Records, p. 333).)	Hoskins' Mississippi Battery: Cpt J. A. Hoskins
French's Division; MG Samuel Gibbs French; 248 officers 2,442 men 8 guns	Artillery	Wade's Missouri Battery: Lt Richard Walsh (Note: Cpt Henry Guibor led the Missouri battery during the Atlanta campaign. It was in the same battalion as Hoskins' Battery and Cpt John Ward's Alabama Battery. (Battles & Leaders, p. 292))

=== Cavalry corps ===
MG Stephen D. Lee

- Escort: Georgia Company: Cpt T. M. Nelson
- Strength: 652 officers, 7,685 men, no. guns not reported

Confederate order of battle for Lee's cavalry corps
Division	Brigade	Unit
Jackson's Division; BG William Hicks Jackson	1st Brigade; Col Peter Burwell Starke	1st Mississippi Cavalry Regiment: Col R. A. Pinson
Jackson's Division; BG William Hicks Jackson	1st Brigade; Col Peter Burwell Starke	28th Mississippi Cavalry Regiment: Col Peter Burwell Starke
Jackson's Division; BG William Hicks Jackson	1st Brigade; Col Peter Burwell Starke	Ballentine's Mississippi Cavalry Regiment: Col John Goff Ballentine
Jackson's Division; BG William Hicks Jackson	1st Brigade; Col Peter Burwell Starke	(Escort) Louisiana Company: Cpt Junius Y. Webb
Jackson's Division; BG William Hicks Jackson	1st Brigade; Col Peter Burwell Starke	Columbus (Georgia) Light Artillery: Cpt Edward Croft
Jackson's Division; BG William Hicks Jackson	2nd Brigade; Col Lawrence Sullivan Ross	3rd Texas Cavalry Regiment: Col H.P. Mabry
Jackson's Division; BG William Hicks Jackson	2nd Brigade; Col Lawrence Sullivan Ross	6th Texas Cavalry Regiment: Col Jack Wharton
Jackson's Division; BG William Hicks Jackson	2nd Brigade; Col Lawrence Sullivan Ross	9th Texas Cavalry Regiment: Col Dudley W. Jones
Jackson's Division; BG William Hicks Jackson	2nd Brigade; Col Lawrence Sullivan Ross	27th Texas Cavalry Regiment: Col Edward R. Hawkins
Jackson's Division; BG William Hicks Jackson	2nd Brigade; Col Lawrence Sullivan Ross	(Escort) Texas Company: Rush L. Elkin
Jackson's Division; BG William Hicks Jackson	2nd Brigade; Col Lawrence Sullivan Ross	King's Missouri Battery: Cpt Houston King
Jackson's Division; BG William Hicks Jackson	Adams' Brigade; BG William Wirt Adams	11th Arkansas Cavalry Regiment: Col John Griffith
Jackson's Division; BG William Hicks Jackson	Adams' Brigade; BG William Wirt Adams	14th Confederate Cavalry Regiment: Cpt Josephus R. Quin
Jackson's Division; BG William Hicks Jackson	Adams' Brigade; BG William Wirt Adams	9th Louisiana Cavalry Battalion: Cpt E. A. Scott
Jackson's Division; BG William Hicks Jackson	Adams' Brigade; BG William Wirt Adams	Harris' Mississippi Cavalry Battalion: Maj J. L. Harris
Jackson's Division; BG William Hicks Jackson	Adams' Brigade; BG William Wirt Adams	4th Mississippi Cavalry Regiment: Maj T. R. Stockdale
Jackson's Division; BG William Hicks Jackson	Adams' Brigade; BG William Wirt Adams	Adams' Mississippi Cavalry Regiment: Col Robert C. Wood Jr.
Jackson's Division; BG William Hicks Jackson	Adams' Brigade; BG William Wirt Adams	9th Tennessee Cavalry Battalion: Maj James H. Akin
Jackson's Division; BG William Hicks Jackson	Adams' Brigade; BG William Wirt Adams	Roberts' Mississippi Battery: Cpt Calvit Roberts
Jackson's Division; BG William Hicks Jackson	Ferguson's Brigade; BG Samuel W. Ferguson	2nd Alabama Cavalry Regiment: Col R. G. Earle
Jackson's Division; BG William Hicks Jackson	Ferguson's Brigade; BG Samuel W. Ferguson	56th Alabama Cavalry Regiment: Col William Boyles
Jackson's Division; BG William Hicks Jackson	Ferguson's Brigade; BG Samuel W. Ferguson	12th Mississippi Cavalry Battalion: Maj William M. Inge
Jackson's Division; BG William Hicks Jackson	Ferguson's Brigade; BG Samuel W. Ferguson	2nd Tennessee Cavalry Regiment (Barteau's): Ltc George H. Morton
Jackson's Division; BG William Hicks Jackson	Ferguson's Brigade; BG Samuel W. Ferguson	Waties' South Carolina Battery: Cpt John Waties
Chalmers' Division; BG James R. Chalmers	1st Brigade; Col William F. Slemons	2nd Arkansas Cavalry Regiment (Slemons'): Col W. F. Slemons
Chalmers' Division; BG James R. Chalmers	1st Brigade; Col William F. Slemons	3rd Mississippi Cavalry Regiment: Col John McGuirk
Chalmers' Division; BG James R. Chalmers	1st Brigade; Col William F. Slemons	5th Mississippi Cavalry Regiment: Lt. Col. James A. Barksdale (mw)
Chalmers' Division; BG James R. Chalmers	1st Brigade; Col William F. Slemons	7th Tennessee Cavalry Regiment: Col William L. Duckworth
Chalmers' Division; BG James R. Chalmers	1st Brigade; Col William F. Slemons	McLendon's Mississippi Battery: Cpt J. M. McLendon
Chalmers' Division; BG James R. Chalmers	2nd Brigade; Col Robert McCulloch	1st Mississippi Partisan Rangers: Ltc L. B. Hovis
Chalmers' Division; BG James R. Chalmers	2nd Brigade; Col Robert McCulloch	18th Mississippi Cavalry Battalion: Ltc Alexander H. Chalmers
Chalmers' Division; BG James R. Chalmers	2nd Brigade; Col Robert McCulloch	19th Mississippi Cavalry Battalion: Ltc William L. Duff
Chalmers' Division; BG James R. Chalmers	2nd Brigade; Col Robert McCulloch	2nd Missouri Cavalry Regiment: Col Robert McCulloch
Chalmers' Division; BG James R. Chalmers	2nd Brigade; Col Robert McCulloch	Buckner Mississippi Battery: Lt H. C. Holt

== Notes ==
Footnotes

Citations
