= Spencer Marsh =

Spencer Marsh may refer to:

- Spencer M. Marsh (1864–1932), Wisconsin State Senator
- Spencer S. Marsh (fl. 1830–1875), judge and North Carolina State Senator
