= Louis Douglas Watkins =

Soldier in the Union Army during the American Civil War

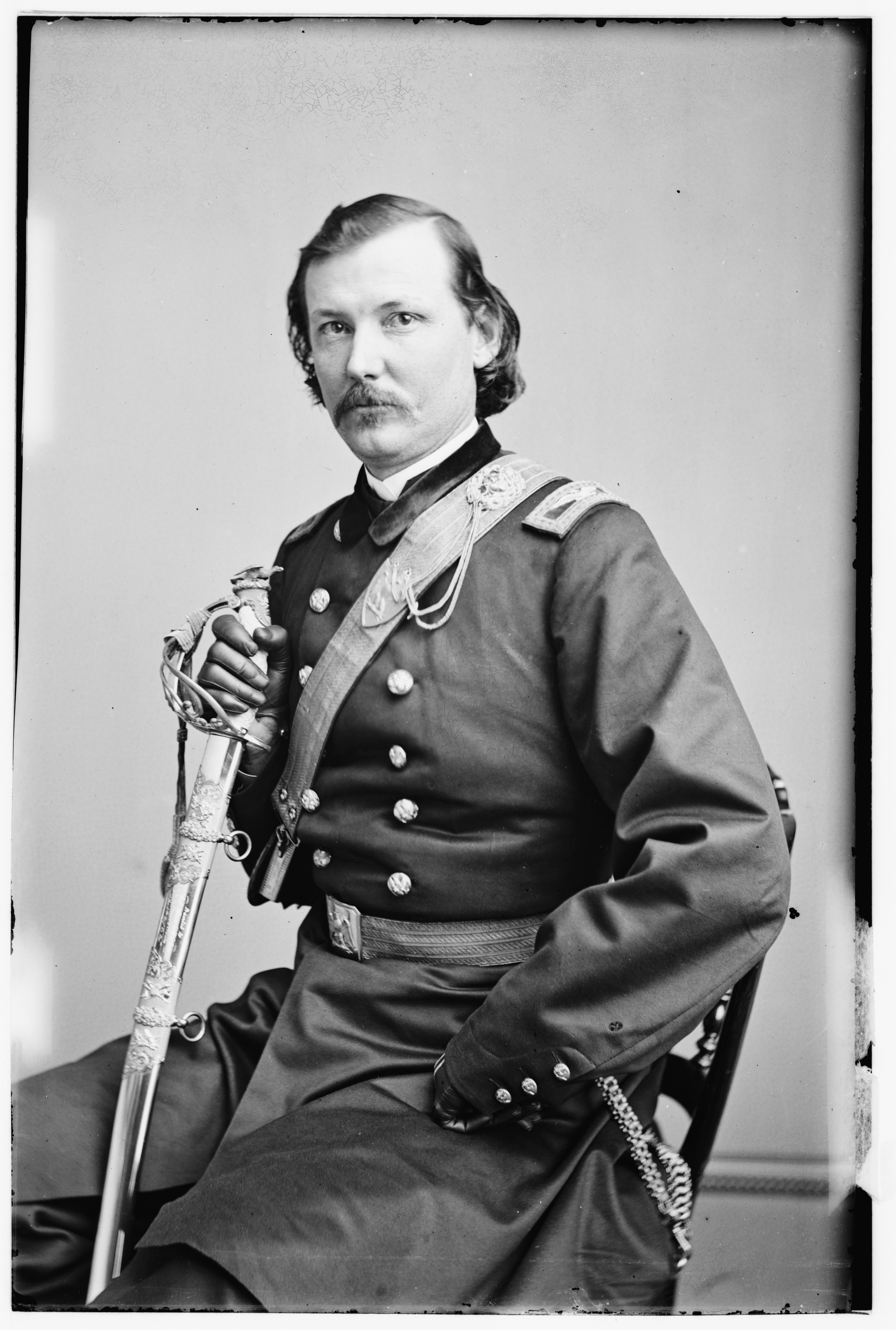
- Gen. L. D. Watkins (1865–68)
- Born: c. 1835; Florida
- Died: March 29, 1868; Louisiana
- Spouse: Mary E. Rousseau (m. 1864)
- Children: ~ 2
- Military career
- Allegiance: Union
- Branch: Union Army
- Rank: Brigadier general
- Battles: American Civil War; Peninsular Campaign; Battle of Gaines' Mill (WIA); Tullahoma Campaign; Battle of Thompson's Station; Atlanta campaign; Battle of Resaca; Battle of LaFayette

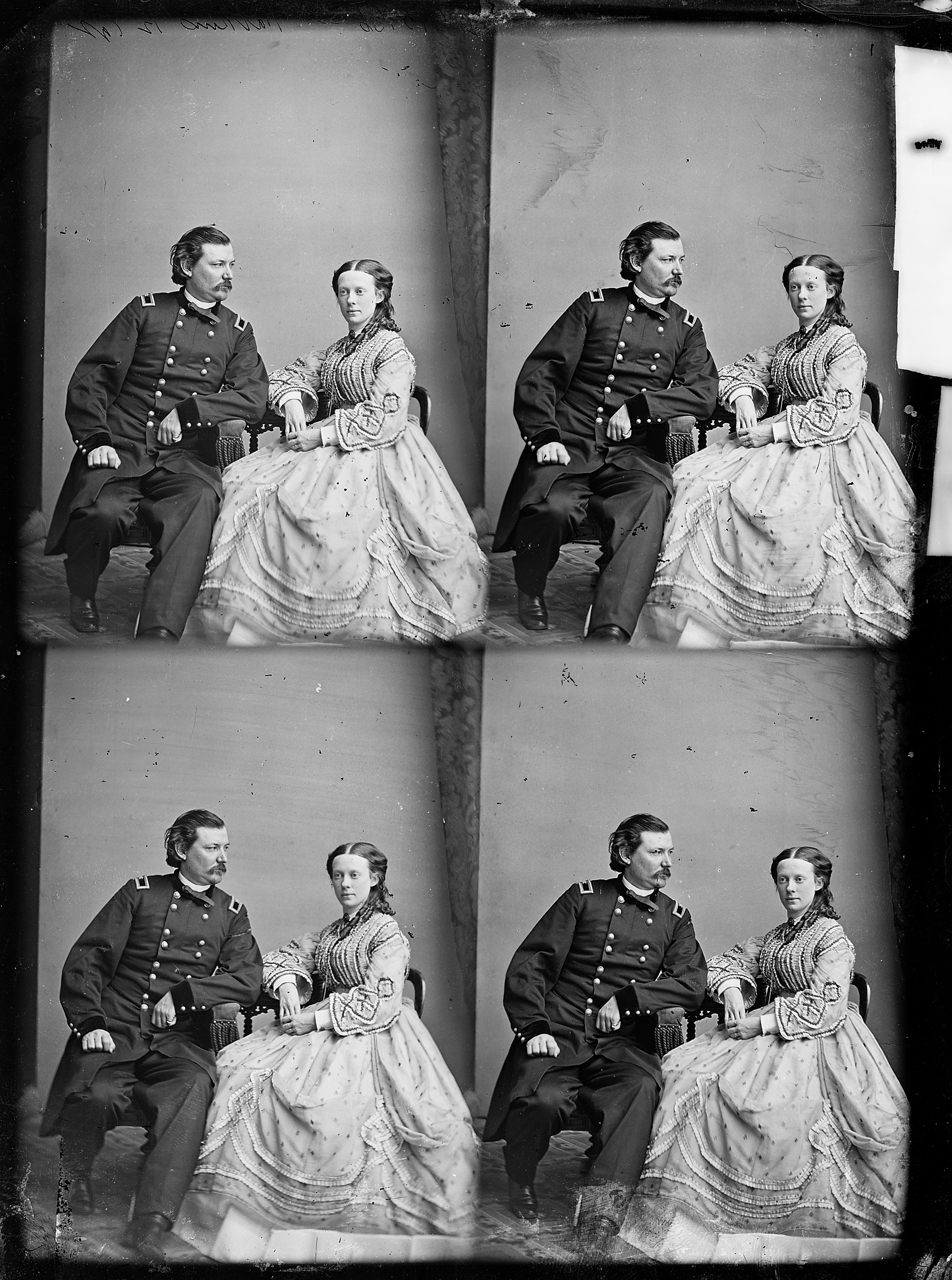
Gen. Louis D. Watkins and wife (c. 1864–65)

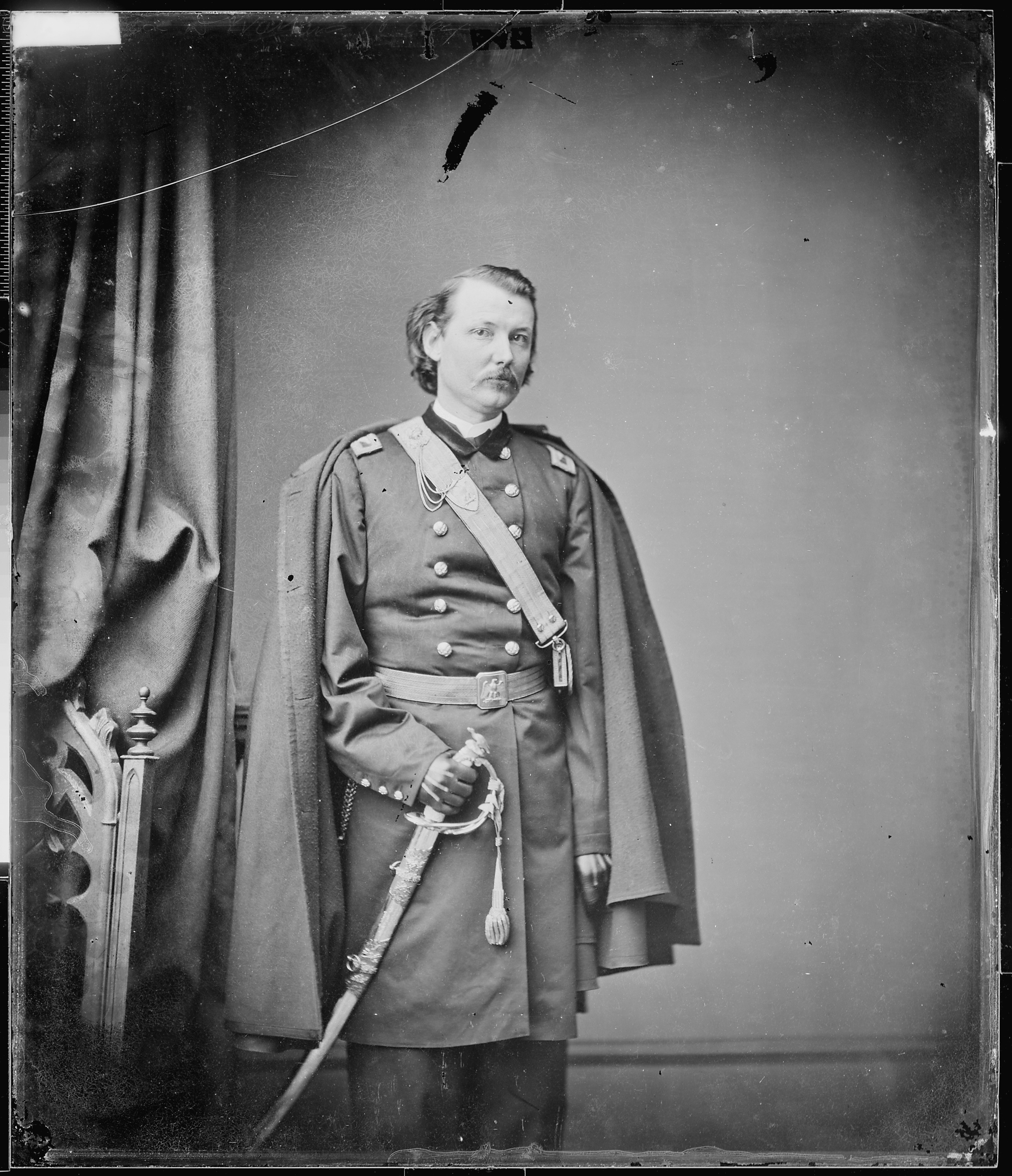
Gen. Louis D. Watkins (c. 1860–65)

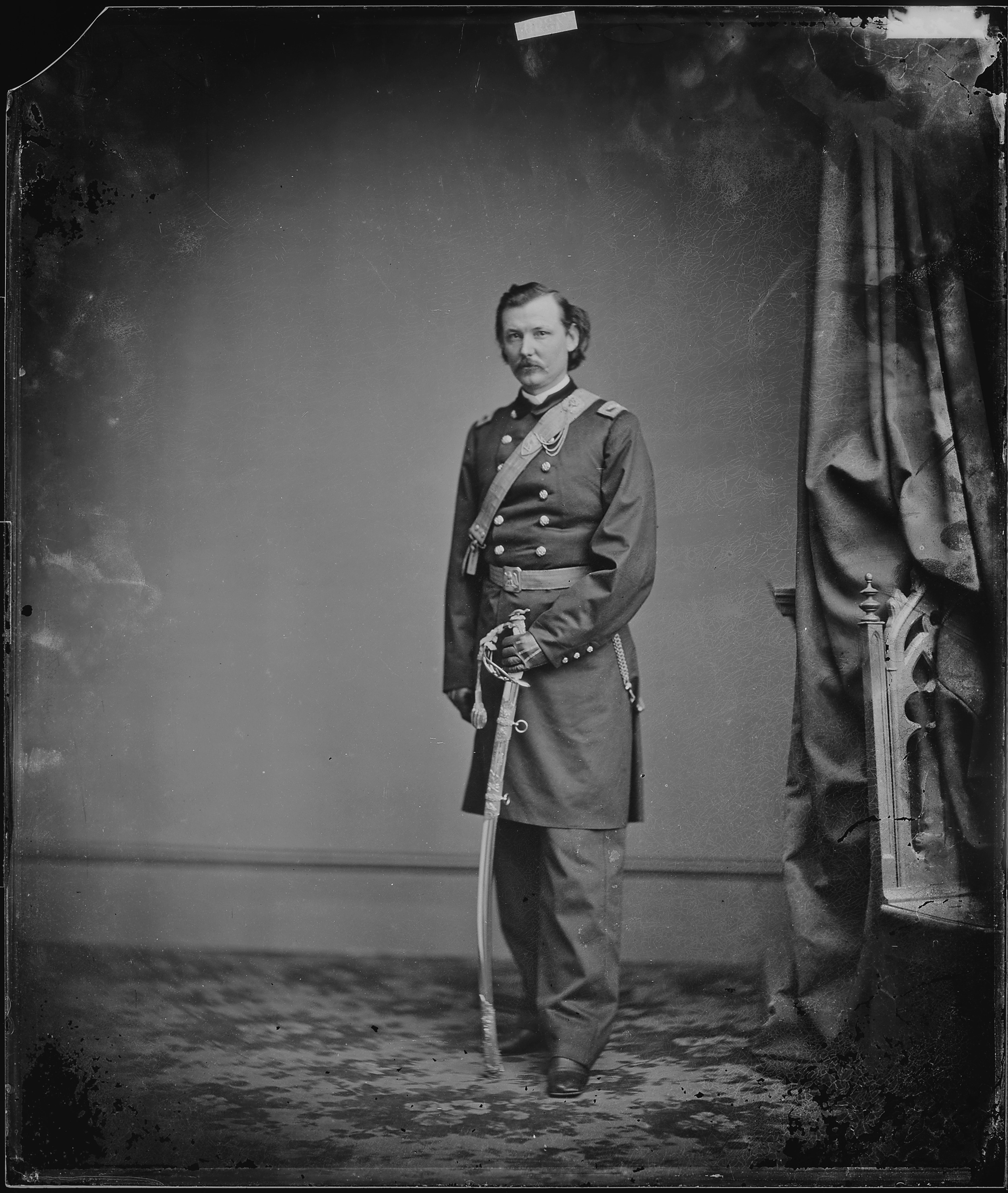
Gen. Louis D. Watkins (c. 1860–65)

Louis Douglas Watkins (c. 1835–1868) was a soldier in the Union Army during the American Civil War.

== Early life ==
Louis Douglas Watkins was born in the state of Florida, about 1835, but in early life took up his residence in the District of Columbia, where he was living at the time of the outbreak of the Civil War.

== Military career ==
On April 15, 1861, Watkins enlisted as a private in Company A, 3rd District of Columbia Infantry Battalion; was commissioned first lieutenant in the 14th United States Infantry, May 14; was transferred to the 2nd United States Cavalry, June 22, and to the 5th United States Cavalry, August 3. He engaged with that regiment in McClellan's Peninsular Campaign and was severely wounded at the Battle of Gaines' Mill.

He was commissioned captain on July 17, 1862, was on mustering and disbursing duty at Cincinnati, Ohio, and aide-de-camp on the staff of General A. J. Smith during the invasion of Kentucky by the Confederates. He was then appointed chief of cavalry in the Army of Kentucky and engaged in General Carter's raid to East Tennessee in December 1862.

On February 1, 1863, he was commissioned colonel of the 6th Kentucky Cavalry, then stationed at Nashville, and on the staff of General Granger engaged in skirmishes against the Confederates in Tennessee, commanding a brigade in the defeat of the Confederate General Wharton.

He commanded the 3rd Brigade, 1st Division, Army of the Cumberland, until September, 1863, and was engaged in guarding the railroad in the Atlanta Campaign, defeating the Confederates in the Battle of LaFayette, Georgia.

He was engaged in holding Resaca against the Confederate General Hood, and with the Army of the Tennessee participated in the pursuit of Hood's army, commanding the 1st Cavalry Division.

Later he commanded the post of Louisville, Kentucky. He was brevet brevetted brigadier general of volunteers June 23, 1864; was brevetted major United States Army, for gallant and meritorious conduct in the defense of Resaca, Georgia; lieutenant colonel, United States Army, for gallant and meritorious services at the battles of Lafayette and Thompson's Station, and colonel and brigadier general, United States Army, for gallant and meritorious services in the expedition to East Tennessee under Major General Samuel P. Carter.

Watkins was promoted to Brigadier General of United States Volunteers with rank from September 25, 1865; and was mustered out of the volunteers in September 1866. Meanwhile he had been commissioned lieutenant colonel of the 20th United States Infantry in July 1866, and was stationed at the posts of Baton Rouge and New Orleans, Louisiana.

== Personal life ==
Watkins was married to Mary E. Rousseau, daughter of Major General Rousseau, in Jefferson County, Kentucky, on August 4, 1864.

He died at either Baton Rouge or New Orleans, on March 29, 1868, after a very short illness. He was survived by his wife and two young children.

== Ranks ==
Watkins joined the United States Army as first lieutenant of the 14th Infantry on May 14, 1861, was transferred to the 5th Cavalry on June 22, 1861, and became captain on July 17, 1862, and lieutenant-colonel of the 20th Infantry on July 28, 1866.

He received the following brevets: major, on January 8, 1863, for gallant service in the expedition to East Tennessee under General Samuel P. Carter; lieutenant colonel, on June 24, 1864, for service at Lafayette; brigadier general, on March 13, 1865. He was mustered out on September 1, 1866.

- First lieutenant in the 14th United States Volunteer Infantry Regiment on May 14, 1861.
- First lieutenant and captain in the 5th United States Volunteer Cavalry Regiment from June 22, 1861, to c. 1863.
- Colonel of the 6th Kentucky Volunteer Cavalry Regiment from February 1, 1863.
- Brevetted brigadier general on June 24, 1864.

== See also ==
- List of American Civil War generals (Union)

== Sources ==
- Heitman, Francis B. (1903). "Watkins, Louis Douglas". Historical Register and Dictionary of the United States Army, From Its Organization, September 29, 1789, to March 2, 1903. Vol. 1. Washington, D.C.: Government Printing Office. p. 1008.
- Karcheski, Walter J., Jr. (February 2004). "'This richly mounted sword': the presentation sword of Colonel Louis D. Watkins". Apollo, 159(504): pp. 44 ff.
- Wilson, J. G.; Fiske, J., eds. (1889). "Watkins, Louis Douglas". Appletons' Cyclopædia of American Biography. Vol. 6. New York: D. Appleton. p. 388.
- "Watkins, Louis D.". The Union Army: A History of Military Affairs in the Loyal States, 1861–65. Vol. 8. Madison, WI: Federal Publishing Company, 1908. pp. 292–293.
- Eicher, John H. and David J. (2001). Civil War High Commands. Stanford, CA: Stanford University Press. ISBN 0-8047-3641-3.
- "Louis Douglass Watkins". Civil War Governors of Kentucky. Kentucky Historical Society, National Archives. Retrieved 28 May 2022.
- "Obituary". New Orleans Republican. April 4, 1868. p. 2.
- "Summary of News". The Times-Democrat. April 1, 1868. p. 4.
