= Lafayette Presbyterian Church (Georgia) =

Presbyterian church in Lafayette, Georgia

Lafayette Presbyterian Church in Lafayette, Georgia was founded on August 12, 1835, as Ebenezer Church in the town then named Chattooga, Georgia, the county seat of Walker County, Georgia. The town changed its name briefly to Benton, Georgia and then in December 1836 to Lafayette, Georgia, in honor of Gilbert du Motier, Marquis de Lafayette, a French aristocrat and military officer who joined the Continental Army, led by George Washington, during the American Revolutionary War. Lafayette eventually was appointed a major general. In 1841, the Ebenezer church was renamed LaFayette Presbyterian Church.

On June 24, 1864, during the Atlanta campaign of the American Civil War, a battle was fought in LaFayette. LaFayette Presbyterian Church was used as a field hospital during and following the battle for both Union and Confederate soldiers. Church records which were destroyed during the war were rewritten by surviving church elders in 1865. Over the years through 2024, the church has been repaired and rebricked and the facilities significantly enlarged and expanded.

== Citations ==
34°42′21.6″N 85°16′56.3″W / 34.706000°N 85.282306°W / 34.706000; -85.282306
