= Meridian campaign order of battle =

The order of battle for the Meridian campaign includes:

- Meridian campaign order of battle: Confederate
- Meridian campaign order of battle: Union
