= 16th Confederate Cavalry Regiment =

Cavalry regiment of the Confederate States Army

16th Confederate Cavalry Regiment 12th Mississippi Cavalry Regiment
- Active: 1863–1865
- Country: Confederate States
- Branch: Confederate States Army
- Type: Cavalry
- Size: Regiment
- Engagements: American Civil War: Battle of LaFayette; Mobile Campaign

The 16th Confederate Cavalry Regiment, also known as the 12th Mississippi Cavalry Regiment and Armistead's Regiment, was a cavalry unit of the Confederate States Army during the American Civil War. The regiment took part in the 1864 Atlanta Campaign, then was assigned to guard the vicinity of Mobile, Alabama during the final stages of the war before surrendering in May, 1865.

== History ==
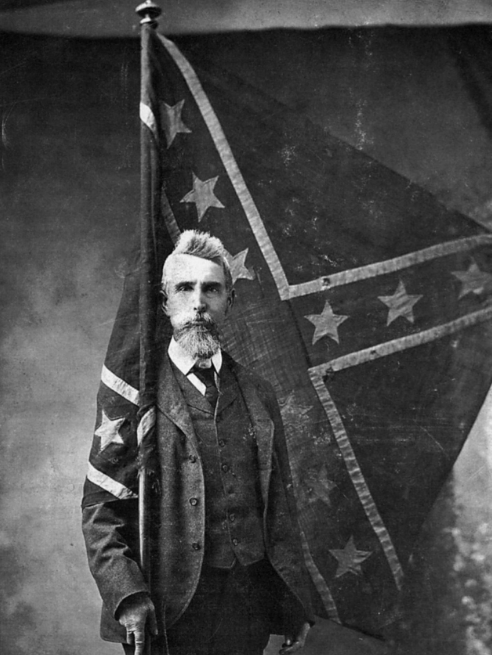
Silas Buck, color bearer of the 16th Confederate Cavalry.

The 16th Confederate Cavalry Regiment originated as a group of Mississippi and Alabama cavalry and partisan ranger companies that were consolidated into one regiment in late 1863. The predecessor units included Captain S.W. Red's Company of partisan rangers, Baxter's Scouts, Captain C.A. Mann's company, and units from the Mississippi State Troops cavalry. The commanding officer, Colonel Charles G. Armistead, was a veteran of the 15th Mississippi Infantry and the state troops cavalry. As a unit made up of soldiers from multiple states, the regiment was designated the 16th Confederate Cavalry, but it was also commonly referred to in military correspondence as "Armistead's Regiment", and was renamed as the 12th Mississippi Cavalry in March 1865, with the Alabama companies detached at that time. Another unrelated unit, led by Colonel William Inge, is incorrectly referred to as the 12th Mississippi Cavalry Regiment in some sources, but that unit's correct designation was the 12th Battalion.

Armistead's Regiment was assigned to the brigade of General Gideon Pillow and sent to Selma, Alabama in May, 1864. During the Atlanta Campaign, the regiment fought at the Battle of LaFayette on June 24, taking part in an unsuccessful Confederate attempt to cut Union general William T. Sherman's lines of communication. The regiment suffered 12 killed and 13 wounded at Lafayette; Colonel Armistead was wounded and briefly captured during the battle but escaped. Following this defeat, the regiment retreated to Alabama.

In November 1864, Colonel Armistead was in command of a cavalry brigade made up of his regiment along with the 8th Alabama and three Alabama battalions. Assigned to guard the Gulf Coast region, Armistead's brigade skirmished with Union troops in December near the Alabama-Florida border. In the final months of the war, Armistead's brigade was assigned to Abraham Buford's Alabama division of Forrest's Cavalry Corps in February, 1865. The regiment took part in the Battle of Spanish Fort as Union troops approached Mobile during their final offensive in the Gulf coast region, and covered the rearguard of the Confederate evacuation of Mobile. The regiment surrendered with General Richard Taylor's forces at Citronelle, Alabama, on May 4, 1865.

== Commanders ==
Commanders of the 16th Confederate Cavalry Regiment:

- Colonel Charles G. Armistead, wounded at Lafayette, Georgia, 1864.
- Lieutenant Colonel Philip B. Spence

== See also ==
- List of Confederate Government units in the American Civil War
- List of Confederate units from Mississippi in the American Civil War
