= Senator Marsh =

Senator Marsh may refer to:

- Christine Marsh (fl. 2020s), Arizona State Senate
- Daniel G. Marsh (born 1937), Washington State Senate
- Del Marsh (born 1956), Alabama State Senate
- Gordon F. Marsh (1908–1982), Virginia State Senate
- Henry L. Marsh (1933–2025), Virginia State Senate
- Shirley Marsh (1925–2014), Nebraska State Senate
- Spencer M. Marsh (1864–1932), Wisconsin State Senate
- Spencer S. Marsh (died 1875), North Carolina State Senate
