= 66th Indiana Infantry Regiment =

66th Regiment Indiana Infantry
- Active: August 19, 1862 – June 3, 1865
- Country: United States
- Allegiance: Union
- Branch: Infantry
- Engagements: Battle of Richmond; First Battle of Collierville; Atlanta campaign Battle of Resaca; Battle of Dallas; Battle of New Hope Church; Battle of Allatoona; Battle of Kennesaw Mountain; Battle of Atlanta; Siege of Atlanta; Battle of Jonesboro; Battle of Lovejoy's Station; Sherman's March to the Sea; Carolinas campaign Battle of Bentonville

The 66th Regiment Indiana Infantry was an infantry regiment that served in the Union Army during the American Civil War.

== Service ==
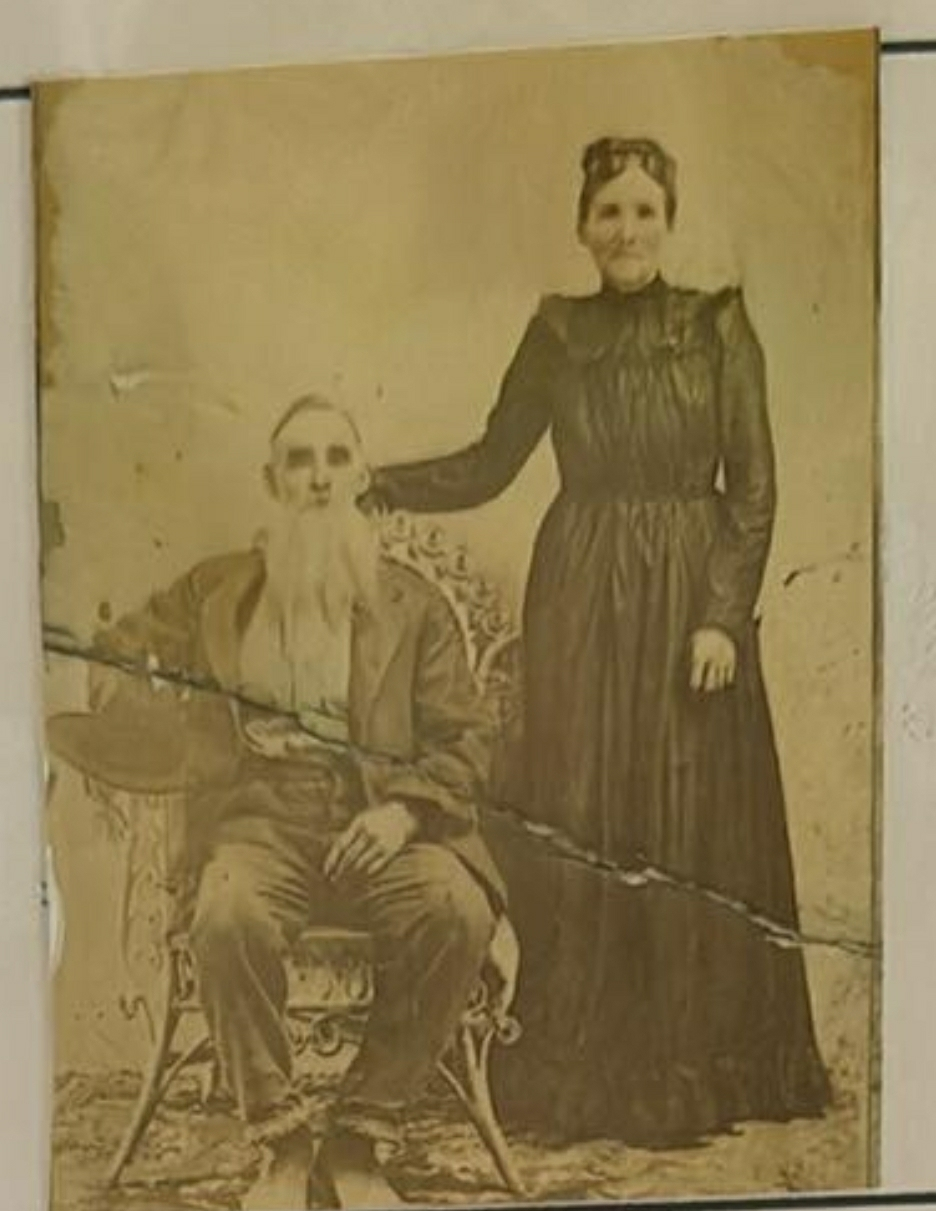
Marion Hughes, veteran of Co. A, 66th Indiana Infantry, alongside wife (c. 1900).

The 66th Indiana Infantry was organized at New Albany, Indiana and mustered in for three years' service August 19, 1862.

The regiment was attached to Cruft's Brigade, Army of Kentucky. 1st Brigade, District of Corinth, Mississippi, XIII Corps, Department of the Tennessee, December 1862. 1st Brigade, District of Corinth, XVII Corps, to January 1863. 1st Brigade, District of Corinth, XVI Corps, to March 1863. 1st Brigade, 2nd Division, XVI Corps, to September 1864. 1st Brigade, 4th Division, XV Corps, to June 1865.

The 66th Indiana Infantry mustered out of service June 3, 1865, at Washington, D.C.

== Detailed service ==
1862

August 30, Battle of Richmond. Regiment mostly captured, paroled, and sent to New Albany, Indiana; those not captured marched to New Albany, arriving September 10.

November 18. Regiment moved to Indianapolis, Indiana

December 10. Regiment moved to Corinth, Mississippi

1863

December 1862-August 1863. Garrison duty at Corinth, Mississippi

April 15 – May 2. Dodge's Expedition into Northern Alabama

April 23. Rock Cut, near Tuscumbia

April 28. Town Creek

August 18. Moved to Collierville, Tennessee

August - October 29. Duty at Collierville

October 11. Action at Collierville(Companies B, C, D, E, G, and I)

October 29 - November 11. March to Pulaski

November 11- April 29, 1864 - Duty at Pulaski

1864

May 1 – September 8. Atlanta Campaign.

May 8–13. Demonstrations on Resaca

May 9. Sugar Valley, near Resaca

May 14–15. Battle of Resaca

May 15. Ley's Ferry, Oostenaula River

May 16. Rome Cross Roads

May 18 – 25. Advance on Dallas

May 25- June 5. Operations on line of Pumpkin Vine Creek and battles about Dallas, New Hope Church, and Allatoona Hills

June 10 - July 2. Operations about Marietta and against Kennesaw Mountain

June 27. Assault on Kennesaw

July 2–5. Nickajack Creek

July 3–4. Ruff's Mills

July 5–17. Chattahoochie River

July 22. Battle of Atlanta

July 22 - August 25. Siege of Atlanta

August 25 – 30. Flank movement on Jonesboro

August 31 – September 1. Battle of Jonesboro

September 2–6. Lovejoy's Station

September 29 – November 3. Operations against Hood in northern Georgia and northern Alabama

October 12 – 13. Reconnaissance from Rome on Cave Springs Road and skirmishes

November 15 – December 10.. March to the sea

December 4. Little Ogeechee River

December 7. Jenk's Bridge and Eden Station

December 10 – 21. Siege of Savannah

1865

January to April, 1865. Campaign of the Carolinas

February 2 – 5. Salkehatchie Swamps, S.C.

February 9. South Edisto River

February 12–13. North Edisto River

February 15. South River

February 16–17. Columbia

February 16. Little Congaree Creek

March 19 – 21. Battle of Bentonville, North Carolina.

March 14. Occupation of Goldsboro

April 10 – 14. Advance on Raleigh

April 14. Occupation of Raleigh

April 26. Bennett's House

April 29 – May 19. Surrender of Johnston and his army. March to Washington, D.C., via Richmond, Va.

May 24. Grand Review of the Armies

== Casualties ==
The regiment lost a total of 250 men during service; 3 officers and 62 enlisted men killed or mortally wounded, 1 officer and 184 enlisted men died of disease.

== Commanders ==
- Colonel De Witt Clinton Anthony - resigned March 24, 1864
- Lieutenant Colonel Roger Martin - commanded during the Carolinas Campaign
- Major Thomas G. Morrison - commanded during the Battle of Richmond
- Captain John F. Baird - commanded during the Battle of Richmond

== See also ==
- List of Indiana Civil War regiments
- Indiana in the Civil War
