= Spencer S. Marsh =

American politician

Spencer S. Marsh (1798/1799 – November 30, 1875) was a judge and North Carolina State Senator. Together with Andrew Perry Allgood, he founded the first cotton mill in Northwest Georgia, the site of which is now declared as such by a historical marker.

Marsh moved to LaFayette, Georgia, in the early 1830s from North Carolina, with his wife Ruth and their children. Andrew Perry Allgood married Mary Marsh, Spencer Marsh's daughter.

The mill was built and named by its three founders for their partnership. Spencer S. Marsh and two other Walker County businessmen Andrew Perry Allgood and Col. W.K. Briers, officially organized the Trion factory on October 12, 1845. It has had few shutdowns since the first production.

Allgood purchased Briers' fourth in 1850 to grow new crops. Marsh died at his home in LaFayette on November 30, 1875, at the age of 76.
