= Chattooga Academy =

Historic school in the US state of Georgia

- U.S. National Register of Historic Places
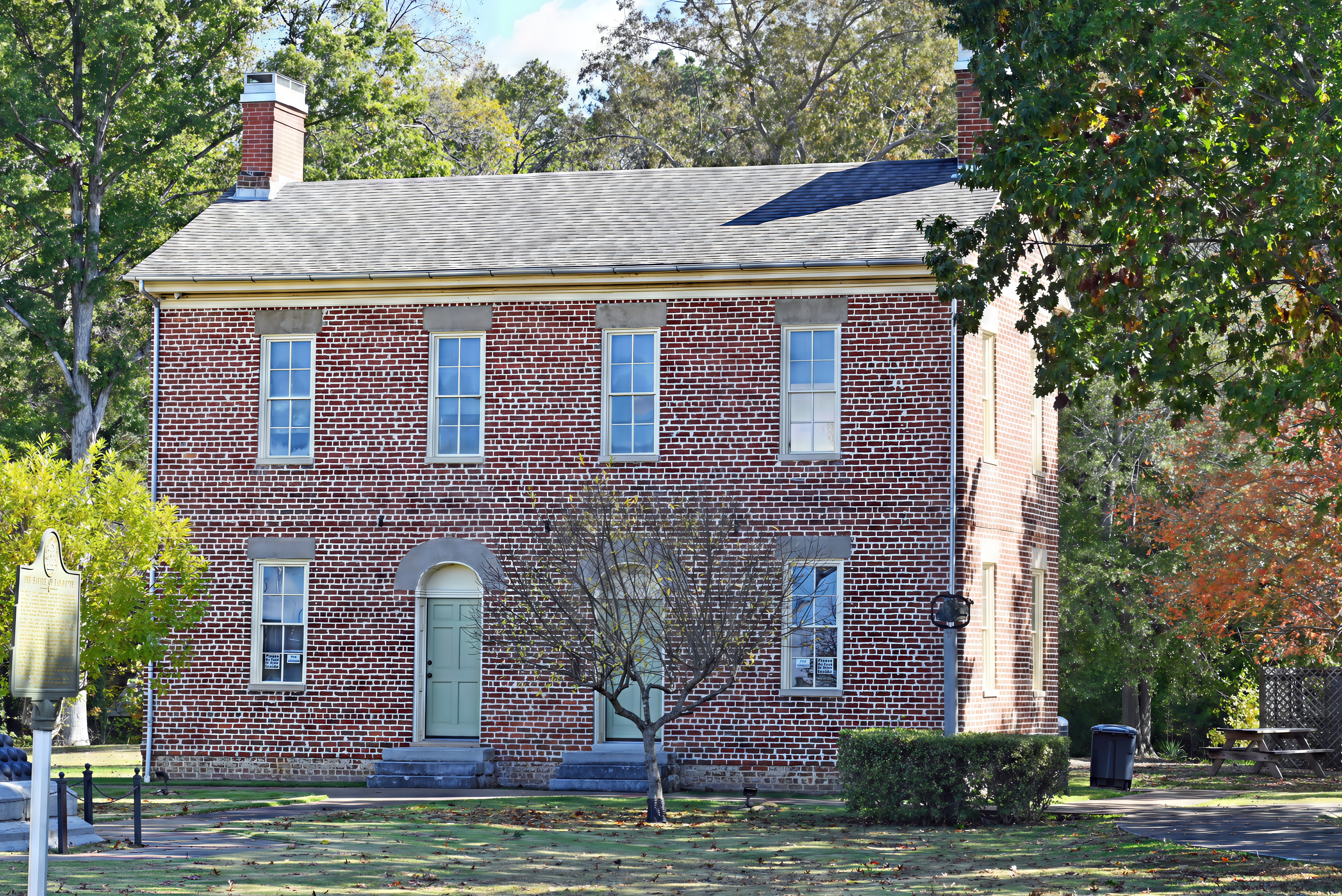
- Chattooga Academy

- Location within Georgia Location within the United States
- Location: 306 N. Main St., LaFayette, Georgia
- Coordinates: 34°42′31″N 85°16′51″W
- Area: less than one acre
- Built: 1836
- Architectural style: Federal
- NRHP reference No.: 80001253
- Added to NRHP: February 15, 1980

The Chattooga Academy, also known as John B. Gordon Hall, is listed on the National Register of Historic Places.

It is a two-story red brick Federal-style building. It was the site of the Battle of LaFayette during the American Civil War.

It had 15 boys and 37 girls as students in 1838; students boarded in the homes of families nearby. Confederate general John B. Gordon (1832-1904) was an early student.

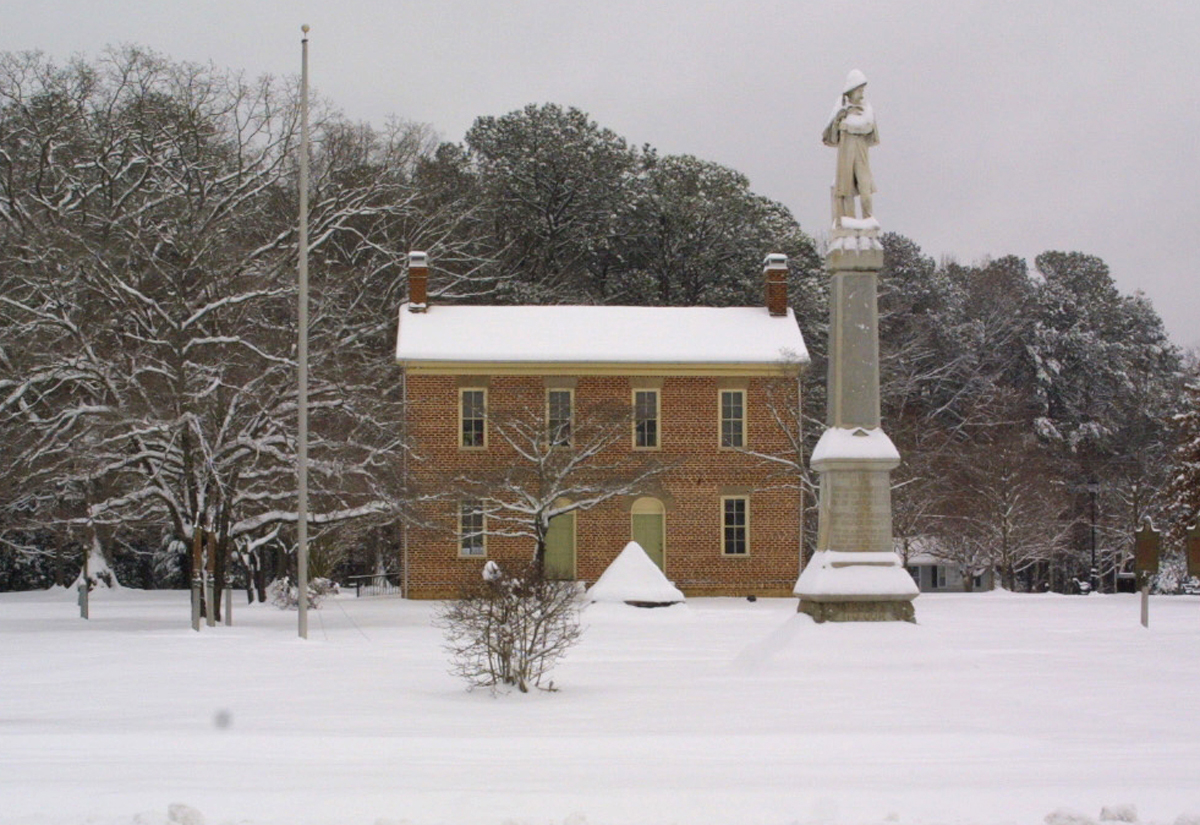
Chattooga Academy and Confederate monument

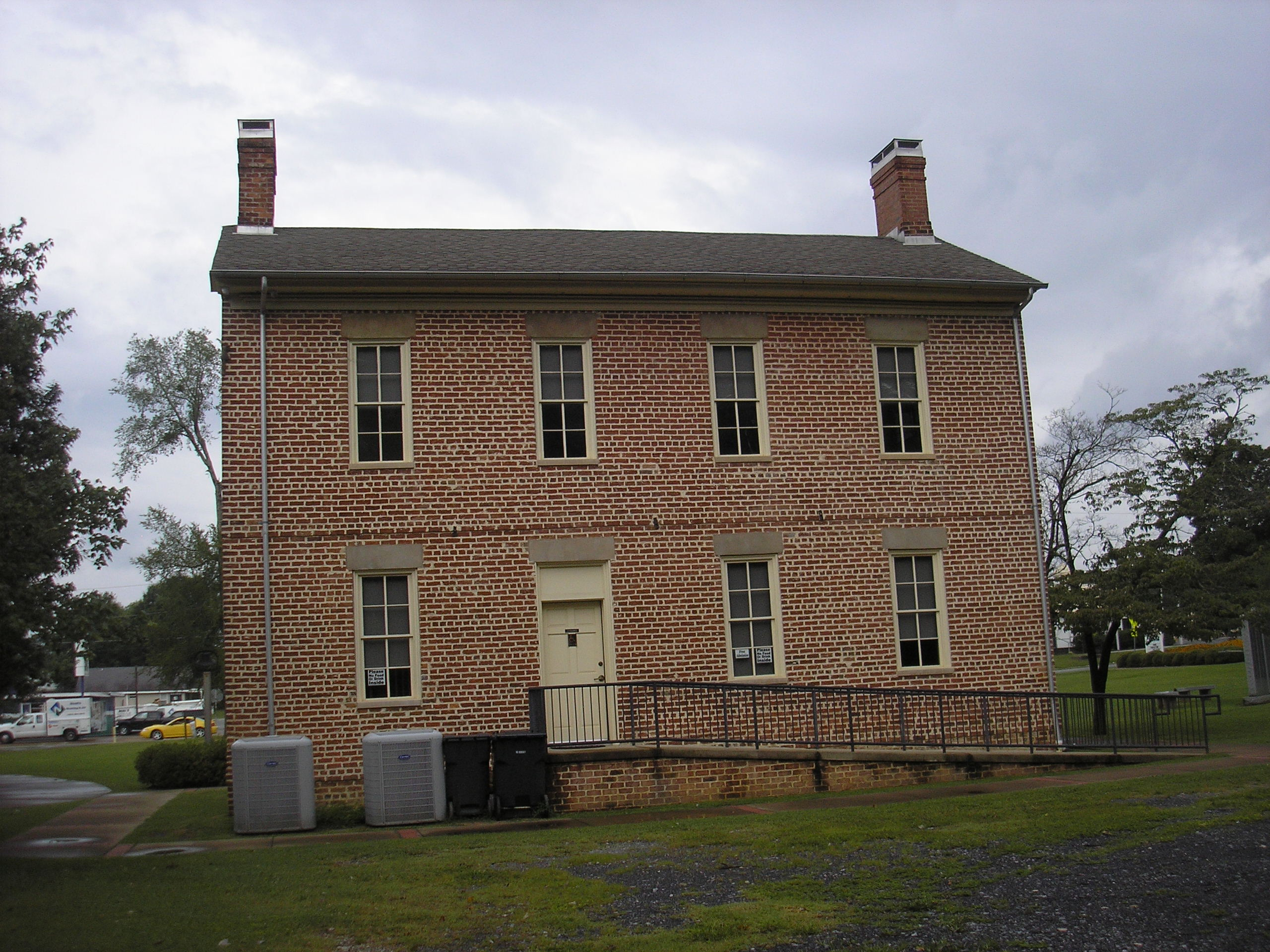

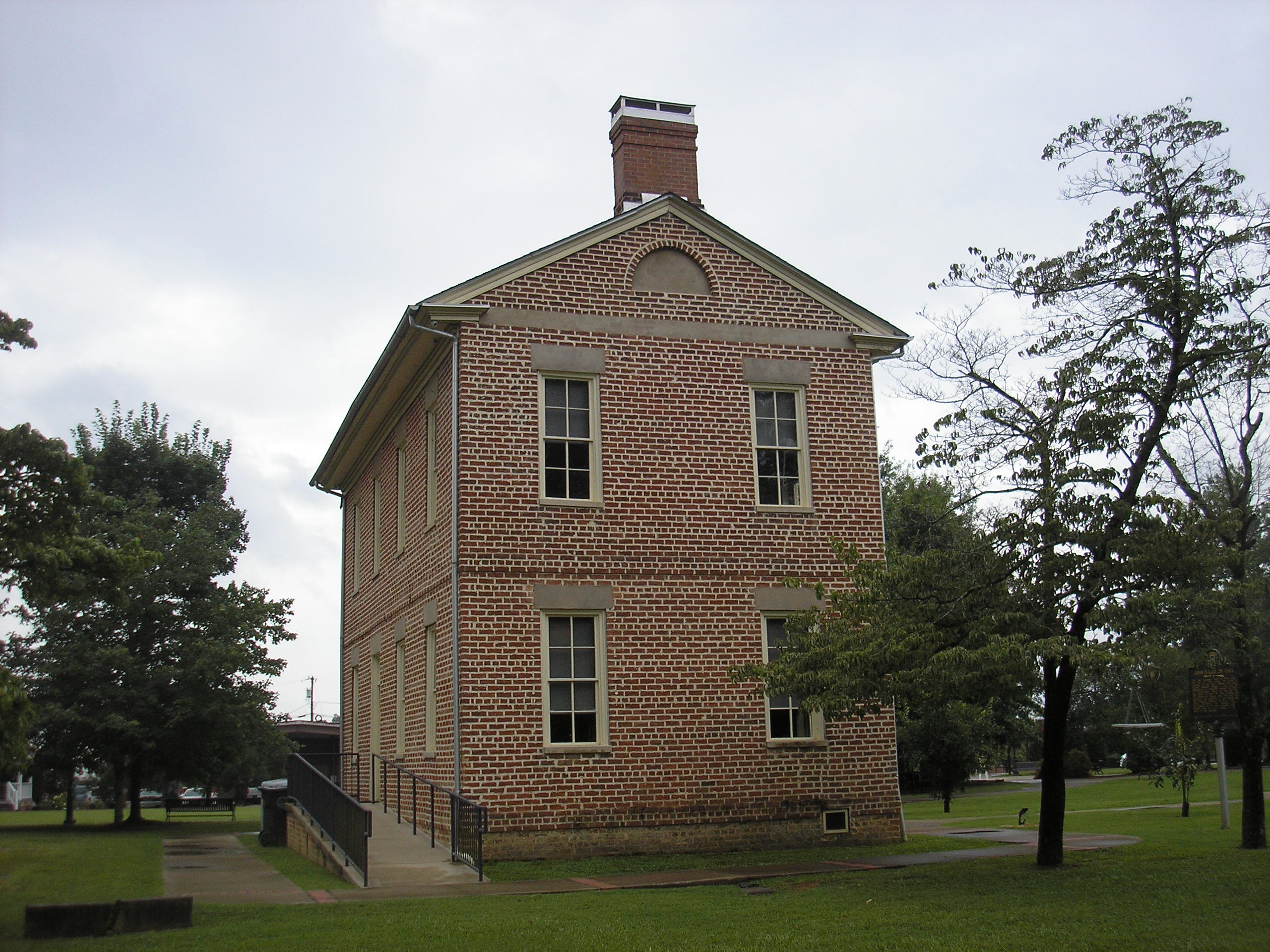
