= First Battle of Collierville =

1863 battle of the American Civil War

Coordinates: 35.044°N 89.6645°W

- Part of the American Civil War
Date	October 11, 1863 (162 years ago)
Location	Shelby County, Tennessee
Result	Union victory

Belligerents
United States (Union)	Confederate States

Commanders and leaders
(United States) William T. Sherman: De Witt Anthony	(Confederate States of America) James R. Chalmers

Strength
480 infantry	3,000 cavalry 8 guns

Casualties and losses
18 dead and 80 wounded or missing	3 dead and 48 wounded
- Location of Collierville in Tennessee

The First Battle of Collierville (October 11, 1863), also known as the Battle at the Collierville Depot, was fought during the American Civil War between the United States (Union) and Confederate States. The fighting occurred during a raid in West Tennessee and North Mississippi by Brigadier-General James R. Chalmers, Confederate States Army, commanding the expedition.

== Prelude ==
On October 11, 1863, the cavalry forces of Confederate Brigadier-General James R. Chalmers, advanced from its base in Oxford, Mississippi, to attack the Union garrison at Collierville, Tennessee. His forces consisted of the 7th, 12th, 13th and 14th Tennessee Cavalry, the 1st and 12th Mississippi Partisan Rangers, McGuirk's Mississippi Cavalry, the 18th Mississippi Battalion, and the 2d Missouri Cavalry, along with Buckner's Battery. Buckner's Battery was armed with a 6-pound, a 10-pound and four breech-loading, rapid-fire Williams Guns. Federal forces were commanded by Colonel De Witt Anthony of the 66th Indiana Infantry, which had established defenses at the railroad depot and a stockade having 8-foot (2.4 m)-high walls and also along a line of rifle-pits.

Chalmers' plan was to approach from the south and cut the telegraph lines, burn the railroad trestles, and surround the fort. The 7th Tennessee and 13th Tennessee and 2d Missouri Cavalry were to attack from the west, while Richardson's brigade consisting of the 12th, 13th, and 14th Tennessee and the 12th Mississippi Cavalry attacked from the east. The artillery supported by the 18th Mississippi Battalion was placed on a ridge in the center within 600 yards of the fort and railroad depot. McGuirk's regiment and the 1st Mississippi Partisan Rangers were sent around the right flank for an attack from the north and gain possession of the town.

== Battle ==
About 12 noon, a train containing Major-General William T. Sherman arrived from Memphis with the 13th U.S. Infantry, which brought the total number of men fighting in the battle to about 1,280. The 13th U.S. was ordered to the left of the 66th Indiana into the woods. Moving north, Colonel McGuirk's command came upon a 40-acre (160,000 m^{2}) Union cavalry camp on the north side of the town. After routing the 7th Illinois Cavalry into the river bottoms and capturing 150 prisoners and 5 stands of colors, McGuirk's men loaded 18 wagons of supplies and destroyed an additional 30 wagons. Because of this delay, Colonel McGuirk was unable to attack the fort from the north as planned. The battle raged around the fort and depot, and eventually the Confederates drove all the Union forces into the fort, the depot or railroad cuts for protection. Neither side was able to gain control of the battle. Fearing reinforcements from Germantown, Tennessee, the Confederates withdrew without taking the fort.

== Aftermath ==
Union losses were 18 dead and 80 wounded or missing. Confederate losses were 51 killed or wounded. Sherman narrowly escaped capture as Confederates boarded his train and captured personal items, including his horse, Dolly.
