= 12th Mississippi Cavalry Battalion =

19th century confederate calvary battalion from Mississippi

Inge's Battalion 12th Mississippi Cavalry Battalion 12th Mississippi Partisan Rangers
- Active: 1863–1865
- Country: Confederate States
- Allegiance: Mississippi
- Branch: Confederate States Army
- Type: Cavalry
- Size: Battalion; Regiment
- Battles: American Civil War: Grierson's Raid; First Battle of Collierville; Meridian Campaign; Atlanta Campaign; Sherman's March to the Sea; Battle of Selma

Commanders
- Notable commanders: William M. Inge

The 12th Mississippi Cavalry Battalion, also known as Inge's Battalion, and the 12th Mississippi Partisan Rangers was a cavalry unit of the Confederate States Army during the American Civil War. The 12th Battalion fought in various actions in the western theater during the later stages of the war before surrendering in Georgia in 1865.

== History ==
Inge's Battalion was established in 1863 by Colonel William M. Inge, who volunteered for the army at the outbreak of the war and had previously served in Virginia as part of the 12th Mississippi Infantry Regiment The battalion initially took part in defensive operations in northeast Mississippi, then joined cavalry raids into Tennessee to disrupt Union supply lines. Inge's battalion clashed with Union cavalry near Palo Alto in April during Grierson's Raid, fought a skirmish near Tupelo in May, and took part in the First Battle of Collierville under General James R. Chalmers in October. In the fall of 1863 the battalion was designated as the 12th Mississippi Partisan Rangers.

The Confederate Congress had passed the Partisan Ranger Act in April, 1862 to authorize the formation of irregular units, with the intention of sparking resistance to Federal authority in Union-controlled regions of the South. Partisan Ranger units were subject to the same regulations as regular Confederate Army troops, but in addition to their regular pay, they also received a bounty from the government for any captured Federal arms they turned over to army quartermasters. In contrast to resistance fighters in later conflicts, Confederate Partisan Rangers wore military uniforms, were subject to the regular chain of command, and were enrolled as soldiers in the army. However, professional soldiers such as Robert E. Lee believed that Partisan Ranger units wasted manpower that could be directed to the more effective regular army.

The Confederacy repealed the Partisan Ranger Act in February 1864, and many partisan ranger units were reorganized as regular cavalry units. In early 1864 the 12th Partisans were re-designated as 12th Battalion, Mississippi Cavalry. After fighting against Union General William T. Sherman's troops in the Meridian Campaign, the 12th Battalion was moved to Alabama and then joined the Atlanta Campaign as part of General Samuel W. Ferguson's brigade. The 12th Battalion took heavy casualties at the Battle of Resaca, then continued to oppose Sherman's forces during his march to the sea.

In January 1865, a company made up of Mississippi troops was detached from the 56th Alabama Cavalry Regiment and combined with the 12th Battalion to form the 10th Mississippi Cavalry Regiment. This consolidated regiment surrendered at Macon, Georgia in April 1865 shortly after the Battle of Selma.

In some sources Inge's Battalion is referred to as the 12th Mississippi Cavalry Regiment, rather than its correct designation as a battalion. Another unrelated regiment more commonly known as the 16th Confederate Cavalry Regiment also briefly used the name 12th Mississippi in the final stages of the war.

== Commanders ==
Commanders of the 12th Mississippi Cavalry Battalion:

- Colonel William M. Inge
- Lieutenant Colonel William M. Pound

== See also ==
- List of Mississippi Civil War Confederate units
