= Andrew Perry Allgood =

American businessman

Andrew Perry Allgood (November 23, 1816 – September 8, 1882) was an American businessman.

Born in Laurens County, South Carolina, in 1836, the Allgood family moved to northwestern Georgia. In 1936, Allgood moved to La Fayette, Georgia and opened a general merchandise store. In 1845, Allgood, along with Spencer Marsh and W. K. Briers founded a mill in what is now Trion, Georgia. It went into operation in 1847 with 600 spindles and 40 employees.

In 1858, Allgood's mill was used as a hospital for the community during an outbreak of typhoid fever. During the American Civil War, Allgood employees provided clothing for the confederate soldiers. Even though the mill was manufacturing cloth for the Confederate Army, Allgood convinced General Sherman to protect the mill by pledging loyalty to the union. Sherman ordered that Trion Mill be closed but left a guard to protect it. The plant was closed from May 1864 to May 1865, but went back into production soon after the close of the War.

On April 10, 1875, a fire destroyed the mill; in less than six months, a new building had been constructed, and the mill was back in operation. The burning of his mill in 1875 was ruled to be the work of arsonists loyal to the Confederacy. Allgood became a judge of the Inferior Court of Chattooga County and served for most of his remaining years after moving with his wife to the Trion area.

== Personal life ==
He married Mary Ann Marsh. They had six children. The burning of the mill and the death of his fifteen-year-old daughter in 1878 were tragedies from which he never fully recovered. His health began to decline, and he died on September 8, 1882, aged 65. Allgood is buried in La Fayette cemetery.
