= 12th Mississippi Infantry Regiment =

- Active: 1861-1865
- Disbanded: April 9, 1865
- Country: Confederate States of America
- Allegiance: Mississippi
- Branch: Confederate States Army
- Type: Infantry
- Size: Regiment
- Battles: American Civil War: Battle of Seven Pines; Seven Days Battles; Battle of Antietam; Battle of Fredericksburg; Battle of Chancellorsville; Battle of Spotsylvania Courthouse; Siege of Petersburg

Commanders
- Notable commanders: Richard Griffith

The 12th Mississippi Infantry Regiment was a Confederate infantry regiment from Mississippi. As part of the Army of Northern Virginia, the 12th Mississippi fought in many battles of the Eastern theater of the American Civil War before surrendering in April 1865.

== History ==
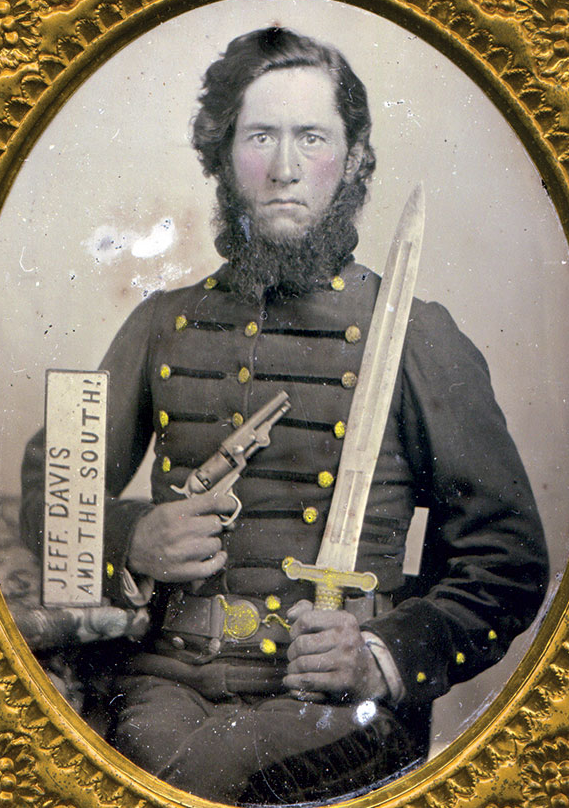
Joseph C. White, of the 12th Mississippi Infantry, photographed at Corinth, Mississippi, c.1861

The companies of the 12th Regiment were organized in the spring of 1861, initially for state service. The Regiment was sent to Virginia in July, with an original strength of 1,013 men. The 12th arrived too late to participate in the First Battle of Bull Run, and spent the remainder of the year in camp. The 12th's colonel, Richard Griffith was promoted to brigadier general in November and given command of a brigade of Mississippi regiments. Griffith had previously served in the Mexican-American War alongside Confederate President Jefferson Davis. The 12th did not see combat until 1862, when it fought in the Battle of Seven Pines, losing 41 killed and 152 wounded. As part of General Winfield S. Featherston's brigade, the 12th fought in the Seven Days Battles, where Richard Griffith was mortally wounded on June 29.

The Regiment took part in the Second Manassas Campaign, the Battle of Antietam, and the Battle of Fredericksburg. The 12th took so many casualties in these battles that Col. William H. Taylor wrote to the governor of Mississippi the day after Antietam asking for conscripts to replenish the ranks: "My Regiment has Suffered Severely in Evry [sic] Engagement it has been in and at this time does not number One Hundred effective men for Battle So reduced is it by Deaths Discharges and wounds...I am very much afraid if I can not get the Conscripts my Regiment will be disbanded."

As part of General Carnot Posey's brigade, the 12th fought at Chancellorsville, where Col. Merry B. Harris was severely wounded. During the Battle of Gettysburg, the 12th Regiment was held in reserve and did not see much fighting. After the retreat from Pennsylvania, the regiment fought at Bristoe Station, where brigade commander Carnot Posey was killed, and Mine Run before spending the winter in Virginia.

In 1864, during the Battle of Spotsylvania Courthouse, the 12th Mississippi took part in some of the bloodiest and most intense combat of the war, at the location known as the "Bloody Angle". This location was the site of some of the fiercest combat of the civil war, as Union and Confederate troops made desperate attacks and counter-attacks over nearly 24 hours of continuous battle. General Nathaniel H. Harris, commanding a Mississippi brigade that included the 12th Regiment, described the intensity of the battle his troops were engaged in: "Thus from 7 a.m. of the 12th to 3.30 a.m. on May 13 (twenty hours) my men were exposed to a constant and destructive fire, both from front and flank, and during the hours of day to a heavy artillery fire, in which mortars were used by the enemy for the first time during the campaign. A cold, drenching rain fell during the greater portion of the day and night and the trenches were filled with water. Great difficulty was experienced in procuring supplies of ammunition, man after man being shot down while bringing it in... As an instance of the terrible nature of the fire, trees 22 inches in diameter were hewn to splinters and felled by the musketry."

The regiment was sent to defend Petersburg, Virginia, and was engaged in several battles on the defensive lines. Col. Merry B. Harris was hit by sniper fire in the Petersburg trenches and was permanently disabled. In the Battle of Globe Tavern, more than 100 men from the 12th and 16th Mississippi were captured, including Colonel S.B. Thomas of the 12th. During the final stages of the Siege of Petersburg, the 12th was assigned to hold Fort Gregg, and took part in brutal hand-to-hand fighting during the Federal breakthrough on April 2. The survivors were captured, although at least some men of the 12th escaped the fall of Petersburg and were present at the final surrender of the Army of Northern Virginia at Appomattox Court House on April 9, 1865.

== Notable members ==
- William M. Inge, later a cavalry colonel and Speaker of the Mississippi House of Representatives.
- Henry Thomas Harrison, Confederate spy.

== Commanders ==
Commanders of the 9th Mississippi Infantry:

- Col. Richard Griffith, promoted to brigadier general.
- Col. William H. Taylor
- Col. Merry B. Harris, wounded at Petersburg.
- Col. S.B. Thomas, captured at Globe Tavern.
- Lt. Col. James H. Duncan, of the 19th Mississippi (temporary command).

== Organization ==
Companies of the 12th Mississippi Infantry:

- Company A, "Charlie Clark Rifles" of Jefferson County.
- Company B, "Natchez Fencibles"
- Company C, "Raymond Fencibles" of Hinds County.
- Company D, "Pettus Rifles" of Copiah County.
- Company E, "Sardis Blues" of Panola County.
- Company F, "Durant Rifles" of Holmes County
- Company G, "Vicksburg Sharpshooters"
- Company H, "Claiborne Guards"
- Company I, "Satartia Rifles" of Yazoo County
- Company K, "Lawrence Rifles"

== See also ==
- List of Mississippi Civil War Confederate units
