= Battle of LaFayette =

Military engagement of the American Civil War

Coordinates: 34°42′31″N 85°16′51″W

- Part of the American Civil War
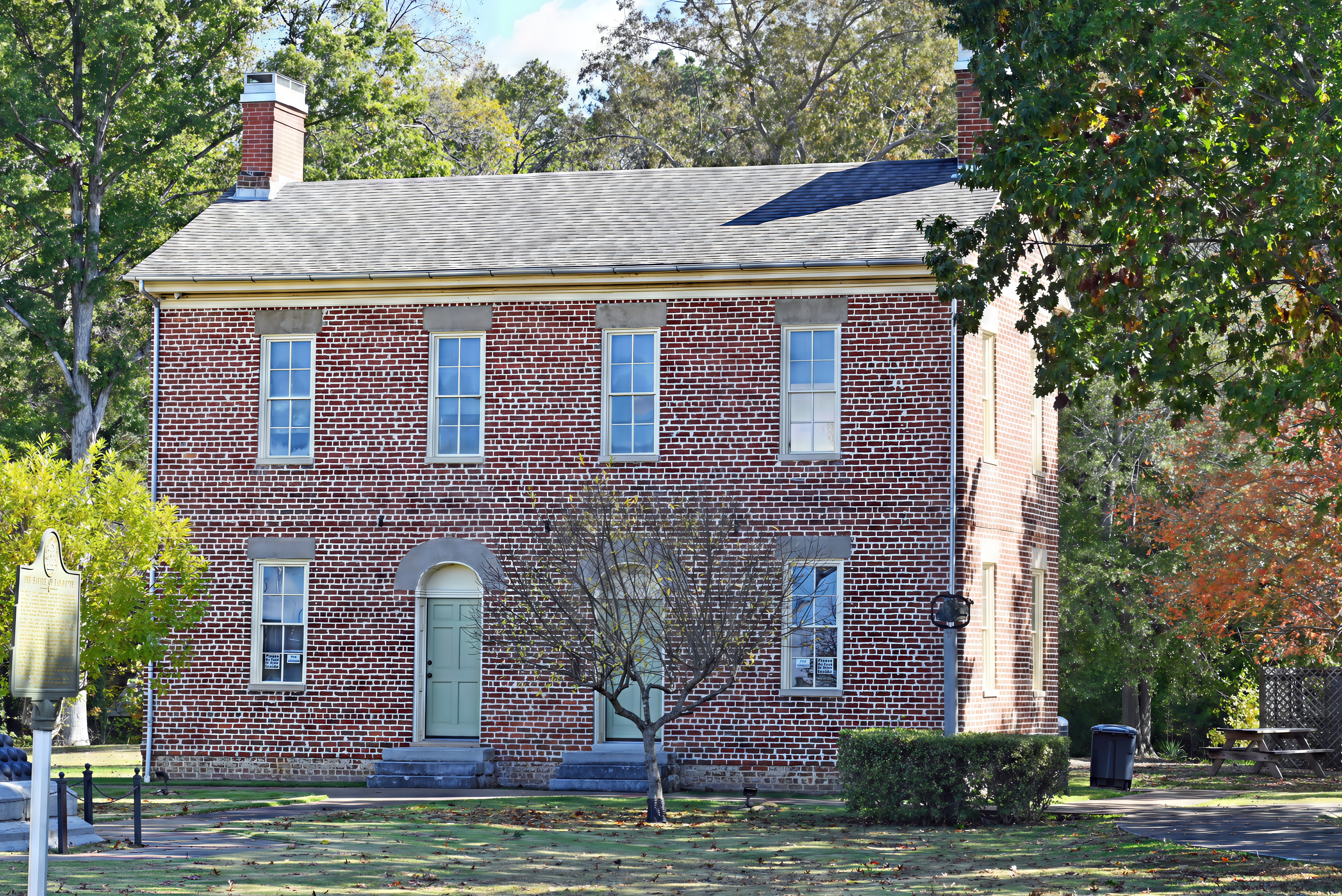
- Chattooga Academy, which played a major role in the battle
Date	June 24th, 1864
Location	LaFayette, Georgia
Result	Union victory

Belligerents
United States of America	Confederate States of America

Commanders and leaders
Louis D. Watkins; John Croxton	Gideon J. Pillow; Charles Armistead; James Neely

Units involved
7th Kentucky Cavalry Regiment; 4th Kentucky Mounted Infantry Regiment	2 cavalry brigades

Strength
~450 cavalrymen	~1,600 cavalrymen

Casualties and losses
4 killed 7 wounded 53 captured Total: 64	24 killed 53 wounded 78 captured Total: 155

The Battle of LaFayette (alternatively capitalized as the Battle of Lafayette), was a battle of the American Civil War, taking place on June 24, 1864, during the Atlanta campaign. LaFayette, Georgia, was under military occupation by Union Army Colonel Louis D. Watkins. Confederate Brigadier General Gideon J. Pillow attacked Union forces in LaFatette. At first, Confederate forces maintained short-lived victories, but a three-hour stalemate ensued, and eventually, Union Col. John Croxton arrived in time to push Pillow to retreat.

== Background ==
Col. Watkins first arrived, with around 450 cavalrymen of the Kentucky brigade, at LaFayette on June 18, 1864, during the Atlanta campaign, “to endeavor to rid the country of several guerilla bands”, including that of John Gatewood, an infamous criminal. He positioned himself first in the city's courthouse, built out of stucco and brick and standing two stories high, then in the city square, and his soldiers in nearby structures.

In early June 1864, following a series of unsuccessful battles led by Pillow, he was assigned a cavalry division of about 1,600 men, after he implored for a command for months. On the day of the battle, Gen. Pillow was navigating through the north of Georgia, aiming to burn railroad bridges over Chickamauga Creek to sabotage William T. Sherman’s, and ultimately, the Union’s, communications. During this time, he heard of LaFayette’s occupation, postponed his plans, and decided to engage in military conflict with Watkins, starting the battle at Lafayette.

== Battle ==
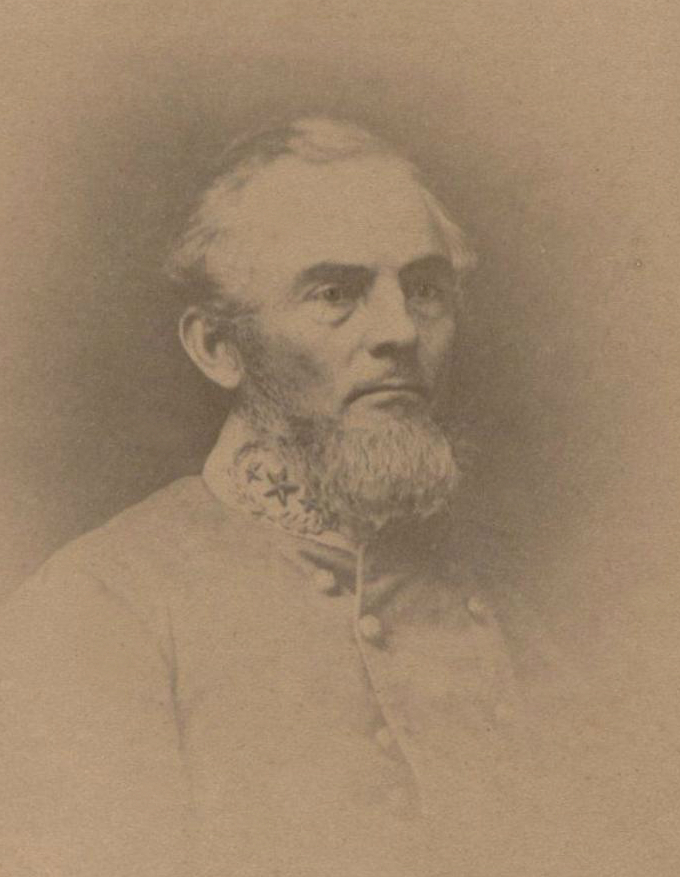
Pillow in about 1862

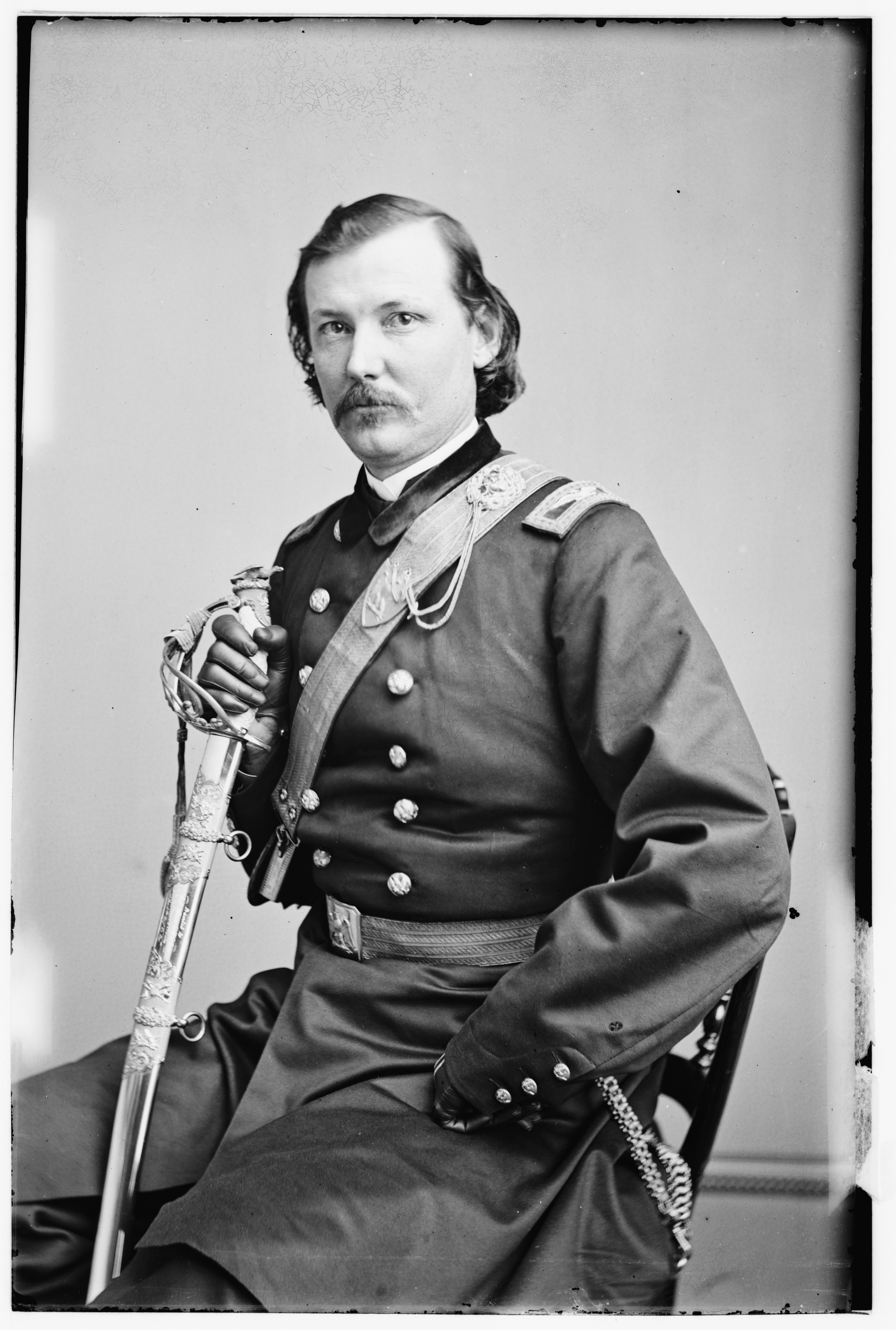
Watkins sometime in the period of 1865-68

At around 3:30 a.m, June 24, Col. Charles Armistead's 16th Confederate Cavalry Regiment, after being split from Col. James Neely’s brigade which Pillow accompanied, arrived at the western perimeter of LaFayette. Alabamians, Mississippians, and Tennesseans comprised the Confederate forces. Pillow, Neely, and their soldiers arrived a half-hour later, the same time at which Armistead's skirmishers would fire the first shots. Many soldiers of the 7th Kentucky were captured by Confederate forces approaching from the east and north after being awaked by alarms at about this time. The remaining soldiers barricaded themselves in the courthouse with sacks of corn, and there was a lack of ammunition and water while they were there.

At around 5 a.m, Pillow stated that Watkins should surrender or risk the town being set on fire. Watkins declined the demand. Following this reply, Pillow attacked the courthouse. The siege lasted over three hours before, in an unprecedented move at about 8:30, Colonel John Croxton, commander of the 4th Kentucky Mounted Infantry, took the Confederates by surprise by attacking them from behind. A Union soldier, having escaped the siege, had traveled 8 mi (13 km) north on horseback, finding Croxton at Rock Springs Church. Pillow and his men soon retreated, marking a Union victory. Throughout the battle, Chattooga Academy, also known as John B. Gordon Hall, was in the line of fire and was the location of an intense skirmish. The Lafayette Presbyterian Church served as a field hospital during the battle.

== Aftermath and legacy ==
Ultimately, Pillow's defeat at LaFayette would crush Joseph E. Johnston’s plans of interrupting General Sherman's communications. In 1957, a marker was erected in LaFayette that provided information about the battle by the Georgia Historical Commission. Many Confederate soldiers that died in the Battle of LaFayette are buried in the LaFayette City Cemetery, and although names were not provided, the Sons of Confederate Veterans performed research and were able to find the names of eighteen out of twenty-four of them.
