= 56th Alabama Cavalry Regiment =

Cavalry regiment of the Confederate States Army

- Active: 1863–1865
- Disbanded: May 5, 1865
- Country: Confederate States
- Allegiance: Alabama
- Branch: Army
- Type: Cavalry
- Role: Partisan Rangers
- Size: Regiment
- Part of: Ferguson's Brigade
- Facings: Yellow
- Battles: American Civil War; Battle of Rocky Face Ridge; Battle of New Hope Church; Battle of Marietta; Battle of Peachtree Creek; Battle of Atlanta; Battle of Jonesborough; Battle of Lovejoy's Station; Battle of Ladiga; Siege of Savannah; Carolinas Campaign

The 56th Alabama Cavalry Regiment, also known as the 56th Alabama Partisan Rangers, was a formation of the Confederate States Army in the Western Theater of the American Civil War.

== History ==
The 56th Alabama Partisan Rangers was formed on June 8, 1863, by the consolidation of five companies of the 13th Alabama Partisan Rangers, led by Major William A. Hewlett, with the 15th Alabama Partisan Rangers led by Major William Boyles who was promoted to colonel and given command of the new regiment.

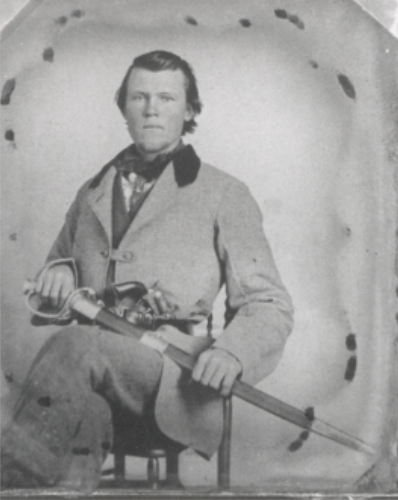
Portrait of Second Lieutenant Charles V. Phillips, Company F, 56th Alabama Partisan Rangers.

The Confederate Congress had passed the Partisan Ranger Act in April, 1862 to authorize the formation of irregular guerilla units, with the intention of sparking resistance to Federal authority in Union-controlled regions such as West Virginia. Partisan Ranger units were subject to the same regulations as regular Confederate Army troops, but in addition to their regular pay, they also received a bounty from the government for any captured Federal arms they turned over to army quartermasters. In contrast to resistance fighters in 20th century conflicts, Confederate Partisan Rangers wore military uniforms, were subject to the regular chain of command, and were enrolled as soldiers in the army. However, professional officers such as Robert E. Lee believed that Partisan Ranger units wasted manpower that could be directed to the more effective regular army. To prevent the flow of men eligible for conscription into partisan service, the army passed new regulations in the summer of 1862 prohibiting transfer from regular units to Partisan Ranger units, and required a minimum age of 35 to join partisan companies. Excessive violence by partisan leaders such as William Quantrill and "Bloody" Bill Anderson damaged the reputation of these units and led the Confederacy to repeal the Partisan Ranger Act in February 1864.

Prior to consolidation, these battalions had been assigned to guard and picket duty in Alabama and Mississippi. The 13th Battalion was formed on August 28, 1862, and the 15th was organized on August 25. Both battalions fought at the Battle of King's Creek near Tupelo, Mississippi on May 5, 1863, under the command of General Daniel Ruggles. The 56th was stationed in North Mississippi in the summer of 1863. The regiment then took part in the Meridian campaign, and the Atlanta campaign, including the Battle of Peachtree Creek and Battle of Atlanta, and harassed Union General William T. Sherman's troops during his March to the Sea. The regiment was recruited from Autauga, Montgomery, Mobile, Butler, and Walker counties, and one company was recruited from Mississippi. In January, 1865, the Mississippi company was detached from the 56th Alabama and joined the 12th Mississippi Cavalry Battalion to form the 10th Mississippi Cavalry. The 56th Alabama surrendered at Greensboro, North Carolina.

== Commanding officers ==
Commanders of the regiment:

- Col. William Boyles
- Lt. Col. William A. Hewlett
- Lt. Col. P.H. Debardeblaben
- Lt. Col. William F. Martin

== See also ==
- List of Confederate units from Alabama
