= 3d Mississippi Cavalry Regiment =

Cavalry regiment of the Confederate States Army

- Active: 1863–1865
- Disbanded: May 12, 1865
- Country: Confederate States
- Allegiance: Mississippi
- Branch: Army
- Type: Cavalry
- Size: Regiment
- Part of: Adams' Brigade
- Facings: Yellow
- Battles: American Civil War; Battle of Salem; Battle of Collierville; Battle of Wyatt; Battle of Okolona; Battle of Ezra Church; Battle of Jonesborough

Commanders
- Commanding officer: Col. John McGuirk

The 3d Mississippi Cavalry Regiment was a cavalry formation of the Confederate States Army in the Western Theater of the American Civil War commanded by Colonel John McGuirk.

== History ==
The regiment was organized on June 9, 1863, at Panola from new and existing companies of the Mississippi State Troops, as the 3d Mississippi State Cavalry Regiment and was assigned to the 5th Military District, Department of Mississippi and East Louisiana. The commanding officer was John McGuirk, a native of New York State and resident of Holly Springs, Mississippi, who had fought in Virginia as a lieutenant colonel in the 17th Mississippi Infantry Regiment. In the summer and fall of 1863 the regiment served in North Mississippi and Tennessee, opposing Federal cavalry raids, and taking part in various counter-raids against Union-controlled railroads and garrisons, including the Battle of Collierville in October 1863 and numerous other skirmishes.

The regiment was reorganized in April, 1864, and mustered into Confederate service on May 3, 1864, as the 3d Mississippi Cavalry Regiment. It reported a strength of 325 men upon transfer to Confederate service under Gholson's brigade of Forrest's Cavalry Corps, which was led by Col. McGuirk of the 3d. The 3d alternated between being part of Forrest's command and the cavalry brigade of General Wirt Adams. In 1864, it was again active in North Mississippi, opposing Sherman's Meridian campaign, fighting in various skirmishes as well as the Battle of Okolona. In late July the regiment was sent to Georgia and assigned to Jacksons's Cavalry division on the Atlanta defensive lines, fighting at the Battle of Ezra Church and Battle of Jonesborough. The remnants of the 3d Mississippi retreated to Alabama with Forrest's Cavalry, where it was disbanded on May 12, 1865, following the Confederate surrender at Gainesville.

== Regimental order of battle ==
Units of McGuirk's regiment included:

- Company A
- Company B
- Company C
- Company D
- Company E
- Company F
- Company G
- Company H (Kilgore Rangers)
- Company I (Webb’s Rangers)
- Company K (Barksdale’s Rangers)

== See also ==
- List of Confederate units from Mississippi
