= William M. Inge (Mississippi politician) =

American politician (1832-1900)

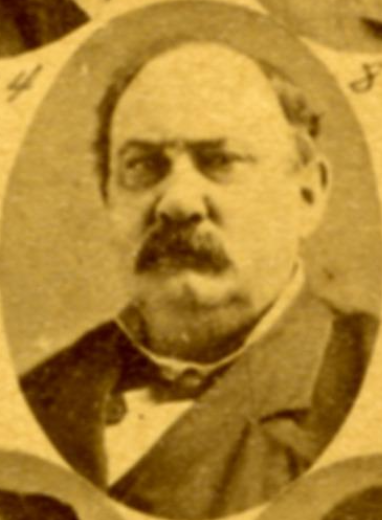

Speaker of the Mississippi House of Representatives
- In office January 1884 – January 1886
- Preceded by: W. H. H. Tison
- Succeeded by: Jacob H. Sharp

Member of the Mississippi House of Representatives from the Alcorn County district
- In office January 1882 – January 1886 Serving with 1884–1886: T. H. Underwood; 1882–1884: W. H. Reese
- Preceded by: K. M. Harrison; W. H. Reese
- Succeeded by: M. W. Bynum; J. P. Carraway

Personal details
- Born: February 22, 1832 Greene County, Alabama, U.S.
- Died: November 26, 1900 (aged 68) Corinth, Mississippi, U.S.
- Party: Democratic

Military service
- Allegiance: Confederate States
- Branch/service: Army
- Years of service: 1861–1865
- Rank: Colonel
- Commands: 10th Mississippi Cavalry Regiment
- Battles: American Civil War; Battle of Shiloh; Battle of Savage's Station; Battle of Malvern Hill; Battle of Atlanta; Battle of Ladiga; Siege of Savannah; Campaign of the Carolinas

William M. Inge (February 22, 1832 – November 26, 1900) was an American politician who served as the Speaker of the Mississippi House of Representatives from 1884 to 1886.

== Biography ==
William M. Inge was born on February 22, 1832, in Greene County, Alabama. When he was a boy, he moved with his family to Aberdeen, Mississippi.

During the American Civil War, Inge served in the Confederate States Army. Originally being adjutant of the 12th Mississippi Infantry Regiment and then a staff officer, serving in the Eastern Theater, later he became a partisan and cavalry commander in the Western Theater. In 1863 he organized and was elected colonel of the 12th Mississippi Cavalry Battalion, which he led until the end of the war.

In 1881, Inge was elected to represent Alcorn County as a Democrat in the Mississippi House of Representatives for the 1882–1884 term. He was re-elected in 1883 for the 1884–1886 term. During this term, Inge was elected to the position of the House's Speaker. Inge died at his home in Corinth, Mississippi, on November 26, 1900.
