= 6th Kentucky Cavalry Regiment =

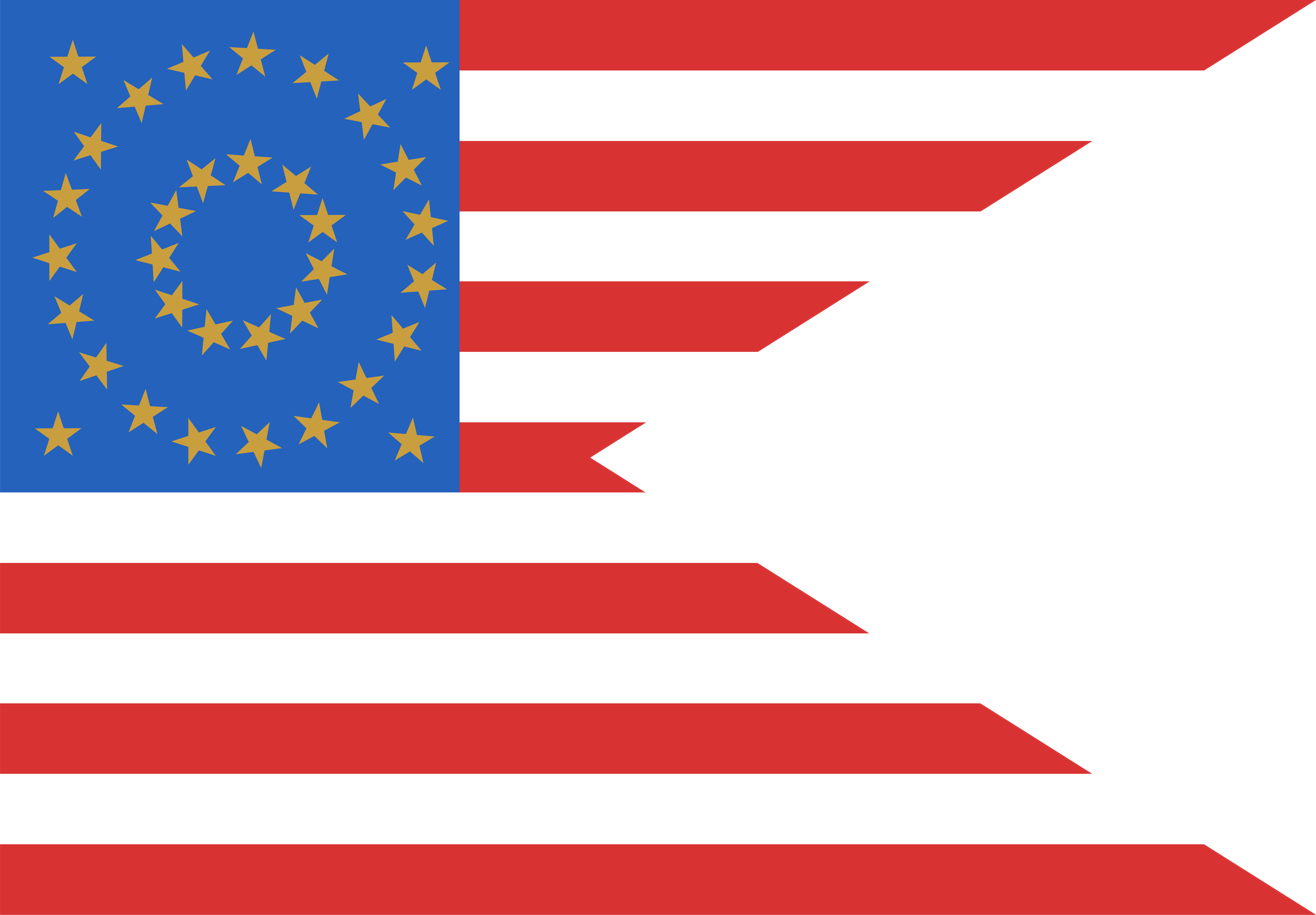
- Active: July 1862 – September 6, 1865
- Country: United States
- Allegiance: Union
- Branch: Cavalry
- Engagements: Kentucky Campaign; Battle of Richmond; Tullahoma Campaign; Battle of Chickamauga; Atlanta campaign Battle of Ladiga

The 6th Kentucky Cavalry Regiment was a cavalry regiment that served in the Union Army during the American Civil War.

== Service ==
The 6th Kentucky Cavalry Regiment was originally organized in Lexington, Kentucky, from July to October 1862 as Munday's 1st Battalion Kentucky Volunteer Cavalry (Companies A, B, C, D, & E) and served independently under the command of Major Reuben Munday. The regiment was fully reorganized at Camp Irvine near Louisville, Kentucky and mustered in for a one-year enlistment under the command of Colonel Dennis J. Halisy. Munday remained with the regiment and was promoted to lieutenant colonel.

The regiment was attached to District of Central Kentucky to October 1862. District of Louisville, Kentucky, Department of the Ohio, to November 1862. District Central Kentucky, Department of the Ohio, to January 1863. 1st Brigade, 1st Division Cavalry, Army of the Cumberland to July 1863. 3rd Brigade, 1st Division, Cavalry Corps, Army of the Cumberland, to November 1864. 3rd Brigade, 1st Division, Cavalry Corps, Military Division Mississippi, to January 1865. 1st Brigade, 1st Division, Cavalry Corps, Middle Division Mississippi, and District of Middle Tennessee, Department of the Cumberland, to September 1865.

The 6th Kentucky Cavalry mustered out of service on September 6, 1865.

== Detailed service ==
Skirmish Flat Lick August 17 (detachment). Skirmish at Slaughterville, Kentucky, September 3, 1862 (detachment). Munfordville September 20–21 (detachment). Pursuit of Bragg through Kentucky October 1–22. 1st Battalion to Litchfield and skirmish with Bragg. 2nd Battalion to Bardstown and skirmish with Wheeler. 3rd Battalion to Stanford. 1st Battalion ordered to Louisa, Kentucky, November 14, then to Mt. Sterling, Kentucky, December 9. Regiment concentrated at Lebanon, Kentucky, December 1862. Operations against John Hunt Morgan December 22, 1862 to January 2, 1863. Near Huntington December 27. Parker's Mills on Elk Fork December 28. Affair Springfield December 30 (detachment). Muldraugh's Hill near New Market December 31. Ordered to Nashville, Tennessee, January 30, then to Franklin, Tennessee, and duty there until June. Expedition from Franklin to Columbia March 8–12. Thompson's Station March 9. Rutherford Creek March 10–11. Near Thompson's Station March 23. Little Harpeth River March 25. Near Franklin March 31. Franklin April 27. Thompson's Station May 2. Moved to Triune June 2–4. Franklin June 4. Triune June 9. Tullahoma Campaign June 23-July 7. University Depot July 4. Expedition to Huntsville July 13–22. Expedition to Athens, Alabama, August 2–8. Passage of Cumberland Mountains and Tennessee River and Chickamauga Campaign August 16-September 22. Alpine, Georgia, September 5. Summerville September 6–7 and 10. Battle of Chickamauga September 19–21. Buell's Ford September 28. Operations against Wheeler and Roddy September 30-October 17. At Caperton's Ferry until January 1864. Lafayette, Georgia, December 12, 1863. Ringgold December 13. Scout to Lafayette December 21–23. Regiment veteranized January 1864, and veterans on furlough until March. Near Chattanooga, until May. Atlanta campaign May to September. Guarding railroad in rear of the army at Wauhatchie, Lafayette, Calhoun, Dalton, and Resaca. At Wauhatchie, Tennessee, May 5 to June 18. At Lafayette, June 18 to August 4. Summerville July 7. Actions at Lafayette June 24 and 30. Scouting about Calhoun, Adairsville, and Resaca until October 12. Pine Log Creek near Fairmount August 14. Rousseau's pursuit of Joseph Wheeler September 1–8. Resaca October 12–13. Near Summerville October 18. Little River, Alabama, October 20. Leesburg October 21. Ladiga, Terrapin Creek, October 28. Moved to Louisville, Kentucky, November 3–9. McCook's pursuit of Lyon December 6–28. Hopkinsville, Kentucky, December 16. At Nashville, Tennessee, until January 9. Moved to Gravelly Springs, Alabama, and duty there until March. Wilson's Raid from Chickasaw, Alabama, to Macon, Georgia, March 22-April 24. Centerville April 1. Trion April 1. Selma April 2. Northport near Tuscaloosa April 4. Lapier's Mills, Sipsey Creek, April 6. King's Store April 6 (Company D). Occupation of Talladega April 22. Munford's Station April 23. At Macon until June. Moved to Nashville, and duty in District of Middle Tennessee until September. Non-veterans mustered out at Edgefield July 14, 1865.

== Casualties ==
The regiment lost a total of 288 men during service; 2 officers and 31 enlisted men killed or mortally wounded, 4 officers and 251 enlisted men died of disease.

== Commanders ==
- Colonel Dennis J. Halisy
- Lieutenant Colonel Reuben Munday
- Major Louis A. Gratz

== See also ==
- List of Kentucky Civil War Units
- Kentucky in the Civil War
