= LaFayette, Georgia =

- City
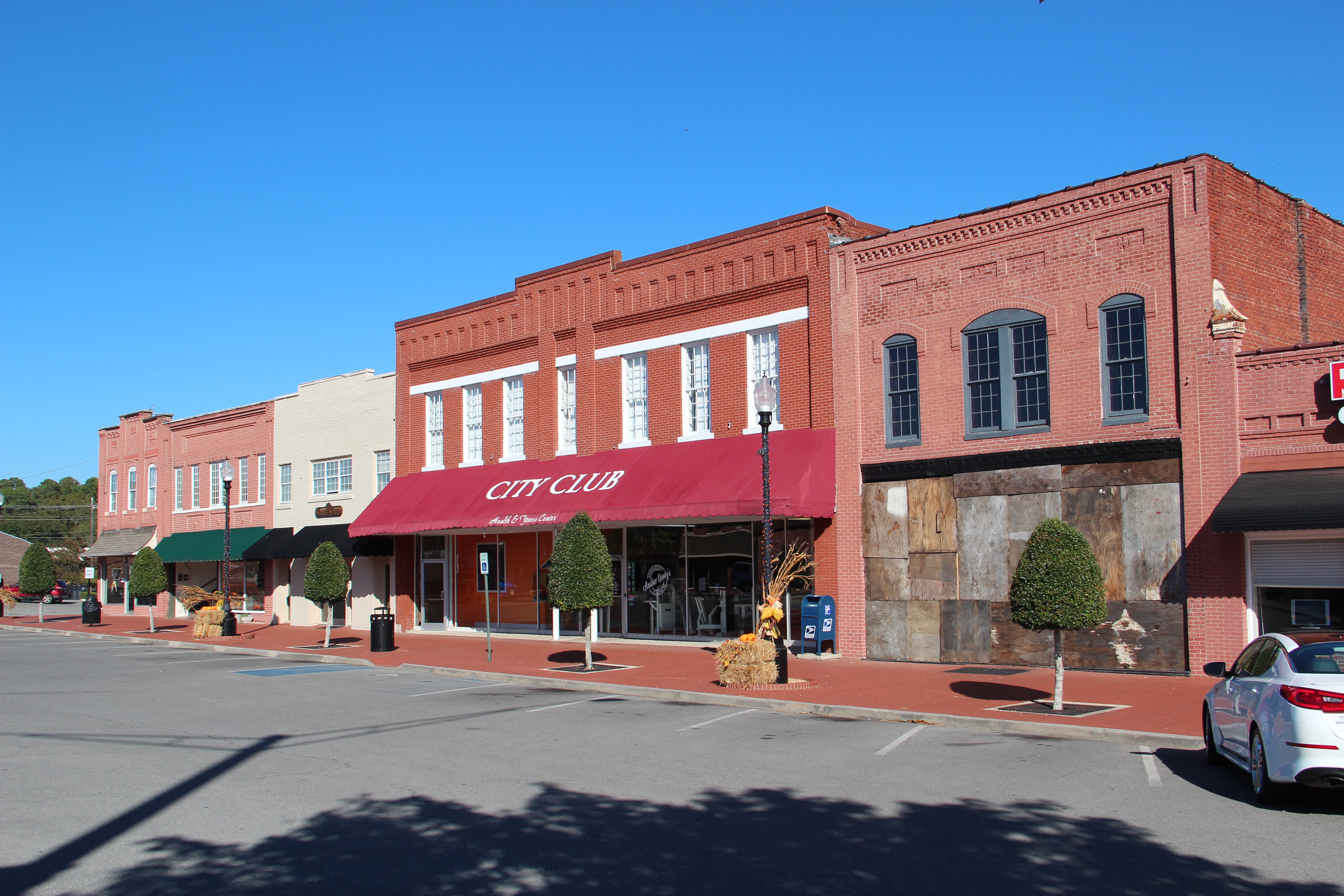
- Stores in downtown LaFayette

- Location in Walker County and the state of Georgia
- Coordinates: 34°42′35″N 85°17′2″W
- Country: United States
- State: Georgia
- County: Walker

Area
  - Total: 8.08 sq mi (20.94 km^{2})
  - Land: 8.08 sq mi (20.94 km^{2})
  - Water: 0 sq mi (0.00 km^{2})
- Elevation: 810 ft (247 m)

Population (2025)
  - Total: 7,157
  - Density: 851.9/sq mi (328.91/km^{2})
- Time zone: UTC-5 (Eastern (EST))
  - Summer (DST): UTC-4 (EDT)
- ZIP code: 30728
- Area codes: 706/762
- FIPS code: 13-44312
- GNIS feature ID: 0316521
- Website: mycityoflafayettega.org

LaFayette (/ləˈfɛt/ luh-FET) is a city in, and the county seat of, Walker County, Georgia, United States. As of the 2025 census, the city population was 7,157. It was founded as Chattooga.

LaFayette is part of the Chattanooga, TN-GA Metropolitan Statistical Area.

== History ==
LaFayette was founded as Chattooga, in 1835, as the seat of newly formed Walker County. The county was named after the former United States senator Freeman Walker. Chattooga was renamed LaFayette in 1836 after Gilbert du Motier, Marquis de Lafayette, the French aristocrat who fought in the American Revolutionary War. In 1864, the city became the site of the Battle of LaFayette during the Atlanta campaign of the American Civil War.

== Geography ==
LaFayette is located at 34°42′35″N 85°17′2″W (34.709704, -85.283862). According to the United States Census Bureau, the city has a total area of 8.1 square miles (21 km^{2}), all land.

== Demographics ==
Historical population
Census	Pop.	Note	%±
1870	251		—
1880	207		−17.5%
1890	377		82.1%
1900	491		30.2%
1910	1,590		223.8%
1920	2,104		32.3%
1930	2,811		33.6%
1940	3,509		24.8%
1950	4,884		39.2%
1960	5,588		14.4%
1970	6,044		8.2%
1980	6,517		7.8%
1990	6,313		−3.1%
2000	6,702		6.2%
2010	7,121		6.3%
2020	6,888		−3.3%
U.S. Decennial Census; 1850-1870 1870-1880; 1890-1910 1920-1930; 1940 1950 1960; 1970 1980 1990; 2000

=== 2020 & 2025 census ===
As of the 2025 census, LaFayette had a population of 7,157. The median age was 38.7 years. 22.3% of residents were under the age of 18 and 18.7% of residents were 65 years of age or older. For every 100 females there were 89.6 males, and for every 100 females age 18 and over there were 88.1 males age 18 and over.

96.0% of residents lived in urban areas, while 4.0% lived in rural areas.

There were 2,792 households in LaFayette, of which 30.1% had children under the age of 18 living in them. Of all households, 36.2% were married-couple households, 20.1% were households with a male householder and no spouse or partner present, and 36.3% were households with a female householder and no spouse or partner present. About 35.3% of all households were made up of individuals and 16.9% had someone living alone who was 65 years of age or older.

There were 3,153 housing units, of which 11.4% were vacant. The homeowner vacancy rate was 3.5% and the rental vacancy rate was 8.6%.

There were 1,844 families residing in the city.

LaFayette racial composition
Race	Num.	Perc.
White (non-Hispanic)	5,772	83.8%
Black or African American (non-Hispanic)	511	7.42%
Native American	33	0.48%
Asian	66	0.96%
Pacific Islander	5	0.07%
Other/Mixed	345	5.01%
Hispanic or Latino	156	2.26%

=== 2010 census ===
As of the census of 2010, there were 7,121 people, 2,712 households, and 1,749 families residing in the city. The population density was 871.6 inhabitants per square mile (336.5/km^{2}). There were 2,926 housing units at an average density of 361.6 units per square mile (139.6 units/km^{2}). The racial makeup of the city was 88.6% White, 7.5% African American, 0.04% Native American, 0.9% Asian, 0.01% Pacific Islander, 0.76% from other races, and 0.93% from two or more races. Hispanic or Latino of any race were 1.07% of the population.

There were 2,712 households, out of which 28.9% had children under the age of 18 living with them, 42.9% were married couples living together, 17.1% had a female householder with no husband present, and 35.7% were non-families. 32.6% of all households were made up of individuals, and 17.1% had someone living alone who was 65 years of age or older. The average household size was 2.33 and the average family size was 2.94.

In the city, the population was spread out, with 24.1% under the age of 18, 9.8% from 18 to 24, 25.4% from 25 to 44, 21.6% from 45 to 64, and 19.2% who were 65 years of age or older. The median age was 38 years. For every 100 females, there were 83.5 males. For every 100 females age 18 and over, there were 80.2 males.

The median income for a household in the city was $23,093, and the median income for a family was $29,387. Males had a median income of $27,528 versus $20,906 for females. The per capita income for the city was $15,318. About 16.0% of families and 27.2% of the population were below the poverty line, including 33.4% of those under age 18 and 15.7% of those age 65 or over.

== Notable people ==
- Andy Bean, golfer, repeat winner on both the PGA Tour and Champions Tour
- Ronald H. Griffith, United States Army General, former Vice Chief of Staff of the United States Army
- Zahra Karinshak, Georgia State Senator, attorney, and Air Force veteran
