= 2nd Artillery Regiment =

2nd Artillery Regiment may refer to:

== Australia ==
- 2/2nd Field Regiment (Australia)
- 2nd/10th Field Regiment, Royal Australian Artillery
- 2/2nd Anti-Tank Regiment (Australia)

== Italy ==
- 2nd Anti-Aircraft Artillery Regiment (Italy)
- 2nd Heavy Field Artillery Regiment (Italy)
- 2nd Mountain Artillery Regiment (Italy)

== United Kingdom ==
- 2nd Regiment Royal Horse Artillery
- 2nd Searchlight Regiment, Royal Artillery
- 2nd Welsh Brigade, Royal Field Artillery
- 2nd Cinque Ports Artillery Volunteers
- 2nd Devonshire Artillery Volunteers
- 2nd (Seaham) Durham Artillery Volunteer Corps
- 2nd East Riding Artillery Volunteers
- 2nd Glamorganshire Artillery Volunteers
- 2nd Kent Artillery Volunteers
- 2nd Middlesex Artillery Volunteers

== United States ==
- 2nd Air Defense Artillery Regiment
- 2nd Field Artillery Regiment (United States)
- 2nd Continental Artillery Regiment
- 2nd Connecticut Heavy Artillery Regiment
- 2nd Illinois Light Artillery Regiment
  - Battery A, 2nd Illinois Light Artillery Regiment
  - Battery B, 2nd Illinois Light Artillery Regiment
  - Battery C, 2nd Illinois Light Artillery Regiment
  - Battery D, 2nd Illinois Light Artillery Regiment
  - Battery E, 2nd Illinois Light Artillery Regiment
  - Battery F, 2nd Illinois Light Artillery Regiment
  - Battery G, 2nd Illinois Light Artillery Regiment
  - Battery H, 2nd Illinois Light Artillery Regiment
  - Battery I, 2nd Illinois Light Artillery Regiment
  - Battery K, 2nd Illinois Light Artillery Regiment
  - Battery L, 2nd Illinois Light Artillery Regiment
  - Battery M, 2nd Illinois Light Artillery Regiment
- 2nd Massachusetts Heavy Artillery Regiment
- 2nd Missouri Light Artillery Regiment
- 2nd New York Heavy Artillery Regiment
- 2nd Ohio Heavy Artillery Regiment
- 2nd Pennsylvania Heavy Artillery Regiment
- 2nd Tennessee Heavy Artillery Regiment (African Descent)

== Other countries ==
- 2nd Field Artillery Regiment (Belgium)
- 2nd Regiment, Royal Canadian Horse Artillery
- 2nd Field Artillery Regiment (Canada)
- 2 Medium Regiment (India)
- 2nd Guards Field Artillery Regiment, Prussia
