= Battery I, 1st Illinois Light Artillery Regiment =

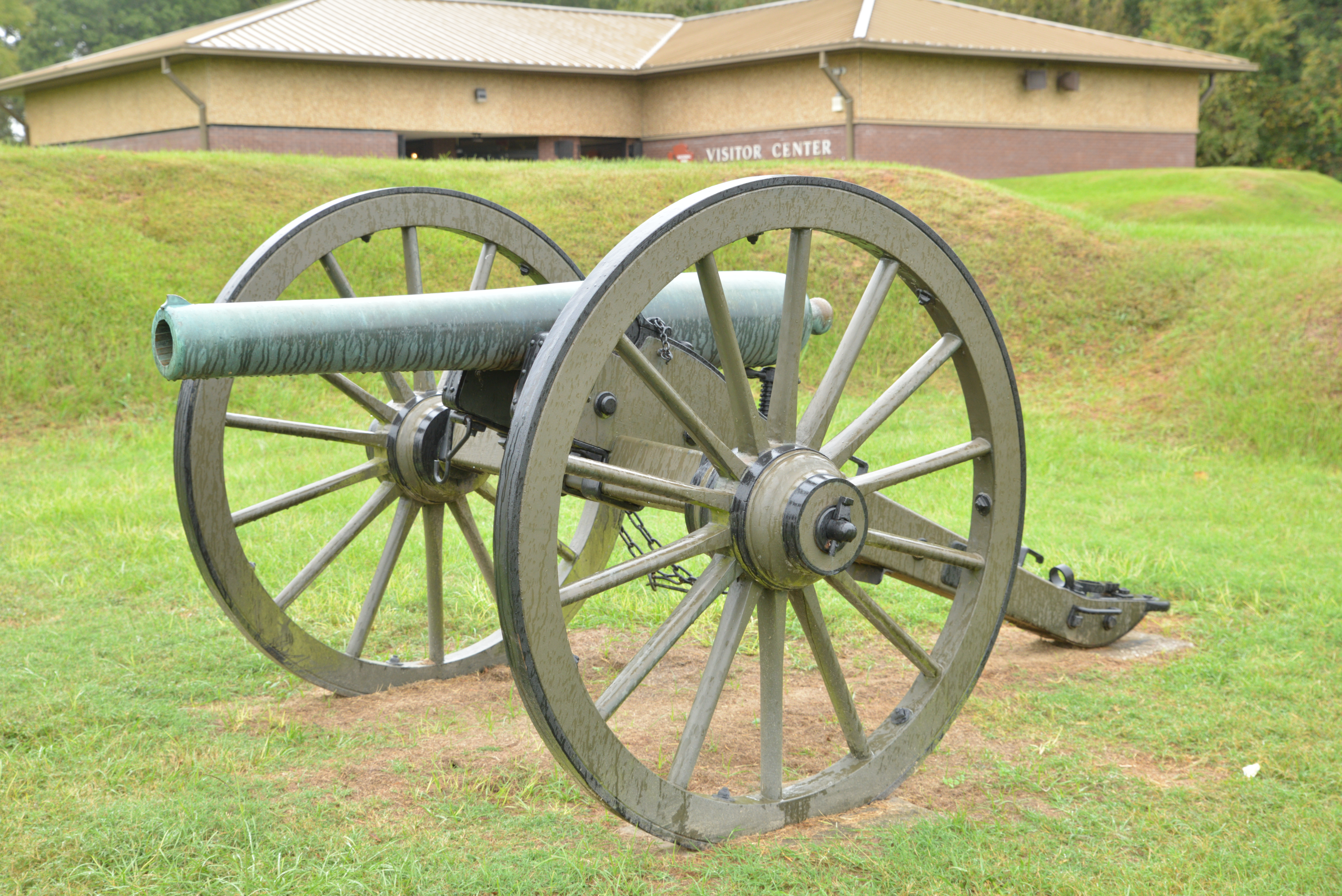
- 14-pounder James rifle at Vicksburg National Military Park
- Active: 10 Feb. 1862 – 26 July 1865
- Country: United States
- Allegiance: (United States) Union; Illinois
- Branch: Union Army
- Type: Field Artillery
- Size: Artillery Battery
- Equipment: 4 x 14-pounder James rifles
- Engagements: American Civil War; Battle of Shiloh (1862); Siege of Corinth (1862); Siege of Vicksburg (1863); Jackson Expedition (1863); Battle of Missionary Ridge (1863); Knoxville campaign (1863); Battle of Franklin (1864); Battle of Nashville (1864)

Commanders
- Notable commanders: Edward Bouton

Battery I, 1st Illinois Light Artillery Regiment was an artillery battery from Illinois that served in the Union Army during the American Civil War. The battery was organized in February 1862 at Chicago and within two months it fought at Shiloh. Later, the battery served at Corinth, Vicksburg, Jackson, Missionary Ridge, Knoxville, Franklin, and Nashville. The battery mustered out of Federal service in July 1865.

== Personnel ==
Battery I, 1st Illinois Light Artillery Regiment mustered into Federal service at Camp Douglas, Chicago on 10 February 1862. Its original officers were Captain Edward Bouton of Chicago, First Lieutenants Henry A. Rogers and Albert Cudney both of Chicago, and Second Lieutenants William M. Lansing of New York City, John C. Neeley of Belvidere, Illinois, and Joseph A. McCartney of Philadelphia. Cudney was promoted captain on 16 June 1863. Neeley was promoted captain on 10 February 1864. Neeley and Lansing became first lieutenants on 5 May 1862, and McCartney on 31 August 1863. Other second lieutenants were Elisha S. Russell, Robert Cowden, Steven Tart, and Henry Bennett.

Battery I was part of the 1st Illinois Light Artillery Regiment which organized at Chicago, Springfield, Ottawa, and Cairo, Illinois. There were 12 batteries named A–M, excluding J. The different batteries belonging to the regiment formed between 16 July 1861 (A and B) and 12 August 1862 (M), and enlisted for three years' service. Each battery served independently of the others. The regiment's original commander was Colonel Joseph Dana Webster.

First Lieutenant Rogers was promoted to captain of Battery "D", 1st Illinois Light Artillery Regiment on 5 May 1862. Captain Bouton was promoted to colonel of the 59th United States Colored Infantry Regiment on 28 June 1863. Second Lieutenant Robert Cowden was promoted major in the same regiment on 28 July 1863. First Lieutenant Lansing was promoted major of the 4th United States Colored Heavy Artillery Regiment on 3 September 1863. Captain Cudney resigned on 10 February 1864. By 23 March 1864, Captain Neeley commanded the battery and McCartney was first lieutenant. By 1 September 1864, Russell was first lieutenant and Tart and Bennett were second lieutenants. In January and February 1864, many soldiers re-enlisted and were classified as veterans. During the war 123 men enlisted as recruits, mostly in 1864.

== History ==
=== Shiloh to Vicksburg ===
Battery I traveled to Benton Barracks at St Louis, Missouri on 1 March 1862. From there they moved to Pittsburg Landing, Tennessee on 1–4 April 1862. At the Battle of Shiloh on 6–7 April 1862, the battery was with Ulysses S. Grant's Army of the Tennessee but unassigned to any division or brigade. Captain Bouton was in command. On the first day, the battery joined two other newly arrived and unassigned units, the 15th Iowa and 16th Iowa Volunteer Infantry Regiments. At first they took position at Pittsburg Landing where they faced a horde of panicky stragglers from the battle. Grant then sent the Iowa regiments forward to support John A. McClernand's division. Later in the day, Grant's chief of staff Colonel Webster began placing available artillery units on the final defense line. These included Battery "B", 2nd Illinois Light Artillery Regiment, 8th Ohio Battery, Battery "H", 1st Illinois Light Artillery Regiment, and Battery I. Webster massed most of his guns at the landing, but sent Battery I to the right flank to hold the Snake Creek bridge until Lew Wallace's division arrived. Captain Bouton reported that the horses assigned to the battery had never been harnessed, so they could not be used to haul the guns. Instead, the men had to drag the guns into position.

Battery I started Shiloh's second day with McClernand's division. During the early fighting, Alexander M. McCook's Army of the Ohio division converged with McClernand's troops, passing in front of them. Nevertheless, McClernand positioned Battery I at the edge of Woolf Field. Soon Battery I was in the front line alongside McCook's 29th Indiana, 30th Indiana, and 34th Illinois Infantry Regiments. McCook's troops came under heavy attack and Battery I retreated, leaving two guns behind. Captain Bouton reported that the guns could not be hauled away because the horses were not "drilled sufficiently to stand fire". The abandoned guns were recaptured by the infantry.

After Shiloh, Battery I was assigned to the 5th Division, Army of the Tennessee through July 1862. The battery took part in the advance upon and Siege of Corinth from 29 April–30 May. The unit was in action at Russell House on 17 May. After Corinth, the battery marched to Memphis, Tennessee from 1 June–21 July. From that date until November 1862, the unit was part of Artillery, 5th Division, District of Memphis. Battery I was assigned to 1st Division, Right Wing, XIII Corps in November–December 1862. 1st Division was transferred to XVII Corps in December 1862–January 1863. During this period, the battery participated in Grant's Central Mississippi campaign. Subsequently, the unit transferred again to 1st Division, XVI Corps in January–June 1863. The battery spent these months guarding the railroad in and around Memphis, except on 11 May when it was in action at Wall Hill.

Battery I moved from Memphis on 6–11 June 1863 to join the Siege of Vicksburg. The siege was successfully concluded on 4 July. During the siege, the battery was commanded by Lieutenant Lansing and reported to William Sooy Smith who led the 1st Division and Cadwallader C. Washburn who led the XVI Corps contingent. The battery took part in the Jackson Expedition, marching to Jackson, Mississippi on 4–10 July and laying siege to the city on 10–17 July. One source asserted that the unit served in the 4th Division, XV Corps from July 1863 to April 1864. Another authority stated that W. S. Smith's 1st Division changed its designation to 4th Division, XV Corps in September 1863. Battery I guarded the Big Black River until 25 September when it traveled to Memphis. The battery moved to Chattanooga, Tennessee between then and 23 November. During that period, the unit took part in operations on the Memphis and Charleston Railroad in northern Alabama on 20–29 October.

=== Chattanooga to Nashville ===
Battle of Nashville, 15–16 December 1864

Battery I took part in the Chattanooga campaign on 23–27 November 1863, including fighting at Tunnel Hill on 24–25 November which was part of the Battle of Missionary Ridge. During the battle, the battery was led by Lieutenant Josiah H. Burton and reported to the 4th Division under Hugh Boyle Ewing and XV Corps under Francis Preston Blair Jr. Burton was temporarily assigned from Battery "F", 1st Illinois Light Artillery Regiment. The unit participated in the pursuit to Graysville, Georgia on 26–27 November. Battery I marched to the relief of Knoxville, Tennessee from 28 November–9 December. Afterward, the battery guarded Scottsboro, Alabama until April 1864. At that time, the unit moved to Nashville, Tennessee where it formed part of the artillery reserve of the city's garrison until November 1864.

In November 1864, Battery I transferred to Artillery, 5th Division, Cavalry Corps, Military Division of the Mississippi, and remained in that formation through July 1865. According to Frederick H. Dyer, the battery took part in operations in Tennessee and Alabama, including Columbia, Tennessee on 24–28 November and the Battle of Franklin on 30 November. However, Battery I does not appear in the Official Records for that period. The battery fought at the Battle of Nashville on 15–16 December under the command of Lieutenant McCartney. It was the only artillery unit in Edward Hatch's 5th Cavalry Division, James H. Wilson's Cavalry Corps. On the first day, Hatch's division was on the army's extreme right flank, with R. R. Stewart's brigade on the right and Datus E. Coon's brigade on the left. The divisional battery (Battery I) operated with Coon's brigade. At 2:15 pm, Hatch ordered Coon's dismounted troopers to attack Redoubt 5. Joined by William L. McMillen's infantry brigade from Andrew Jackson Smith's XVI Corps and supported by the fire from four artillery batteries, Coon's troops overran the redoubt. Coon's and McMillen's men then captured Redoubt 4 before collapsing with exhaustion. With the defense line compromised, other Union soldiers then stormed Redoubts 1, 2, and 3, breaking the Confederate line. (Note: A. J. Smith's command was officially known as Detachment, Army of the Tennessee. According to Boatner (p.196), unofficially it was known by its former name XVI Corps.)

On the second day, Coon's brigade pressed the opposing cavalry so hard that it was reinforced by an infantry brigade. Hatch ordered the guns from his divisional artillery (Battery I) to be dragged up a nearby hill. With artillery support, Coon's troopers drove off the Confederate defenders at 3:00 pm. At 4:30 pm, Coon's brigade assaulted Shy's Hill from the south while John McArthur's division of A. J. Smith's corps attacked the hill from the north. Helped by enfilading fire from Hatch's battery (not named in the report, but presumably Battery I), the assault was successful and the Confederate line collapsed. McArthur's troops captured 4,273 prisoners and 24 cannons.

Battery I pursued the Confederate army, taking part in actions at West Harpeth River on 17 December 1864, Rutherford Creek on 19 December, Lynnville and Rockland Creek on 24 December, and Anthony's Gap near Pulaski, Tennessee on 25 December. Subsequently, it was stationed at Huntsville, Alabama, Florence, Alabama, Eastport, Mississippi, Iuka, Mississippi, and Gravelly Springs, Alabama until July 1865. The battery traveled to Chicago and mustered out on 26 July 1865. During its service one enlisted man was killed and 13 enlisted men died by disease, for 14 total fatalities.

== Armament ==
In 2nd Quarter 1863, Battery I reported being armed with four 14-pounder James rifles, which were also known as 3.8-inch rifles. The battery reported having the following 3.8-inch James ammunition: 64 solid shot, 320 common shell, and 256 canister shot. The battery reported having the following sidearms: three cavalry sabers and 11 Navy revolvers. The 3rd Quarter 1863 ammunition report was identical, except that there were 214 shells. The 4th Quarter 1863 ammunition report noted that there were 515 gunpowder cartridges.

== See also ==
- List of Illinois Civil War units

== Notes ==
Footnotes

Citations
