= Battery B, 2nd Illinois Light Artillery Regiment =

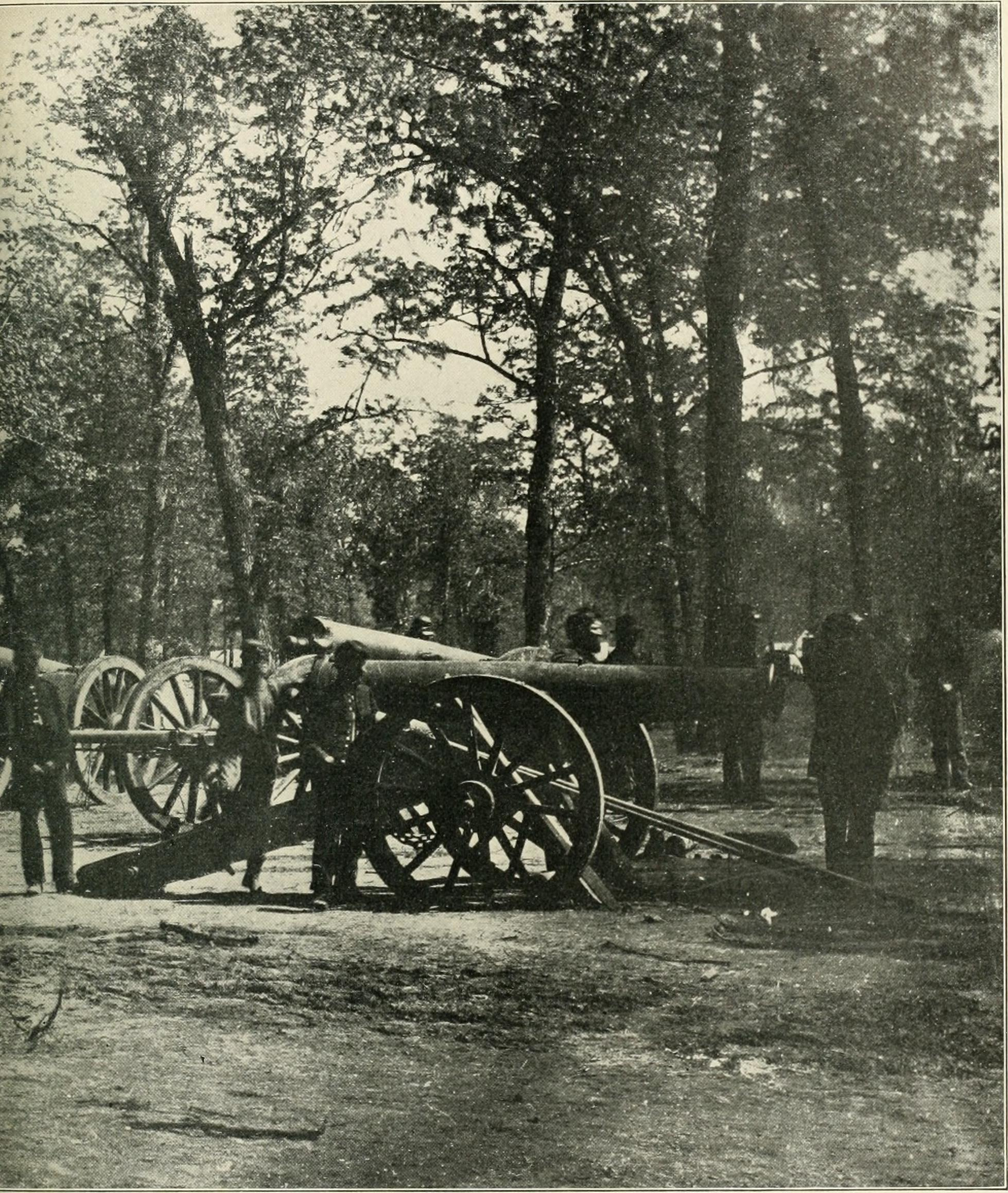
- 24-pounder siege cannons of Battery B, 2nd Illinois Light Artillery on the Shiloh battlefield
- Active: 20 June 1861 – 15 July 1865
- Country: United States
- Allegiance: (United States) Union; Illinois
- Branch: Union Army
- Type: Field Artillery
- Size: Artillery Battery
- Equipment: 4 × 24-pounder cannons and 1 × 8-inch howitzer (Apr. 1862)
- Engagements: American Civil War; Battle of Shiloh (1862); Siege of Corinth (1862); Second Battle of Corinth (1862); Battle of Brices Cross Roads (1864)

Commanders
- Notable commanders: Relly Madison; Fletcher H. Chapman

Battery B, 2nd Illinois Light Artillery Regiment was an artillery battery from Illinois that served in the Union Army during the American Civil War. The battery was organized in June 1861. It fought at Shiloh, First Corinth, and Second Corinth in 1862. Subsequently, the unit garrisoned Corinth, Mississippi, until January 1864. It was stationed at Memphis, Tennessee, until June 1864 when it fought at Brices Cross Roads. The battery garrisoned Memphis until it was mustered out in July 1865.

== Personnel ==
Battery B, 2nd Illinois Artillery Regiment was organized at Springfield, Illinois and mustered into Federal service on 20 June 1861. The original officers were Captain Relly Madison of Marshall, First Lieutenants Thomas E. Dawson and Wilson Gard of Martinsville, and Second Lieutenants Jeremiah Crane and Richard Gard of Casey. Other ranks were Quartermaster Edward W. Ross, eight sergeants, eight corporals, and 69 privates. From 1861 through 1865, 160 additional men were recruited as privates. Of the privates, 25 would re-enlist as veterans in February and March 1864. Dawson mustered out in November 1861, returned as first lieutenant on 9 December 1862, and resigned on 17 January 1865. W. Gard mustered out on 25 March 1862. Fletcher H. Chapman of Carlinville joined as first lieutenant on 18 March 1862. R. Gard resigned on 21 January 1862 and Crane mustered out on 25 March 1862. They were replaced by Second Lieutenants Frank Allaire and Augustus Hoyer.

Battery B was part of the 2nd Illinois Light Artillery Regiment which organized at Camp Douglas in Chicago, Camp Butler in Springfield, Peoria, St. Charles, and Cairo, Illinois. There were 12 batteries named A–M, excluding J. The different batteries belonging to the regiment formed between 17 August 1861 and 6 June 1862, and enlisted for three years' service. Chapman's artillery company of the 14th Illinois Infantry Regiment was consolidated with Battery B in April 1862. Each battery served independently of the others. The regiment's original commander was Colonel Thomas S. Mather.

Captain Madison died of disease at Corinth, Mississippi, on 11 April 1863. He was replaced as captain by Chapman on 18 April 1863. Allaire resigned on 17 December 1862. Hoyer was promoted first lieutenant on 9 December 1862 and was discharged on 29 December 1864. Quartermaster Ross was promoted second lieutenant on 9 December 1862 and resigned on 20 June 1864. James M. Pence joined as second lieutenant on 14 December 1862 and was promoted first lieutenant on 29 December 1864. Alfred C. Lovejoy joined as second lieutenant on 20 June 1864. Private Benjamin Bull was killed in action at the Battle of Brices Cross Roads on 10 June 1864 and Private John Craig died at Andersonville Prison on 22 January 1865. Two soldiers were discharged to join the 1st Alabama Cavalry with promotions.

== History ==
Until April 1862 Battery B was assigned to the Department of the Missouri and was on duty there. On 1–4 April 1862, the battery moved up the Tennessee River to Pittsburg Landing, Tennessee, and fought at the Battle of Shiloh on 6–7 April. The Shiloh order of battle shows Battery B among the unassigned units of Ulysses S. Grant's Army of the Tennessee.

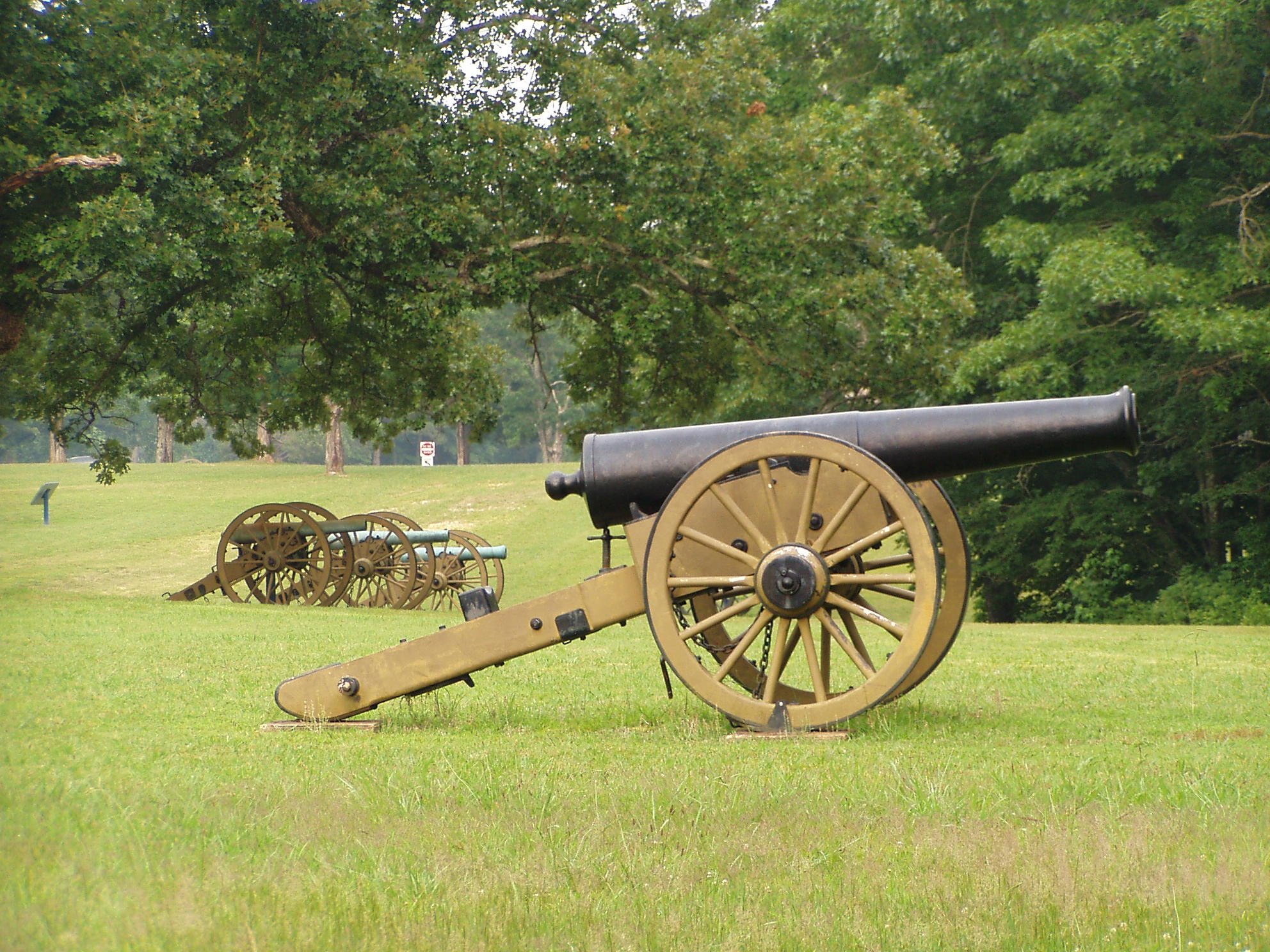
24-pounder gun located on Grant's final line, Shiloh National Military Park.

As the Union soldiers were driven back on the first day of Shiloh, Grant ordered his chief of staff Joseph D. Webster to organize a final line of defense covering Pittsburg Landing. A gunner by training, Webster built the defenses around artillery units. The heavy guns of Battery B were still on a river transport, intended for the expected siege of Corinth, but Webster ordered the guns ashore. The battery was armed with at least four 24-pounder cannons, named Old Abe, Dick Yates, Secretary Hatch, and Jesse DuBois, plus one 8-inch howitzer. The big guns were never intended to be used as field artillery, but their large caliber could be expected to have a strong psychological impact. The guns were positioned to command the Dill Branch ravine and the flat area near the Corinth Road. Webster also deployed three more just-arrived artillery units: the 8th Ohio Battery, Battery H, 1st Illinois, and Battery I, 1st Illinois. As withdrawing artillery batteries appeared, Webster inserted them into his final defense line until there were about 50 guns. James R. Chalmers led the only Confederate brigade to make a serious assault on the final line. Gage's Alabama Battery, Chalmers' supporting artillery, was hit so hard by Union cannon fire that it was forced to retreat. Chalmers' infantry were then stopped by withering artillery fire.

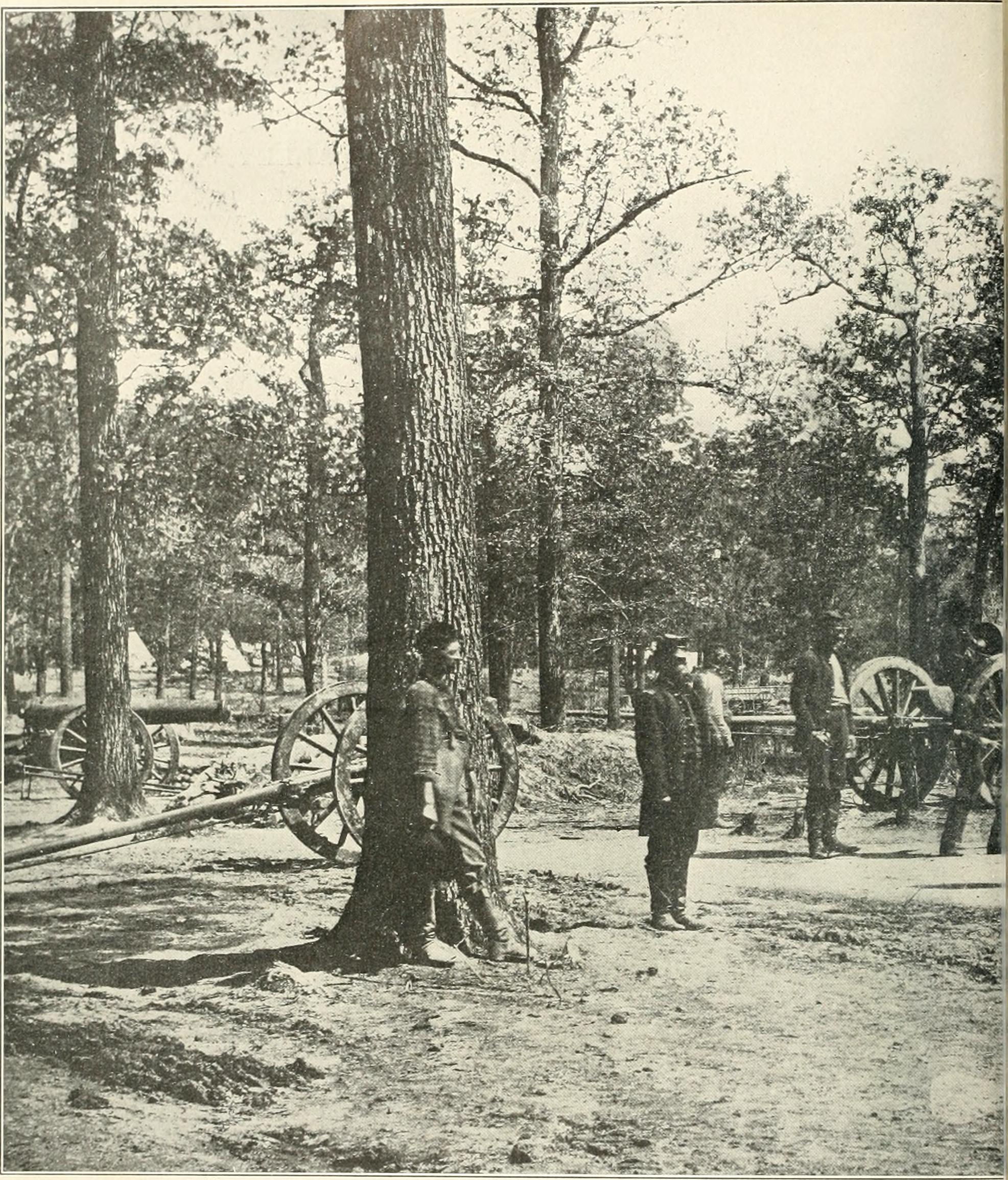
Battery B after the Battle of Shiloh

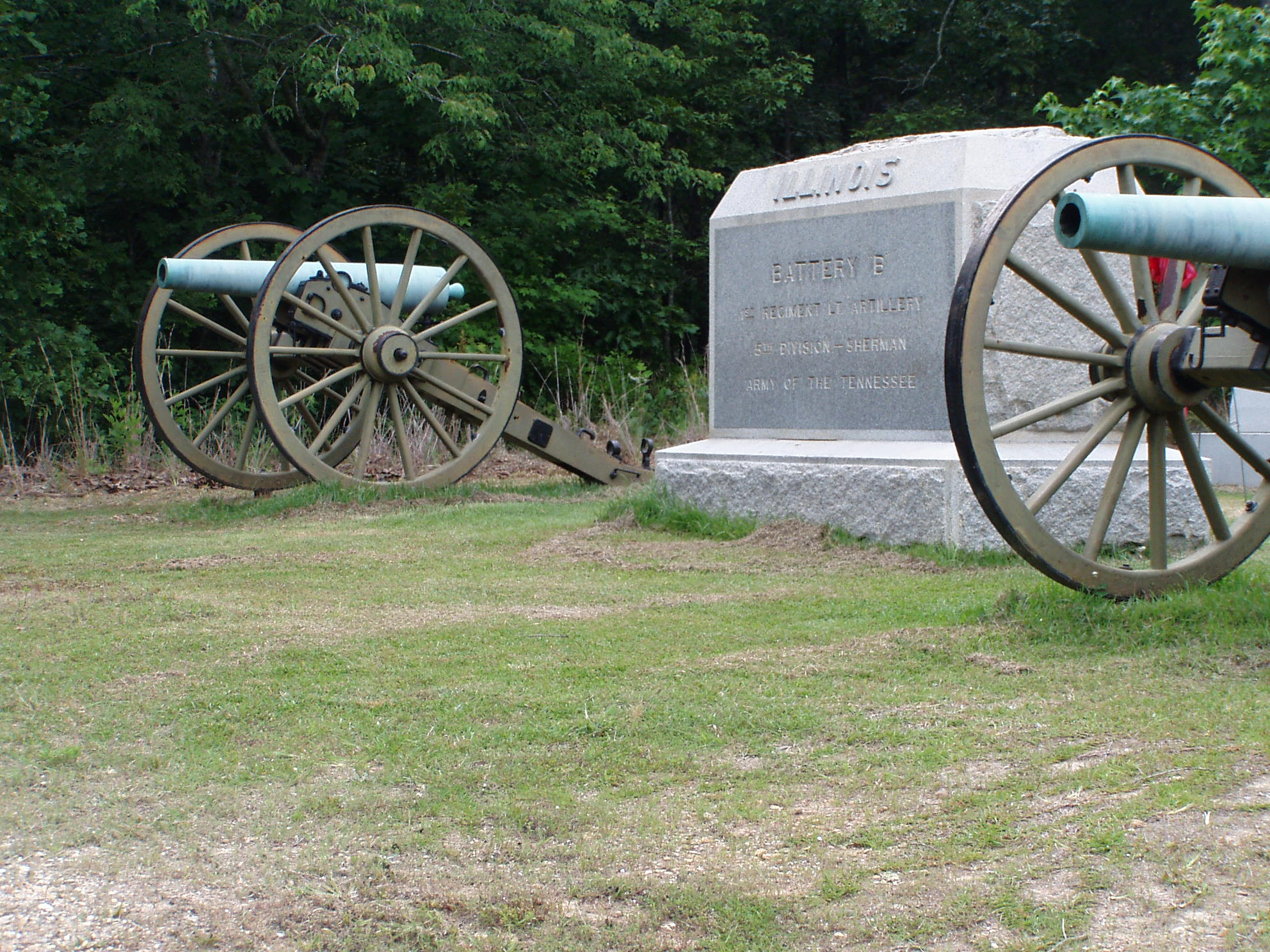
Battery B memorial at Shiloh National Military Park.

Battery B was assigned to Unattached Artillery, Army of the Tennessee in April–May 1862. During this period, the unit participated in the advance to and Siege of Corinth from 29 April to 30 May. Afterward, the battery was assigned to 4th Division, Army of the Tennessee through July 1862. Then it was assigned to 1st Division, District of Jackson, Tennessee, until November 1862. The battery performed garrison duty until October 1862. It fought in the Second Battle of Corinth on 3–4 October. On the second day, after the Confederate assault broke into the town, the Union soldiers counterattacked. Battery B was positioned on the east edge of town and began firing blindly toward a location supposed to be occupied by Confederates. Unfortunately, the Union counterattack pushed their enemies back 150 yd (137 m) and became the target of friendly fire from Battery B, which inflicted "dozens" of casualties. Union General Thomas Alfred Davies was nearly hit by this cannon fire. A map of the battle shows "Battery Madison" to the southeast of Corinth.

Battery B performed garrison duty at Corinth through January 1864, though the organization to which it was assigned changed several times. In November–December 1862, Battery B was assigned to District of Jackson, XIII Corps. In December 1862–January 1863, the unit became part of District of Corinth, XVII Corps. In January–March 1863, the battery was assigned to District of Corinth, XVI Corps. In March–November 1863, Battery B was part of Artillery, 2nd Division, XVI Corps. In November 1863–January 1864, the unit belonged to the Post of Corinth, XVI Corps. On 25 January 1864, the battery was ordered to march to Memphis, Tennessee, and in January–April 1864 it was assigned to Fort Pickering, Post of Memphis. The unit took part in an expedition to Wyatt's, Mississippi on 6–18 February 1864. The battery belonged to Artillery, 1st Division, XVI Corps in April–June 1864 even though it was still in Fort Pickering's garrison.

Battery B was assigned to the 2nd Brigade of the expedition of Samuel D. Sturgis on 1–13 June 1864. The battery fought at the Battle of Brices Cross Roads (or Tishamingo Creek) on 10 June. Sturgis led 4,800 infantry, 3,300 cavalry, 400 artillerymen, and 22 guns. Sturgis was opposed by Nathan Bedford Forrest who realized he was badly outnumbered, but determined to attack the Union column in an area where the roads were bad and the undergrowth was heavy. Forrest expected his cavalrymen to make short work of the Union infantry who would be worn out by marching in hot weather. By mid-morning, Forrest's lead brigade was skirmishing with Benjamin Grierson's Union cavalry. As more of Forrest's troops arrived, Grierson began calling for help from the infantry. When 3,600 exhausted Union infantry arrived with their three supporting batteries, Forrest launched a heavy attack with his dismounted cavalry and finally defeated them. The Union retreat became a rout when the troops had to cross a bridge over Tishamingo Creek. Sturgis admitted losing 2,612 casualties, 18 guns, and 250 wagons while Forrest reported 493 casualties. Chapman's battery was reported to have four artillery pieces. (Note: Presumably, by this time Battery B was rearmed with proper field artillery pieces, though the sources do not say what they were.) When it reached the field, Battery B was positioned at the crossroads where it fired shell at the enemy with the fuses cut to three or five seconds. On the orders of Colonel William L. McMillen, one cannon was advanced 400 yd (370 m) along the road. This gun, together with two caissons, was captured by the Confederates. The other three guns and the remaining caissons were later abandoned in the swamp, though the horses were saved. Captain J. A. Fitch commanding Battery E, 1st Illinois Light Artillery Regiment (four 12-pounder Napoleons) reported that most of the Union artillery was able to leave the battlefield, but after traveling a few miles, a swampy bottom was encountered where wheeled vehicles could not get through. After failing to get through, at 1:00 am Fitch and the other battery captains abandoned their cannons after spiking them, smashing the wheel spokes, and throwing the ammunition into the swamp. Battery B went into the battle with three officers and 74 enlisted men. Losses were one enlisted man killed, one officer and two enlisted men wounded, and two enlisted men missing.

Battery B was assigned to the Post of Memphis, District of West Tennessee from June 1864–July 1865. Duties were performed at Memphis and in the District of West Tennessee. The soldiers in Battery B were mustered out on 15 July 1865. During its service, 30 men died: three enlisted men were killed or mortally wounded and 27 enlisted men died by disease.

== See also ==
- List of Illinois Civil War units

== Notes ==
Footnotes

Citations
