= Battery G, 1st Illinois Light Artillery Regiment =

- Active: February 28, 1862 - July 24, 1865
- Country: United States
- Allegiance: Union
- Branch: Artillery
- Engagements: Battle of Island Number 10; Siege of Corinth; Second Battle of Corinth

Battery G, 1st Illinois Light Artillery Regiment, was an artillery battery that served in the Union Army during the American Civil War. The battery was also known as O'Leary's Battery and Rombauer's Battery.

== Service ==
Battery G was organized in Cairo, Illinois and mustered in February 28, 1862, for a three-year enlistment under the command of Captain Arthur O'Leary.

The battery was attached to Flotilla Brigade, Army of the Mississippi, to April 1862. Artillery Division, Army of the Mississippi, to July 1862. Artillery, District of Corinth, Mississippi, to November 1862. Artillery, District of Corinth, XIII Corps, Department of the Tennessee, to December 1862. Artillery, District of Corinth, XVII Corps, to January 1863. Artillery, District of Corinth, XVI Corps, to March 1863. Artillery, 2nd Division, XVI Corps, to November 1863. Post of Corinth, Mississippi, XVI Corps, to January 1864. Fort Pickering, District of Memphis, XVI Corps, to June 1864. 1st Brigade, Post and Defenses of Memphis, District of West Tennessee, to December 1864. Artillery Reserve, District of West Tennessee, to July 1865.

Battery G mustered out of service July 24, 1865.

== Detailed service ==
Moved to Columbus, Kentucky, March 18, then to Island No. 10, Mississippi River. Operations against Island No. 10, Mississippi River, and garrison at New Madrid, Missouri, March 20-April 11, 1862. Union City, Tennessee, March 31. Action and capture at Tipton April 8. Moved to Columbus, Kentucky, April 11. Expedition to Fort Pillow, Tennessee, April 13–17. Moved to Hamburg Landing, Tennessee, April 17–22. Advance on and siege of Corinth, Mississippi, April 29-May 30. Occupation of Corinth and pursuit to Booneville May 30-June 12. Duty at Corinth, Mississippi, until January 1864. Battle of Corinth October 3–4, 1862. Moved to Memphis, Tennessee, January 1864, and duty there in the defenses of that city and in the District of West Tennessee until July 1865.

== Casualties ==
The battery lost a total of 12 men during service; 1 enlisted men killed, 11 enlisted men died of disease.

== Commanders ==
- Captain Arthur O'Leary - discharged August 21, 1862
- Captain Ralph G. Rombauer - promoted to major
- Captain William N. Taylor - promoted from 1st lieutenant April 1, 1865, but never mustered

== See also ==
- List of Illinois Civil War units
- Illinois in the Civil War
