= 108th Illinois Infantry Regiment =

108th Regiment Illinois Volunteer Infantry
- Active: August 28, 1862 - August 5, 1865
- Country: United States
- Allegiance: Union
- Branch: Infantry
- Engagements: Yazoo Pass Expedition; Battle of Chickasaw Bayou; Battle of Arkansas Post; Battle of Port Gibson; Battle of Champion Hill; Battle of Fort Blakeley

The 108th Illinois Volunteer Infantry was an infantry regiment in the Union Army during the American Civil War.

== Service ==
The 108th Illinois Infantry was organized in Peoria, Illinois, and mustered in for three years service on August 28, 1862, under the command of Colonel John Warner.

The regiment was attached to the following:

2nd Brigade, 1st Division, Army of Kentucky, Department of the Ohio, to November 1862.

2nd Brigade, 10th Division, XIII Corps, Department of the Tennessee, to December 1862.

2nd Brigade, 1st Division, Sherman's Yazoo Expedition, to January 1863.

2nd Brigade, 10th Division, XIII Corps, Army of the Tennessee, to May 1863.

Detached Brigade, District of Northeast Louisiana, to August 1863.

1st Brigade, 2nd Division, XVI Corps, to November 1863.

Post of Corinth, Mississippi, 2nd Division, XVI Corps, to January 1864.

2nd Brigade, District of Memphis, Tennessee, to June 1864.

2nd Brigade, Sturgis' Expedition, June 1864.

1st Brigade, Memphis, Tennessee, District of West Tennessee, to February 1865.

3rd Brigade, 3rd Division, XVI Corps, Military Division of West Mississippi, to August 1865.

The 108th Illinois Infantry mustered out of service on August 5, 1865, at Vicksburg, Mississippi.

== Detailed service ==
Moved to Nicholasville, Kentucky, October 17-November 1, 1862.

Marched to Louisville, Kentucky, November 14–19, 1862.

Moved to Memphis, Tennessee, November 21–26, and duty there until December 20.

Sherman's Yazoo Expedition December 20, 1862, to January 2, 1863.

Chickasaw Bayou December 26–28, 1862.

Chickasaw Bluff December 29.

Expedition to Arkansas Post, Arkansas, January 3–10, 1863.

Assault and capture of Fort Hindman, Arkansas Post, January 10–11.

Moved to Young's Point, Louisiana, January 17–24, and duty there until March 10.

At Milliken's Bend, Louisiana, until April 25.

Movement on Bruinsburg and turning Grand Gulf April 25–30.

Battles of Port Gibson, Mississippi, May 1.

Champion Hill May 16.

Detached to guard prisoners from Big Black River to Memphis, Tennessee, May 16–30.

At Young's Point, Louisiana, during siege of Vicksburg and until July 18.

Moved to Vicksburg July 18.

Memphis, Tennessee, July 26–29.

LaGrange, Tennessee, August 5. Duty there until October 28.

Pocahontas until November 9.

At Corinth, Mississippi, until January 25, 1864.

Moved to Memphis, Tennessee, and duty there until February 1865.

Sturgis' Expedition to Guntown, Mississippi, June 1–13, 1864.

Brice's (or Tishamingo) Creek, near Guntown, June 10.

Ripley June 11. Repulse of Forrest's attack on Memphis August 21, 1864.

Moved to New Orleans, Louisiana, then to Dauphin Island, Alabama, February 28-March 16.

Operations against Mobile and its defenses March 16-April 12.

Siege of Spanish Fort and Fort Blakely March 26-April 8.

Assault and capture of Fort Blakely April 9.

Occupation of Mobile April 12.

March to Montgomery April 13–25, and duty there until July 18.

Moved to Vicksburg, Mississippi, July 18-August 5.

== Casualties ==
The regiment lost a total of 214 men during service; 1 officer and 8 enlisted men killed or mortally wounded, 3 officers and 202 enlisted men died of disease.

== Commanders ==
- Colonel John Warner - dismissed from the service March 13, 1863
- Colonel Charles Turner

== See also ==
- List of Illinois Civil War units
- Illinois in the Civil War
