= List of Illinois units in the American Civil War =

== Infantry units ==
In recognition of Illinois’ six regiments' service in the Mexican War, regimental numbers for infantry in the Civil War began at seven.

- 7th Illinois Infantry Regiment
- 8th Illinois Infantry Regiment
- 9th Illinois Infantry Regiment
- 10th Illinois Infantry Regiment
- 11th Illinois Infantry Regiment
- 12th Illinois Infantry Regiment
- 13th Illinois Infantry Regiment
- 14th Illinois Infantry Regiment
- 15th Illinois Infantry Regiment
- 16th Illinois Infantry Regiment
- 17th Illinois Infantry Regiment
- 18th Illinois Infantry Regiment
- 19th Illinois Infantry Regiment
- 20th Illinois Infantry Regiment
- 21st Illinois Infantry Regiment
- 22nd Illinois Infantry Regiment
- 23rd Illinois Infantry Regiment
- 24th Illinois Infantry Regiment
- 25th Illinois Infantry Regiment
- 26th Illinois Infantry Regiment
- 27th Illinois Infantry Regiment
- 28th Illinois Infantry Regiment
- 29th Illinois Infantry Regiment
- 29th United States Colored Infantry Regiment
- 30th Illinois Infantry Regiment
- 31st Illinois Infantry Regiment
- 32nd Illinois Infantry Regiment
- 33rd Illinois Infantry Regiment
- 34th Illinois Infantry Regiment
- 35th Illinois Infantry Regiment
- 36th Illinois Infantry Regiment
- 37th Illinois Infantry Regiment
- 38th Illinois Infantry Regiment
- 39th Illinois Infantry Regiment
- 40th Illinois Infantry Regiment
- 41st Illinois Infantry Regiment
- 42nd Illinois Infantry Regiment
- 43rd Illinois Infantry Regiment
- 44th Illinois Infantry Regiment
- 45th Illinois Infantry Regiment
- 46th Illinois Infantry Regiment
- 47th Illinois Infantry Regiment
- 48th Illinois Infantry Regiment
- 49th Illinois Infantry Regiment
- 50th Illinois Infantry Regiment
- 51st Illinois Infantry Regiment
- 52nd Illinois Infantry Regiment
- 53rd Illinois Infantry Regiment
- 54th Illinois Infantry Regiment
- 55th Illinois Infantry Regiment
- 56th Illinois Infantry Regiment
- 57th Illinois Infantry Regiment
- 58th Illinois Infantry Regiment
- 59th Illinois Infantry Regiment
- 60th Illinois Infantry Regiment
- 61st Illinois Infantry Regiment
- 62nd Illinois Infantry Regiment
- 63rd Illinois Infantry Regiment
- 64th Illinois Infantry Regiment
- 65th Illinois Infantry Regiment
- 66th Illinois Infantry Regiment
- 67th Illinois Infantry Regiment
- 68th Illinois Infantry Regiment
- 69th Illinois Infantry Regiment
- 70th Illinois Infantry Regiment
- 71st Illinois Infantry Regiment
- 72nd Illinois Infantry Regiment
- 73rd Illinois Infantry Regiment
- 74th Illinois Infantry Regiment
- 75th Illinois Infantry Regiment
- 76th Illinois Infantry Regiment
- 77th Illinois Infantry Regiment
- 78th Illinois Infantry Regiment
- 79th Illinois Volunteer Infantry Regiment
- 80th Illinois Volunteer Infantry Regiment
- 81st Illinois Volunteer Infantry Regiment
- 82nd Illinois Volunteer Infantry Regiment
- 83rd Illinois Volunteer Infantry Regiment
- 84th Illinois Volunteer Infantry Regiment
- 85th Illinois Volunteer Infantry Regiment
- 86th Illinois Volunteer Infantry Regiment
- 87th Illinois Volunteer Infantry Regiment
- 88th Illinois Volunteer Infantry Regiment
- 89th Illinois Volunteer Infantry Regiment
- 90th Illinois Volunteer Infantry Regiment
- 91st Illinois Volunteer Infantry Regiment
- 92nd Illinois Volunteer Infantry Regiment
- 93rd Illinois Volunteer Infantry Regiment
- 94th Illinois Volunteer Infantry Regiment
- 95th Illinois Volunteer Infantry Regiment
- 96th Illinois Volunteer Infantry Regiment
- 97th Illinois Volunteer Infantry Regiment
- 98th Illinois Volunteer Infantry Regiment
- 99th Illinois Volunteer Infantry Regiment
- 100th Illinois Volunteer Infantry Regiment
- 101st Illinois Volunteer Infantry Regiment
- 102nd Illinois Volunteer Infantry Regiment
- 103rd Illinois Volunteer Infantry Regiment
- 104th Illinois Volunteer Infantry Regiment
- 105th Illinois Volunteer Infantry Regiment
- 106th Illinois Volunteer Infantry Regiment
- 107th Illinois Volunteer Infantry Regiment
- 108th Illinois Volunteer Infantry Regiment
- 109th Illinois Volunteer Infantry Regiment
- 110th Illinois Volunteer Infantry Regiment
- 111th Illinois Volunteer Infantry Regiment
- 112th Illinois Volunteer Infantry Regiment
- 113th Illinois Volunteer Infantry Regiment
- 114th Illinois Volunteer Infantry Regiment
- 115th Illinois Volunteer Infantry Regiment
- 116th Illinois Volunteer Infantry Regiment
- 117th Illinois Volunteer Infantry Regiment
- 118th Illinois Volunteer Infantry Regiment
- 119th Illinois Volunteer Infantry Regiment
- 120th Illinois Volunteer Infantry Regiment
- 122nd Illinois Volunteer Infantry Regiment
- 123rd Illinois Volunteer Infantry Regiment
- 124th Illinois Volunteer Infantry Regiment
- 125th Illinois Volunteer Infantry Regiment
- 126th Illinois Volunteer Infantry Regiment
- 127th Illinois Volunteer Infantry Regiment
- 128th Illinois Volunteer Infantry Regiment
- 129th Illinois Volunteer Infantry Regiment
- 130th Illinois Volunteer Infantry Regiment
- 131st Illinois Volunteer Infantry Regiment
- 132nd Illinois Volunteer Infantry Regiment
- 133rd Illinois Volunteer Infantry Regiment
- 134th Illinois Volunteer Infantry Regiment
- 135th Illinois Volunteer Infantry Regiment
- 136th Illinois Volunteer Infantry Regiment
- 137th Illinois Volunteer Infantry Regiment
- 138th Illinois Volunteer Infantry Regiment
- 139th Illinois Volunteer Infantry Regiment
- 140th Illinois Volunteer Infantry Regiment
- 141st Illinois Volunteer Infantry Regiment
- 142nd Illinois Volunteer Infantry Regiment
- 143rd Illinois Volunteer Infantry Regiment
- 144th Illinois Volunteer Infantry Regiment
- 145th Illinois Volunteer Infantry Regiment
- 146th Illinois Volunteer Infantry Regiment
- 147th Illinois Volunteer Infantry Regiment
- 148th Illinois Volunteer Infantry Regiment
- 149th Illinois Volunteer Infantry Regiment
- 150th Illinois Volunteer Infantry Regiment
- 151st Illinois Volunteer Infantry Regiment
- 152nd Illinois Volunteer Infantry Regiment
- 153rd Illinois Volunteer Infantry Regiment
- 154th Illinois Volunteer Infantry Regiment
- 155th Illinois Volunteer Infantry Regiment
- 156th Illinois Volunteer Infantry Regiment
- Sturgis Rifles

== Cavalry units ==
- 1st Regiment Illinois Volunteer Cavalry
- 2nd Regiment Illinois Volunteer Cavalry
- 3rd Regiment Illinois Volunteer Cavalry
- 4th Regiment Illinois Volunteer Cavalry
- 5th Regiment Illinois Volunteer Cavalry
- 6th Regiment Illinois Volunteer Cavalry
- 7th Regiment Illinois Volunteer Cavalry
- 8th Regiment Illinois Volunteer Cavalry
- 9th Regiment Illinois Volunteer Cavalry
- 10th Regiment Illinois Volunteer Cavalry
- 11th Regiment Illinois Volunteer Cavalry
- 12th Regiment Illinois Volunteer Cavalry
- 13th Regiment Illinois Volunteer Cavalry
- 14th Regiment Illinois Volunteer Cavalry
- 15th Regiment Illinois Volunteer Cavalry
- 16th Regiment Illinois Volunteer Cavalry
- 17th Regiment Illinois Volunteer Cavalry

Named Units

- Barker's Dragoons
- Carmichael's Independent Cavalry Company
- Dollins' Independent Cavalry Company
- Ford's Independent Cavalry Company
- Gilbert's Independent Cavalry Company
- Hutchins' Independent Cavalry Company
- Jenks' Independent Cavalry Company
- Dodson's Kane County Independent Cavalry Company
- Marx's Independent Cavalry Company
- McClellan Dragoons
- McClernand's Body Guard
- Naughton's Irish Dragoons
- O'Harnett's Independent Cavalry Company
- Schambeck's Independent Cavalry Company
- Sherer's Independent Cavalry Company
- Stewart's Independent Cavalry Battalion
- Stewart's Independent Cavalry Company
- Thielman's Independent Cavalry Battalion
- Thielman's Independent Cavalry Company

== Mounted infantry units ==
- 9th Illinois Volunteer Mounted Infantry Regiment
- 92nd Illinois Volunteer Mounted Infantry Regiment
- 98th Illinois Volunteer Mounted Infantry Regiment
- 123rd Illinois Volunteer Mounted Infantry Regiment

== Artillery units ==
1st Regiment Illinois Volunteer Light Artillery

- Battery A
- Battery B
- Battery C
- Battery D
- Battery E
- Battery F
- Battery G
- Battery H
- Battery I
- Battery K
- Battery L
- Battery M

2nd Regiment Illinois Volunteer Light Artillery

- Battery A
- Battery B
- Battery C
- Battery D
- Battery E
- Battery F
- Battery G
- Battery H
- Battery I
- Battery K
- Battery L
- Battery M

Named Units

- Bridges' Battery Illinois Light Artillery
- Chicago Board of Trade Independent Battery Light Artillery
- Chicago Mercantile Independent Battery Light Artillery
- Cogswell's Battery Illinois Light Artillery
- Colvin's Battery Illinois Light Artillery
- Renwick's Elgin Battery Illinois Light Artillery
- Henshaw's Battery Illinois Light Artillery
- Springfield Illinois Light Artillery (Vaughan's)

== See also ==
- Lists of American Civil War Regiments by State
