= Battery D, 2nd Illinois Light Artillery Regiment =

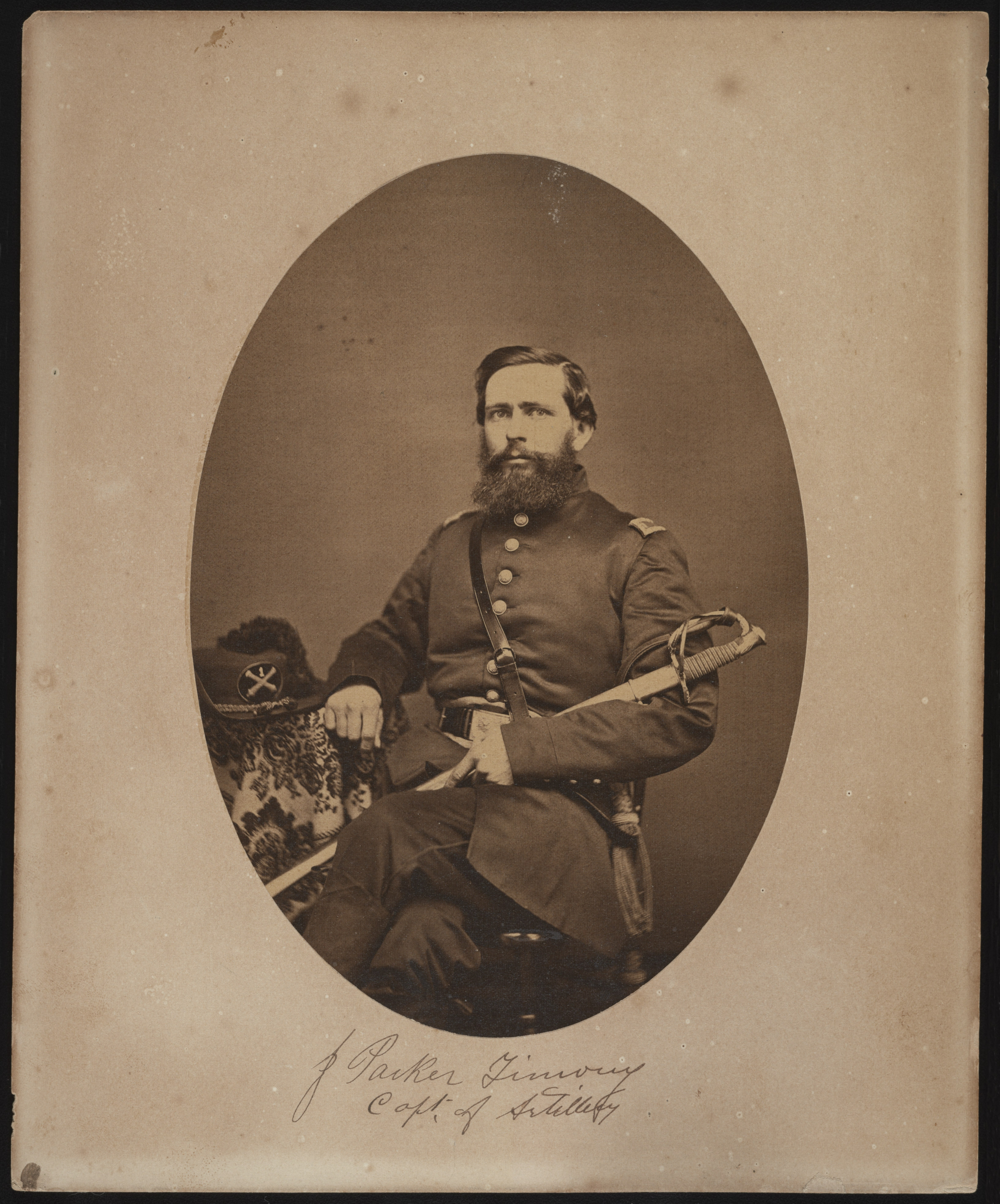
- Captain James Parker Timony of Co. D, 2nd Illinois Light Artillery Regiment. From the Liljenquist Family Collection of Civil War Photographs, Prints and Photographs Division, Library of Congress
- Active: Dec. 17, 1861 - Nov. 21, 1864
- Country: United States
- Allegiance: Union
- Branch: Artillery
- Equipment: 6 x 14-pounder James rifles
- Engagements: Battle of Fort Donelson; Battle of Shiloh; Siege of Corinth; Meridian Campaign; Battle of Decatur

Battery D, 2nd Illinois Light Artillery Regiment, was an artillery battery that served in the Union Army during the American Civil War.

== Service ==
Battery D was organized Cairo, Illinois on December 17, 1861 and mustered in for a three-year enlistment.

The battery was attached to District of Cairo to February 1862. 1st Division, District of Cairo, February 1862. 3rd Brigade, 1st Division, District of West Tennessee, to April 1862. Artillery, 1st Division, Army of the Tennessee, to July 1862. Artillery, 1st Division, District of Jackson, Tennessee, to November 1862. District of Jackson, Tennessee, XIII Corps, Department of the Tennessee, to December 1862. Artillery, 1st Division, XVI Corps, to May 1863. 2nd Brigade, District of Memphis, Tennessee, 5th Division, XVI Corps, to December 1863. 3rd Brigade, 1st Cavalry Division, XVI Corps, to January 1864. District of Memphis, Tennessee, XVI Corps, January 1864. Artillery, 4th Division, XVI Corps, to March 1864. Decatur, Alabama, District of Northern Alabama, Department of the Cumberland, to November 1864.

Battery D mustered out of service in Louisville, Kentucky on November 21, 1864. Veterans and recruits were transferred to Battery K, 2nd Illinois Light Artillery Regiment.

== Detailed service ==
Duty at Cairo, Illinois, until February 1862. Expedition from Cairo into Kentucky January 16–21, 1862. Operations against Fort Henry, Tennessee, February 2–6. Investment and capture of Fort Donelson, Tennessee, February 12–16. Moved to Savannah, then to Pittsburg Landing, Tennessee, March 5–25. Battle of Shiloh, April 6–7. Advance on and siege of Corinth, Mississippi, April 29-May 30. March to Jackson, Tennessee, June 5–8, and duty there until November. Grant's Central Mississippi Campaign November and December. Action at Davis Mills, Wolf River, Mississippi, December 21. Post duty at Grand Junction until January 1864. Expedition to Senatobia, Mississippi, May 21–26, 1863. Senatobia May 23. Moved to Memphis, Tennessee, then to Vicksburg, Mississippi, January 1864. Meridian Campaign February 3-March 2. Ordered to Decatur, Alabama, March 1864, and duty there until November 1864. Action at Pond Springs, near Courtland, May 27, and at Decatur June 1. Siege of Decatur October 26–29. Ordered to Louisville, Kentucky, November 1.

== Casualties ==
The battery lost a total of 19 enlisted men during service; 6 men killed or mortally wounded, 13 died of disease.

== Commanders ==
- Captain Jasper M. Dresser - promoted March 28, 1862
- Captain James P. Timmony - resigned April 17, 1862
- Captain Fritz Anneke - promoted December 18, 1862
- Captain Charles S. Cooper - mustered out November 1, 1864

== See also ==
- List of Illinois Civil War units
- Illinois in the Civil War
