= Battery E, 2nd Illinois Light Artillery Regiment =

- Active: August 20, 1861 – September 29, 1864
- Country: United States
- Allegiance: Union
- Branch: Artillery
- Engagements: Battle of Fort Donelson; Battle of Shiloh; Siege of Corinth; Siege of Vicksburg; Siege of Jackson

Battery E, 2nd Illinois Light Artillery Regiment, was an artillery battery that served in the Union Army during the American Civil War.

== Service ==
The battery was organized St. Louis, Missouri as Schwartz's Missouri Battery and mustered in for a three year enlistment on August 20, 1861.

The battery was attached to the District of Cairo and 1st Brigade, 1st Division, District of Cairo, to February 1862. 3rd Brigade, 1st Division, District of West Tennessee, to April 1862. Artillery, 1st Division, Army of the Tennessee, to July 1862. 1st Division, District of Jackson, Tennessee, to November 1862. 3rd Division, XIII Corps, Department of the Tennessee, to December 1863. Artillery, 4th Division, XVII Corps, to January 1863. Artillery, 4th Division, XVI Corps, to July 1863. Artillery, 3rd Division, XIII Corps, Department of the Tennessee, to August 1863, and Department of the Gulf to November 1863. Plaquemine, District of Baton Rouge, Louisiana, Department of the Gulf, to June 1864. Defenses of New Orleans, Louisiana, to September 1864.

Battery E mustered out of service on September 29, 1864.

== Detailed service ==
Duty in northern Missouri (1 section) September 6 to December 29, 1861. Battery ordered to Cairo, Illinois, September 14. Duty at Cairo, Fort Holt, and Jeffersonville, Indiana, until February 1862. Expedition to Bloomfield, Missouri, November 1, 1861. Expedition into Kentucky January 10–21, 1862. Operations against Fort Henry, Tennessee, February 2–6. Investment and capture of Fort Donelson, Tennessee, February 12–16. Moved to Savannah, then to Pittsburg Landing, Tennessee, March. Battle of Shiloh, April 6–7. Advance on and siege of Corinth, Mississippi, April 29-May 30. March to Purdy, Bethel, and Jackson June 5–8. Duty at Jackson until November. Action at Britton's Lane September 1. Grant's Central Mississippi Campaign November 1862 to January 1863. Reconnaissance from Lagrange November 8–9, 1862. March to Moscow, Tennessee, December 24, 1862 to January 12, 1863, and duty there guarding Memphis & Charleston Railroad until March 1863. Moved to Memphis, Tennessee, and duty there until May. Moved to Vicksburg, Mississippi, May 12–22. Siege of Vicksburg May 22-July 4. Advance on Jackson, Mississippi, July 5–10, Siege of Jackson July 10–17. Assault on Jackson July 12. Ordered to New Orleans, Louisiana, August 13. Duty at Carrollton, Brashear, and Berwick City until October. Western Louisiana Campaign October 3-November 30. Duty at Plaquemine, Louisiana, District of Baton Rouge, Louisiana, until June 1864, and at New Orleans, Louisiana, until September.

== Casualties ==
The battery lost a total of 17 men during service; 1 officer and 6 enlisted men killed or mortally wounded, 10 enlisted men died of disease.

== Commanders ==
- Captain Adolph Schwartz - promoted to major
- Captain George Gumbart - resigned July 15, 1863
- Captain George Lewis Nispel - resigned August 16, 1864

== See also ==
- List of Illinois Civil War units
- Illinois in the Civil War
