= 148th Regiment =

148th Regiment may refer to:

- 148th Field Artillery Regiment
- 148th Infantry Regiment (United States)
- 148th Regiment Royal Armoured Corps

== American Civil War regiments ==
- 148th Illinois Infantry Regiment
- 148th Indiana Infantry Regiment
- 148th New York Infantry Regiment
- 148th Ohio Infantry Regiment
- 148th Pennsylvania Infantry Regiment

== See also ==
- 148th Division (disambiguation)
