= 118th Illinois Infantry Regiment =

118th Regiment Illinois Volunteer Infantry
- Active: August 1862 - October 13, 1865
- Country: United States
- Allegiance: Union
- Branch: Infantry & Mounted infantry
- Engagements: Yazoo Pass Expedition; Battle of Chickasaw Bayou; Battle of Arkansas Post; Battle of Port Gibson; Battle of Champion Hill; Battle of Big Black River Bridge; Siege of Vicksburg, May 19 & May 22 assaults Red River Campaign

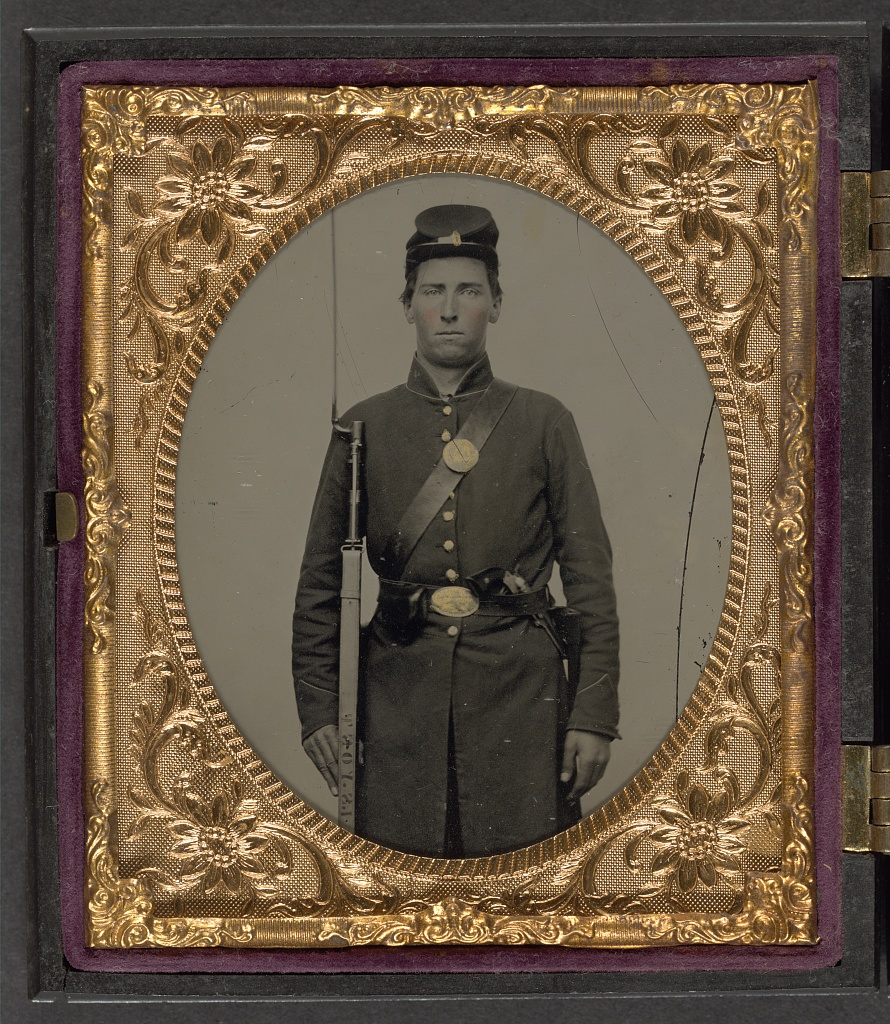
Isaac Yost of Company C, 118th Illinois Volunteer Infantry

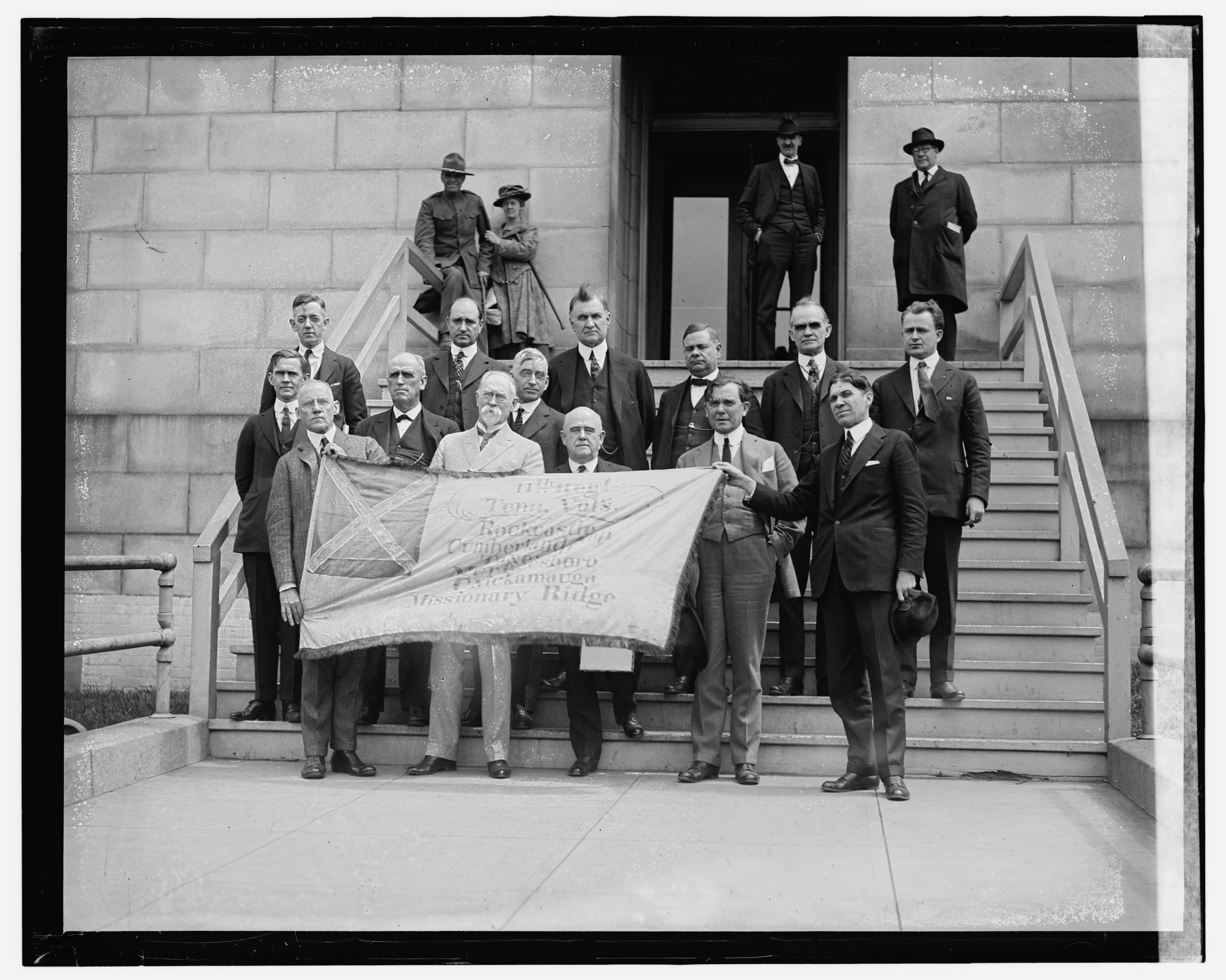
Flag captured by the 118th Illinois regiment from the 11th Tennessee

The 118th Illinois Volunteer Infantry was an infantry regiment in the Union Army during the American Civil War. On June 10, 1863, the regiment was converted to mounted infantry.

== Service ==
The 118th Illinois Infantry was organized at Camp Butler in Springfield, Illinois, August through October 1862 and mustered in for three years service on November 7, 1862, under the command of Colonel John G. Fonda.

The regiment was attached to 1st Brigade, 9th Division, Right Wing, XIII Corps, Department of the Tennessee, December 1862. 1st Brigade, 3rd Division, Sherman's Yazoo Expedition, to January 1863. 1st Brigade, 9th Division, XIII Corps, Army of the Tennessee, to July 1863. 3rd Brigade, 1st Division, XIII Corps, Army of the Tennessee, to August 1863, and Department of the Gulf to September 1863. 1st Brigade, Cavalry Division, Department of the Gulf, to November 1863. 2nd Brigade, Cavalry Division, Department of the Gulf, to July 1864. 1st Brigade, Cavalry Division, Department of the Gulf, to September 1864. 2nd Brigade, Cavalry Division, Department of the Gulf, to February 1865. Cavalry Brigade, District of Baton Rouge, Department of the Gulf, to July 1865. Department of Texas to October 1865.

The 118th Illinois Infantry mustered out of service on October 1, 1865, returned to Camp Butler, October 2–10, and was discharged October 13, 1865.

== Detailed service ==
Duty at Camp Butler and guarding prisoners until December. Left Illinois for Memphis, Tennessee, December 1, 1862. Sherman's Yazoo Expedition December 20, 1862, to January 2, 1863. Chickasaw Bayou December 26–28, 1862. Chickasaw Bluffs December 29. Yazoo River January 2, 1863. Expedition to Arkansas Post, Arkansas, January 3–10. Assault and capture of Fort Hindman January 10–11. Moved to Young's Point, Louisiana, January 17–23, and duty there until March 9. Moved to Milliken's Bend, Louisiana, March 9. Operations from Milliken's Bend to New Carthage March 31-April 17. Movement on Bruinsburg and turning Grand Gulf April 25–30. Thompson's Hill, Port Gibson, May 1. Champion Hill May 16. Big Black River May 17. Siege of Vicksburg, Mississippi, May 18-July 4. Assaults on Vicksburg May 19 and 22. At Black River Bridge May 24-July 6. Regiment mounted June 10. Edwards' Ferry July 1 (detachment). Advance on Jackson, Mississippi, July 6–10. Near Clinton July 8 (detachment). Near Jackson July 9. Siege of Jackson July 10–17. Raid to Brookhaven July 17–20. Brookhaven July 18. At Vicksburg July 25-August 8. Moved to Port Hudson August 8–9, then to Carrollton, Louisiana, August 15–16, and to Bayou Boeuf September 5–7. To Brashear City September 16. Western Louisiana Campaign October 3-November 30. Regiment mounted October 11, 1863. Vermilionville October 15. Carrion Crow Bayou October 16–20. Grand Coteau October 19. Reconnaissance toward Opelousas October 20. Barrie's Landing, Opelousas, October 21. Scouting and skirmishing about Opelousas October 22–30. Washington October 24. Bayou Bourbeaux November 2. Carrion Crow Bayou November 3. Bayou Sara November 9. Near Vermilionville November 11. At New Iberia November 15-December 18. Camp Pratt November 20. Scout to Vermilion Bayou November 22–23. Scout to St. Martinsville December 2–3. Moved to Donaldsonville December 18–23, then to Port Hudson January 3–7, and duty there until July 3, 1864. On scout January 12. Capture of Jackson, Mississippi, February 10. Skirmish February 16. Raid to Bayou Sara and skirmish February 22. Raid to Jackson March 3. Skirmishes March 26–28, April 1 and 5, May 15, June 13 and 17. Bayou Grosse Tete March 30 and April 2. Plains Store April 7. Redwood Bayou May 3. Moved to Baton Rouge July 3. Operations about Baton Rouge July 3–25. Expedition to Davidson's Ford, near Clinton, July 17–18. Olive Branch August 5. Lee's Expedition to Clinton August 23–29. Comite River and Clinton August 25. Hodge's Plantation September 11. Expedition to Amite River, New River and Bayou Manchac October 2–8. Expedition to Clinton, Greensburg, etc., October 5–9. Lee's Expedition to Brookhaven, Mississippi, November 14–21. Liberty November 18. Davidson's Expedition to West Pascagoula against Mobile & Ohio Railroad November 27-December 13. Outpost duty at Baton Rouge until May 22, 1865. Expedition west of Mississippi River February 2–3. Expedition to Olive Branch, Louisiana, March 1–10. Provost duty at Baton Rouge until October. Expedition to Clinton and Comite River March 30-April 2.

== Casualties ==
The regiment lost a total of 207 men during service; 3 officers and 21 enlisted men killed or mortally wounded, 1 officer and 182 enlisted men died of disease.

== Commanders ==
- Colonel John G. Fonda

== See also ==
- List of Illinois Civil War units
- Illinois in the Civil War
