= Battery F, 1st Illinois Light Artillery Regiment =

- Active: February 25, 1862 - February 22, 1865
- Country: United States
- Allegiance: Union
- Branch: Artillery
- Engagements: Siege of Corinth; Siege of Vicksburg; Chattanooga campaign Battle of Missionary Ridge; Atlanta campaign Battle of Resaca; Battle of Dallas; Battle of New Hope Church; Battle of Allatoona; Battle of Kennesaw Mountain; Battle of Atlanta; Siege of Atlanta; Battle of Jonesboro

Battery F, 1st Illinois Light Artillery Regiment, was an artillery battery that served in the Union Army during the American Civil War. The battery was also known as Cheney's Battery and Burton's Battery.

== Service ==
Battery F was organized at Camp Butler near Springfield, Illinois January 25, 1862 and mustered in February 25, 1862 for a three-year enlistment under the command of Captain John T. Cheney.

The battery was attached to 3rd Division, Army of the Tennessee, to July 1862. Artillery, 5th Division, District of Memphis, Tennessee, to November 1862. Artillery, 5th Division, District of Memphis, Right Wing, XIII Corps, Department of the Tennessee, November 1862. Artillery, 1st Division, XIII Corps, to December 1862. Artillery, 1st Division, XVII Corps, to January 1863. Artillery, 1st Division, XVI Corps, to July 1863. Artillery, 4th Division, XV Corps, to November 1864. Artillery Reserve, District of Nashville, Tennessee, to February 1865.

Battery F was simply discontinued by Special Field Order No. 47, Headquarters Department of the Cumberland, dated Nashville, Tennessee, February 22, 1865. Men whose term of service had not been completed were transferred to other batteries.

== Detailed service ==
Ordered to Benton Barracks, Missouri, March 15, then moved to Pittsburg Landing, Tennessee, April 1–9. Advance on and Siege of Corinth, Mississippi, April 29-May 30, 1862. March to Memphis, Tennessee, June 1–17, and duty there until November. Grant's Central Mississippi Campaign November 1862 to January 1863. Duty at Memphis and along Memphis and Charleston Railroad until June 1863. Ordered to Vicksburg, Mississippi, June 9. Siege of Vicksburg, Mississippi, June 16-July 4. Advance on Jackson, Mississippi, July 4–10. Siege of Jackson July 10–17. Camp at Big Black until September 26. Moved to Memphis, Tennessee, then to Chattanooga, Tennessee, September 28-November 21. Operations on Memphis & Charleston Railroad in Alabama October 20–29. Skirmish at Trenton, Georgia, November 18. Chattanooga-Ringgold Campaign November 23–27. Tunnel Hill November 23–24. Missionary Ridge November 25. March to relief of Knoxville, Tennessee, November 28-December 17. At Scottsboro, Alabama, until May 1864. Atlanta Campaign May to September. Demonstrations on Resaca May 9–13. Snake Creek Gap May 10–12. Battle of Resaca May 13–15. Kingston May 19–22. Advance on Dallas May 23–25. Battles about Dallas, New Hope Church, and Allatoona Hills May 25-June 5. Operations about Marietta and against Kennesaw Mountain June 10-July 2. Assault on Kennesaw June 27. Nickajack Creek July 2–5. Chattahoochie River July 6–17. Battle of Atlanta July 22. Siege of Atlanta July 22-August 25. Ezra Chapel, Hood's second sortie, July 28. Flank movement on Jonesboro August 25–30. Battle of Jonesboro August 31-September 1. Lovejoy's Station September 2–6. Operations in northern Georgia and northern Alabama against Hood, September 29-November 3. Ordered to Nashville, Tennessee, and garrison duty there until February 1865.

== Casualties ==
The battery lost a total of 32 men during service; 1 officer and 7 enlisted men killed or mortally wounded, 24 enlisted men died of disease.

== Commanders ==
- Captain John T. Cheney - promoted to major
- Captain Josiah H. Burton - promoted from lieutenant, March 16, 1864

== See also ==
- List of Illinois Civil War units
- Illinois in the Civil War
