= Battery M, 1st Illinois Light Artillery Regiment =

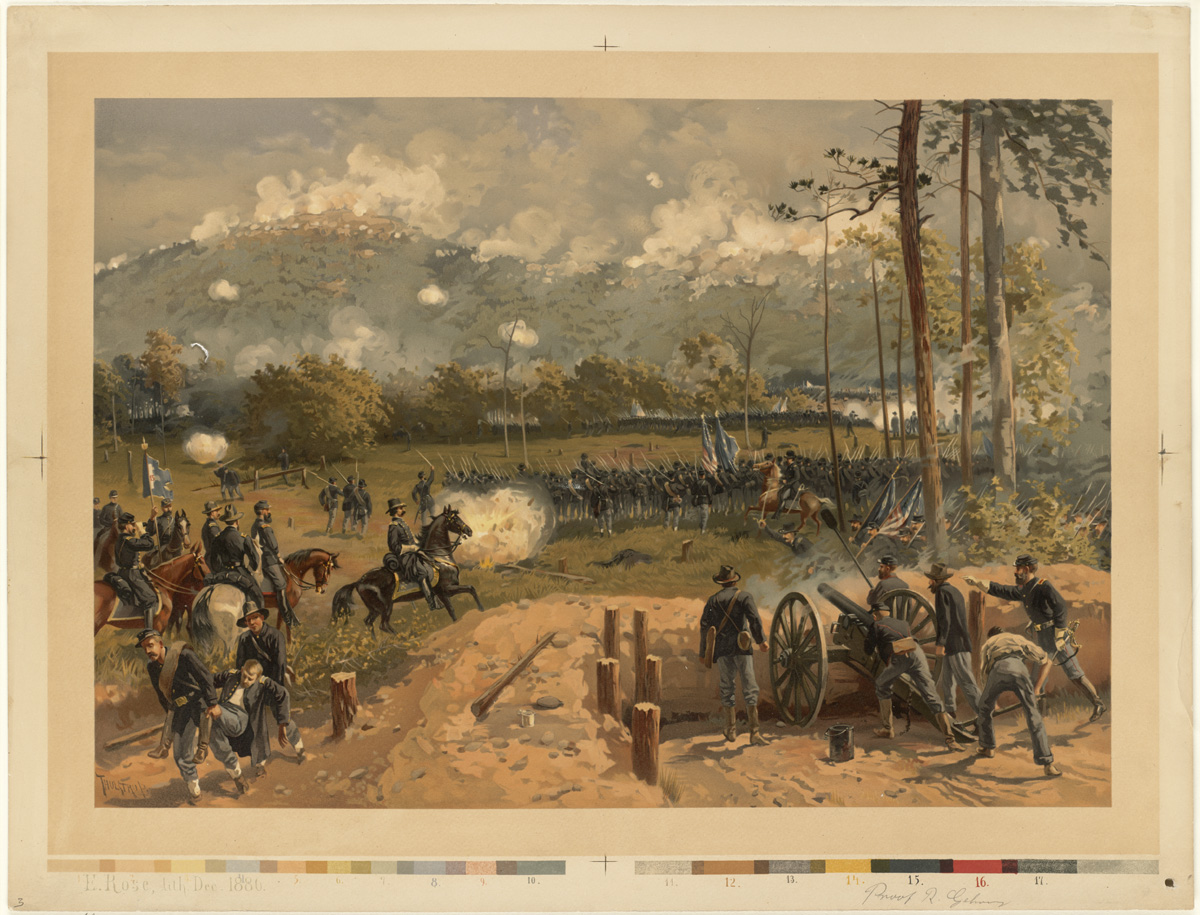
- Federal cannon at the Battle of Kennesaw Mountain
- Active: 12 Aug. 1862 – 24 July 1865
- Country: United States
- Allegiance: (United States) Union; Illinois
- Branch: Union Army
- Type: Field Artillery
- Size: Artillery Battery
- Engagements: American Civil War; Tullahoma campaign (1863); Battle of Chickamauga (1863); Battle of Missionary Ridge (1863); Knoxville campaign (1863); Atlanta campaign (1864); Battle of Rocky Face Ridge (1864); Battle of Resaca (1864); Battle of New Hope Church (1864); Battle of Kennesaw Mountain (1864); Battle of Peachtree Creek (1864); Battle of Jonesborough (1864)

Commanders
- Notable commanders: John B. Miller; George W. Spencer

Battery M, 1st Illinois Light Artillery Regiment was an artillery battery from Illinois that served in the Union Army during the American Civil War. The battery was organized in August 1862 at Chicago and was on duty in Kentucky until January 1863. The battery served in the Tullahoma campaign, at Chickamauga and Missionary Ridge, and in the Knoxville, and Atlanta campaigns. Thereafter, the unit garrisoned Chattanooga, Tennessee until it was mustered out in July 1865.

== History ==
=== Organization ===
Organized at Camp Douglass, Chicago, Ill., and mustered on August 12, 1862. Moved to Louisville, Ky., September 27, 1862. Attached to District of Louisville, Ky., Dept. of Ohio, to October, 1862. 34th Brigade, 10th Division, Army Ohio, to November, 1862. 34th Brigade, 10th Division, District of West Kentucky, Dept. Ohio, to February, 1863. Reed's Brigade, Baird's Division, Army of Kentucky, Dept. of the Cumberland, to June, 1863. 1st Division, Reserve Corps, Army of the Cumberland, to October, 1863. Artillery, 2nd Division, 4th Army Corps, Army of the Cumberland, to July, 1864. Artillery Brigade, 4th Army Corps, to October, 1864. Unattached Artillery, Dept. of the Cumberland, to November, 1864. Garrison Artillery, Chattanooga, Tenn., to April, 1865. Garrison Artillery, Cleveland, Tenn., Dept. of the Cumberland, to July, 1865.

=== Service ===
At Louisville, Ky., until October 11, 1862. Moved to Lebanon, Ky., October 11, thence to Columbia November 26, and to Lebanon, Ky., December 29. Operations against Morgan in Kentucky December 29, 1862 – January 2, 1863. Moved to New Haven January 6, 1863, thence to Louisville, Ky., January 22, and to Nashville, Tenn., January 29-February 7. Moved to Franklin February 12, and duty there until June. Tullahoma Campaign June 23-July 7. At Shelbyville June 29-September 6. Chickamauga (Ga.) Campaign September 6–22. Battle of Chickamauga September 19–21. Rossville Gap September 21. Siege of Chattanooga, Tenn., September 24-November 23. Battles of Chattanooga November 23–25. Orchard Knob, Indian Hill, November 23–24. Mission Ridge November 25. March to relief of Knoxville November 28-December 17. Operations in East Tennessee December, 1863, to April, 1864. Moved to Cleveland, Tenn., April 18, 1864. Atlanta (Ga.) Campaign May to September. Demonstration on Rocky Faced Ridge May 8–11. Buzzard's Roost Gap, or Mill Creek, May 8–9. Battle of Resaca May 14–15. Adairsville May 17. Near Kingston May 18–19. Near Cassville May 19. Advance on Dallas May 22–25. Operations on line of Pumpkin Vine Creek and Battles about Dallas, New Hope Church and Allatoona Hills May 25-June 5. Operations about Marietta and against Kenesaw Mountain June 10-July 2. Pine Hill June 11–14. Lost Mountain June 15–17. Assault on Kenesaw June 27. Ruff's Station July 4. Chattahoochie River July 6–17. Buckhead, Nancy's Creek, July 18. Peach Tree Creek July 19–20. Siege of Atlanta July 22-August 25. Flank movement on Jonesboro August 25–30. Battle of Jonesboro August 31-September 1. Lovejoy Station September 2–6. Duty at Atlanta until November 1. Ordered to Chattanooga November 1. Garrison duty at Chattanooga, Cleveland and Charleston, Tenn., until July, 1865. Moved to Chicago, Ill., July 14 and mustered out July 24, 1865.

Battery lost 4 Enlisted men killed and mortally wounded and 1 Officer and 10 Enlisted men by disease, Total 15.

== See also ==
- List of Illinois Civil War units
