= Battery A, 2nd Illinois Light Artillery Regiment =

- Active: May 23, 1861 – July 28, 1865
- Country: United States
- Allegiance: Union
- Branch: Artillery
- Engagements: Battle of Pea Ridge; Battle of Prairie Grove (1st Section); Battle of Port Gibson; Battle of Champion Hill; Battle of Big Black River Bridge; Siege of Vicksburg, May 19 & May 22 assaults Bayou Teche Campaign; Siege of Fort Gaines; Siege of Fort Morgan

Battery A, 2nd Illinois Light Artillery Regiment, was an artillery battery that served in the Union Army during the American Civil War. The battery was alternately known as Davidson's Battery, Borris' Battery, and Peoria Light Artillery.

== Service ==
Battery A was organized Peoria, Illinois and mustered in May 23, 1861 for state service under the command of Captain Peter Davidson. The battery was subsequently mustered into federal service for a three years service on August 17, 1861 at Jefferson Barracks in St. Louis, Missouri.

The battery was attached to Fremont's Army of the West and to Department of the Missouri to February 1862. 2nd Brigade, 3rd Division, Army of Southwest Missouri, to May 1862. Artillery, 3rd Division, Army of Southwest Missouri, to July 1862. District of Eastern Arkansas, Department of the Missouri, to December 1862, and Department of the Tennessee to January 1863. Artillery, 12th Division, XIII Corps, Army of the Tennessee, to May 1863. Artillery, 14th Division, XIII Corps, Army of the Tennessee, to July 1863. 3rd Brigade, 1st Division, XIII Corps, Department of the Tennessee, to August 1863, and Department of the Gulf to September 1863. Artillery, 1st Division, XIII Corps, Department of the Gulf, to June 1864. Defenses of New Orleans, Louisiana, Department of the Gulf, to April 1865. District of LaFourche, Department of the Gulf, to July 1865.

Battery A, 2nd Illinois Light Artillery mustered out of service July 28, 1865.

== Detailed service ==
Moved to Alton, Illinois, July 6, then to St. Charles and Mexico, Missouri, and duty in northern Missouri until August. Ordered to Jefferson Barracks, Missouri. Moved to Jefferson City, Missouri, then to Boonville, Missouri, October 1. Fremont's Campaign against Springfield, Missouri, October 21 – November 8, 1861. At Ottersville, Missouri, until January 1862. Moved to Lebanon, Missouri, January 25. Curtis' advance on Springfield, Missouri, January 25 – February 11. Pursuit of Price into Arkansas February 14–29. Battle of Pea Ridge, March 6–8. March to Sugar Creek March 10, then to Cross Timbers March 15, and over Ozark Mountains to Batesville April 5 – May 3. March to Helena, Arkansas, May 25 – July 13. Duty at Helena until March 1863. Ordered to Milliken's Bend, Louisiana, March 20, and duty there until April. Movement on Bruinsburg and turning Grand Gulf April 25–30. Battle of Thompson's Hill, Port Gibson, Mississippi, May 1. Battle of Champion Hill May 16. Big Black River May 17. Siege of Vicksburg, Mississippi, May 18 – July 4. Assaults on Vicksburg May 19 and 22. Advance on Jackson, Mississippi, July 5–10. Siege of Jackson July 10–17. At Big Black until August. Ordered to New Orleans, Louisiana, August 20. At Carrollton, Brashear City, and Berwick until October. Western Louisiana Campaign October 3 – November 30. Duty in District of LaFourche and defenses of New Orleans, Louisiana, until August 1864. Operations in Mobile Bay against Forts Gaines and Morgan August 2–23. Siege and capture of Fort Gaines August 3–8. Siege and capture of Fort Morgan August 8–23. Duty in the defenses of New Orleans and District of LaFourche till July 1865.

The 1st Section was detached in District of Southwest Missouri to October 1862. Attached to 1st Brigade, 2nd Division, Army of the Frontier, to June 1863. District of Southeast Missouri. Advance on Fayetteville, Arkansas, October 11 – December 3, 1862. Marched to relief of Gen. Blount December 3–6. Battle of Prairie Grove, December 7. At Fayetteville until December 27. Expedition over Boston Mountains to Van Buren, Arkansas, December 27–29. Duty at various points in Missouri until April 1863. Operations against Marmaduke April 20 – May 2. Moved to Pilot Knob, Missouri. Duty in District of Southeast Missouri until July 1863.

== Casualties ==
The battery lost a total of 22 men during service; 5 enlisted men killed or mortally wounded, 1 officer and 16 enlisted men died of disease.

== Commanders ==
- Captain Peter Davidson
- Captain Fletcher H. Chapman
- Captain Herman Borris – dismissed from the service, March 1, 1865
- Captain William W. Campbell
- Lieutenant Frank B. Fenton – commanded at the battle of Champion Hill

== See also ==
- List of Illinois Civil War units
- Illinois in the Civil War
