= 8th Ohio Independent Light Artillery Battery =

8th Ohio Battery
- Active: March 11, 1862, to August 7, 1865
- Country: United States
- Allegiance: Union
- Branch: Artillery
- Equipment: 6 30-pdr Parrotts
- Engagements: Battle of Shiloh; Siege of Corinth; Yazoo Pass Expedition; Battle of Chickasaw Bayou; Battle of Arkansas Post; Siege of Vicksburg, May 19 & May 22 assaults Siege of Jackson

8th Ohio Battery was an artillery battery that served in the Union Army during the American Civil War.

== Service ==
The 8th Ohio Battery was organized at Camp Dennison near Cincinnati, Ohio and mustered in for a three-year enlistment on March 11, 1862, under Captain Louis Markgraf.

The battery was unattached, Army of the Tennessee, to April 1862. Artillery, 5th Division, Army of the Tennessee, to April 1862. Artillery, 3rd Division, Army of the Tennessee, to July 1862. Artillery, 5th Division, District of Memphis, Tennessee, to November 1862. Artillery, 2nd Division, District of Memphis, Right Wing, XIII Corps, Department of the Tennessee, to December 1862. Artillery, 2nd Division, Sherman's Yazoo Expedition, to January 1863. Artillery, 2nd Division, XV Corps, Army of the Tennessee, to September 1863. Artillery, 1st Division, XVII Corps, to April 1864. Maltby's Brigade, District of Vicksburg, to November 1864. Artillery Reserve, District of Vicksburg, to August 1865.

The 8th Ohio Battery mustered out of service at Camp Dennison on August 7, 1865.

== Detailed service ==
Moved to Benton Barracks, Mo.; then to Savannah, Tenn., March 22–28, 1862. Battle of Shiloh, April 6–7, 1862. Advance on and siege of Corinth, Miss., April 29-May 30. March to Memphis, Tenn., June 1–17, and duty there until November, 1862. Grant's Central Mississippi Campaign November–December. "Tallahatchie March" November 26-December 12. Sherman's Yazoo Expedition December 20, 1862, to January 3, 1863. Chickasaw Bayou December 26–28. Chickasaw Bluff December 29. Expedition to Arkansas Post, Ark., January 3–10, 1863. Assault on and capture of Fort Hindman, Arkansas Post, January 10–11. Moved to Young's Point, La., January 17, and duty there until March. Expedition to Rolling Fork via Muddy, Steele's and Black Bayous, and Deer Creek March 14–27. Moved to Milliken's Bend and duty there until April. Demonstrations on Haines and Drumgould's Bluffs April 29-May 2. Moved to join army in rear of Vicksburg via Richmond and Grand Gulf May 2–14. Jackson, Miss., May 14. Siege of Vicksburg May 18-July 4. Assaults on Vicksburg May 19 and 22. Advance Jackson, Miss., May 5–10. Siege of Jackson July 10–17. Duty at Vicksburg until February 1864. Expedition from Vicksburg to Sunnyside Landing. Ark.. January 10–16, 1864. Duty in the defenses of Vicksburg until May 20, 1865. Expedition to Central Mississippi Railroad November 28-December 2, 1864. Moved to Natchez, Miss., May 20, 1865, and duty there until June 28. At Vicksburg until July 20.

== Casualties ==
The battery lost a total of 23 men during service; 1 enlisted men killed, 22 enlisted men died of disease.

== Commanders ==
- Captain Louis Markgraf
- Captain James F. Putnam

== See also ==
- List of Ohio Civil War units
- Ohio in the Civil War
