= Battery H, 1st Illinois Light Artillery Regiment =

- Active: January 1862 – June 14, 1865
- Country: United States
- Allegiance: Union
- Branch: Artillery
- Equipment: 4 x 20-pounder Parrott rifles (May 1864)
- Engagements: Battle of Shiloh; Siege of Corinth; Battle of Chickasaw Bayou; Battle of Champion Hill; Siege of Vicksburg (May 19 & 22 assaults); Siege of Jackson; Battle of Missionary Ridge; Atlanta campaign Battle of Resaca; Battle of Dallas; Battle of New Hope Church; Battle of Allatoona; Battle of Kennesaw Mountain; Battle of Atlanta; Siege of Atlanta; Battle of Jonesborough; Battle of Lovejoy's Station; Sherman's March to the Sea; Carolinas campaign Battle of Bentonville

Battery H, 1st Illinois Light Artillery Regiment, was an artillery battery that served in the Union Army during the American Civil War.

== Service ==
The battery was organized in Chicago, Illinois beginning in January 1862 and mustered on February 20, 1862, for a three-year enlistment under the command of Captain Axel Silversparre.

The battery first served unassigned with the Army of the Tennessee, April 1862. It was subsequently attached to Artillery, 5th Division, Army of the Tennessee, to July 1862. Artillery, 5th Division, District of Memphis, Tennessee, to November 1862. Artillery, 5th Division, Right Wing, XIII Corps, Department of the Tennessee, November 1862. Artillery, 1st Division, District of Memphis, XIII Corps, to January 1863. Artillery, 2nd Division, XV Corps, Army of the Tennessee, to September 1864. Artillery Brigade, XV Corps, to June 1865.

Battery H mustered out of service June 14, 1865, in Louisville, Kentucky.

== Detailed service ==
Moved to St. Louis, Missouri, then moved to Pittsburg Landing, Tennessee, April 1–4. Battle of Shiloh, April 6–7, 1862. Advance on and siege of Corinth, Mississippi, April 29 – May 30. Russell's House May 17. Occupation of Corinth May 30. March to Memphis June 3 to July 21, and duty there until November. Grant's Central Mississippi Campaign November 1862 to January 1863. "Tallahatchie March" November 26 – December 13. Moved to Young's Point, Louisiana, January 1863 and duty there until March. Expedition to Rolling Fork, via Muddy, Steele's and Black Bayous, and Deer Creek, March 14–27. Demonstration on Haines' and Drumgould's Bluffs April 29 – May 2. Movement to join the army in the rear of Vicksburg, Mississippi, via Richmond and Grand Gulf, May 2–14. Battle of Champion Hill May 16. Siege of Vicksburg May 18 – July 4. Assaults on Vicksburg May 19 and 22. Advance on Jackson, Mississippi, July 4–10. Siege of Jackson July 10–17. At Big Black River until September 25. Moved to Memphis, Tennessee, then to Chattanooga, Tennessee, September 25 – November 21. Operations on Memphis & Charleston Railroad in Alabama, October 20–29. Bear Creek, Tuscumbia, October 27. Chattanooga-Ringgold Campaign November 23–27. Tunnel Hill November 24–25. Missionary Ridge November 25. Pursuit November 26–27. March to relief of Knoxville, Tennessee, November 28 – December 13. March to Chattanooga December 13–17, then to Bridgeport, Alabama. Duty at Bridgeport, Bellefonte, and Larkinsville, Alabama, to May 1864. Atlanta Campaign May to September. Demonstrations on Resaca May 8–13. Battle of Resaca May 13–15. Advance on Dallas May 18–25. Battles about Dallas, New Hope Church, and Allatoona Hills May 25 – June 5. Operations about Marietta and against Kennesaw Mountain June 10 – July 2. Assault on Kennesaw June 27. Nickajack Creek July 2–5. Chattahoochie River July 6–17. Battle of Atlanta July 22. Siege of Atlanta July 22 – August 25. Ezra Chapel July 28. Flank movement on Jonesborough August 25–30. Battle of Jonesborough August 31 – September 1. Lovejoy's Station September 2–6. Operations against Hood in northern Georgia and northern Alabama September 29 – November 3. March to the sea November 15 – December 10. Siege of Savannah December 10–21. Carolinas Campaign January to April 1865. Duck Branch, near Loper's Crossing, South Carolina, February 2. Salkehatchie Swamp February 3–6. Dillingham's Cross Roads, or Duck Branch, February 3. South Edisto River February 9. North Edisto River February 12–13. Congaree Creek February 15. Columbia February 16–17. Wateree Creek February 22. Battle of Bentonville, North Carolina, March 20–21. Occupation of Goldsboro March 24. Advance on Raleigh April 10–14. Occupation of Raleigh April 14. Bennett's House April 26. Surrender of Johnston and his army. Marched to Washington, D.C., via Richmond, Virginia, April 29 – May 20. Grand Review of the Armies May 24. Moved to Louisville, Kentucky, June.

== Armament ==
During the Battle of Atlanta on 22 July 1864, Battery H, 1st Illinois Artillery (DeGress's) was overrun by a Confederate attack which took its four 20-pounder Parrott rifles. However, a Union counterattack recaptured the guns.

== Casualties ==
The battery lost a total of 34 men during service; 1 officer and 6 enlisted men killed or mortally wounded, 27 enlisted men died of disease.

== Commanders ==
- Captain Axel Silversparre – promoted to chief of artillery at Fort Pickering; captured and never returned to the battery
- Captain Levi W. Hart
- Captain Francis DeGress

== See also ==
- List of Illinois Civil War units
- Illinois in the Civil War
