= Battery G, 2nd Illinois Light Artillery Regiment =

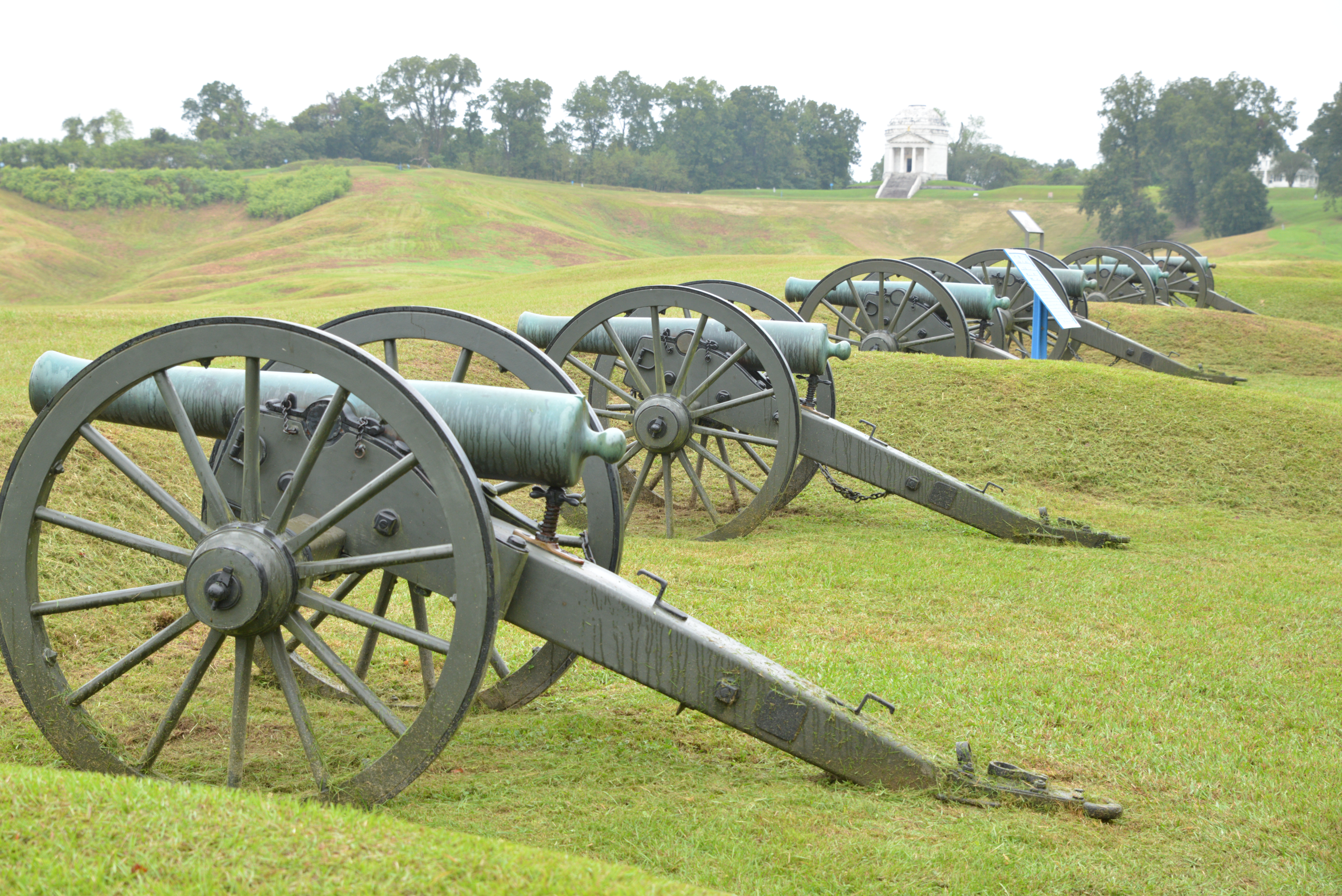
- 12-pounder Napoleon gun-howitzers near the Illinois memorial at Vicksburg National Military Park
- Active: 31 Dec. 1861 – 4 Sept. 1865
- Country: United States
- Allegiance: (United States) Union; Illinois
- Branch: Union Army
- Type: Field Artillery
- Size: Artillery Battery
- Engagements: American Civil War; Siege of Vicksburg (1863); Battle of Tupelo (1864); Battle of Nashville (1864); Battle of Spanish Fort (1865); Battle of Fort Blakeley (1865)

Commanders
- Notable commanders: Charles J. Strolbrand; Frederick Sparrestrom; John W. Lowell

Battery G, 2nd Illinois Light Artillery Regiment was an artillery battery from Illinois that served in the Union Army during the American Civil War. The battery was organized at the end of December 1861. It fought at Vicksburg in 1863, Tupelo and Nashville in 1864, and Spanish Fort and Fort Blakeley in 1865. The battery was mustered out in September 1865.

== History ==
=== Organization ===
Organized at Camp Butler, Ill., and mustered on December 31, 1861. Attached to Fort Holt, Ky., Dept. of Missouri, to March, 1862. District of Columbus, Ky., to November, 1862. District of Jackson, 13th Army Corps (Old), Dept. of the Tennessee, to December, 1862. Artillery, 3rd Division, 17th Army Corps, Army of the Tennessee, to December, 1863. District of Columbus, Ky., 6th Division, 16th Army Corps, to June, 1864. Artillery, 3rd Division, 16th Army Corps, to December, 1864. 3rd Brigade, 2nd Division, Detachment Army of the Tennessee, Dept. of the Cumberland, to February, 1865. Artillery, 2nd Division, 16th Army Corps (New), Military Division of West Mississippi, to March, 1865. Artillery Brigade, 16th Army Corps, and Dept. of Alabama, to September, 1865.

=== Service ===
Duty at Fort Holt, Ky., until March, 1862, and in the District of Columbus, Ky., and in District of Jackson, Tenn., until November, 1862. Grant's Central Mississippi Campaign October 31, 1862, to January 10, 1863. About Oxford, Miss., December 1–3, 1862. Water Valley Station December 4. Coffeeville December 5. Moved to Memphis, Tenn., January, 1863, thence to Lake Providence, La., February 22, and to Milliken's Bend April 17, Movement on Bruinsburg and turning Grand Gulf April 25–30. While crossing river to Bruinsburg May 1 on Transport "Horizon" the boat was sunk in collision with Transport "Moderator" and guns and equipment lost. Battery sent to Memphis, Tenn., for reequipment and rejoined for duty June 30, 1863. Siege of Vicksburg June 30-July 4. Surrender of Vicksburg July 4. Duty at Vicksburg until November. At Grand Junction, Tenn., until January, 1864, and in District of Columbus, Ky., until June, 1864. Operations in West Tennessee and Kentucky against Forest March 16-April 14. Smith's Expedition to Tupelo, Miss., July 5–21. Harrisburg, near Tupelo, July 14–15. Old Town, or Tishamingo Creek, July 15. Ellistown July 16. Smith's Expedition to Oxford, Miss., August 1–30. Moved to St. Louis, Mo., September. March through Missouri in pursuit of Price September to November. Moved to Nashville, Tenn., November 25-December 1. Battle of Nashville, Tenn., December 15–16. Pursuit of Hood December 17–28. Moved to Eastport, Miss., and duty there until February 6. Moved to New Orleans, La., February 6–22. Campaign against Mobile and its defences March 17-April 12. Siege of Spanish Fort and Fort Blakely March 26-April 8. Assault and capture of Fort Blakely April 9. Occupation of Mobile April 12, March to Montgomery April 13–25. Duty there and at various other points in District of Alabama until September. Mustered out September 4, 1865.

Battery lost during service 2 Enlisted men killed and mortally wounded and 25 Enlisted men by disease. Total 27.

== See also ==
- List of Illinois Civil War units
