= Battery I, 2nd Illinois Light Artillery Regiment =

- Active: December 31, 1861 – June 14, 1865
- Country: United States
- Allegiance: Union
- Branch: Artillery
- Equipment: 2 x M1857 12-pounder Napoleons; 2 x 14-pounder James rifles 2 x 10-pounder Parrott rifles
- Engagements: Battle of Island No. 10; Siege of Corinth; Battle of Perryville; Tullahoma Campaign; Battle of Chickamauga; Siege of Chattanooga; Battle of Lookout Mountain; Battle of Missionary Ridge; Atlanta campaign Battle of Resaca; Battle of Kennesaw Mountain; Siege of Atlanta; Battle of Jonesboro; Sherman's March to the Sea; Carolinas campaign Battle of Bentonville

Battery I, 2nd Illinois Light Artillery Regiment was an artillery battery that served in the Union Army during the American Civil War.

== Service ==
The battery was organized at Camp Butler near Springfield, Illinois and mustered in for a three-year enlistment on December 31, 1861 under the command of Captain Charles W. Keith.

The battery was attached to District of Cairo to February 1862. Flotilla Brigade, Army of the Mississippi, to April 1862. Artillery Division, Army of the Mississippi, to September 1862. Artillery, 11th Division, Army of the Ohio, to October 1862. Artillery, 11th Division, III Corps, Army of the Ohio, to November 1862. Artillery, 4th Division, Center, XIV Corps, Army of the Cumberland, to January 1863. Artillery, 4th Division, XIV Corps, to June 1863. Artillery, 2nd Division, Reserve Corps, Department of the Cumberland, to October 1863. Artillery, 2nd Division, XIV Corps, to January 1864. Artillery, 1st Division, XI Corps, Army of the Cumberland, to April 1864. Artillery, 2nd Division, XIV Corps, to July 1864. Artillery Brigade, XIV Corps, to June 1865.

Battery I, 2nd Illinois Light Artillery Regiment mustered out of service on June 14, 1865.

== Detailed service ==
Duty at Cairo, Illinois, until February 1862. Operations against New Madrid February 28-March 14 and against Island No. 10 March 15-April 8. Action at Island No. 10 March 15–16. Action and capture at Tiptonville April 8. Expedition to Fort Pillow, Tennessee, April 13–17. Moved to Hamburg Landing, Tennessee, April 18–22. Advance on and siege of Corinth, Mississippi, April 29-May 30. Pursuit to Booneville May 31-June 12. Booneville June 3–4. At Big Springs June 14 to July 22. Moved to Iuka, Mississippi, then to Courtland, Alabama, and duty along Memphis & Charleston Railroad until September. March to Nashville, Tennessee, September 3–12. Siege of Nashville September 12-November 7. Repulse of Forest's attack November 5. Duty at Nashville and Brentwood until June 1863. Reconnaissance to Mill Creek November 27, 1862. Escort trains to Stones River January 2–3, 1863. Stones River January 3–5. Tullahoma Campaign June 23-July 7. Occupation of middle Tennessee until August 16. Passage of Cumberland Mountains and Tennessee River, and Chickamauga Campaign August 16-September 22. Battle of Chickamauga September 19–20. Rossville Gap September 21. Siege of Chattanooga, Tennessee, September 24-November 23. Battles of Chattanooga November 23–25. Missionary Ridge November 24–25. March to relief of Knoxville November 27-December 8. At Nashville and in Wauhatchie Valley, Tennessee, until April 1864. Atlanta Campaign May 1-September 8, 1864. Tunnel Hill May 6–7. Rocky Faced Ridge May 8–11. Buzzard's Roost Gap, or Mill Creek, May 8–9. Battle of Resaca May 14–15. Rome May 17–18. Operations on Pumpkin Vine Creek and battles about Dallas, New Hope Church, and Allatoona Hills May 25-June 5. Operations about Marietta and against Kennesaw Mountain June 10-July 2. Pine Hill June 11–14. Lost Mountain June 15–17. Assault on Kennesaw June 27. Ruff's Station July 4. Chattahoochie River July 5–17. Peachtree Creek July 19–20. Siege of Atlanta July 22-August 25. Utoy Creek August 5–7. Flank movement on Jonesboro August 25–30. Battle of Jonesboro August 31-September 1. Operations against Hood in northern Georgia and northern Alabama September 29-November 3. March to the Sea November 15-December 10. Siege of Savannah December 10–21. Campaign of the Carolinas January to April 1865. Averysboro, North Carolina, March 16. Battle of Bentonville March 19–21. Occupation of Goldsboro March 24. Advance on Raleigh April 10–14. Occupation of Raleigh April 14. Bennett's House April 26. Surrender of Johnston and his army. March to Washington, D.C., via Richmond, Virginia, April 29-May 20. Grand Review of the Armies May 24.

== Casualties ==
The battery lost a total of 15 men during service; 1 officer and 4 enlisted men killed or mortally wounded, 10 enlisted men died of disease.

== Commanders ==
- Captain Charles W. Keith - resigned April 7, 1862
- Captain Charles M. Barnett
- Lieutenant Henry B. Plant - commanded during the Chattanooga Campaign

== See also ==
- List of Illinois Civil War units
- Illinois in the Civil War
