= Battery H, 2nd Illinois Light Artillery Regiment =

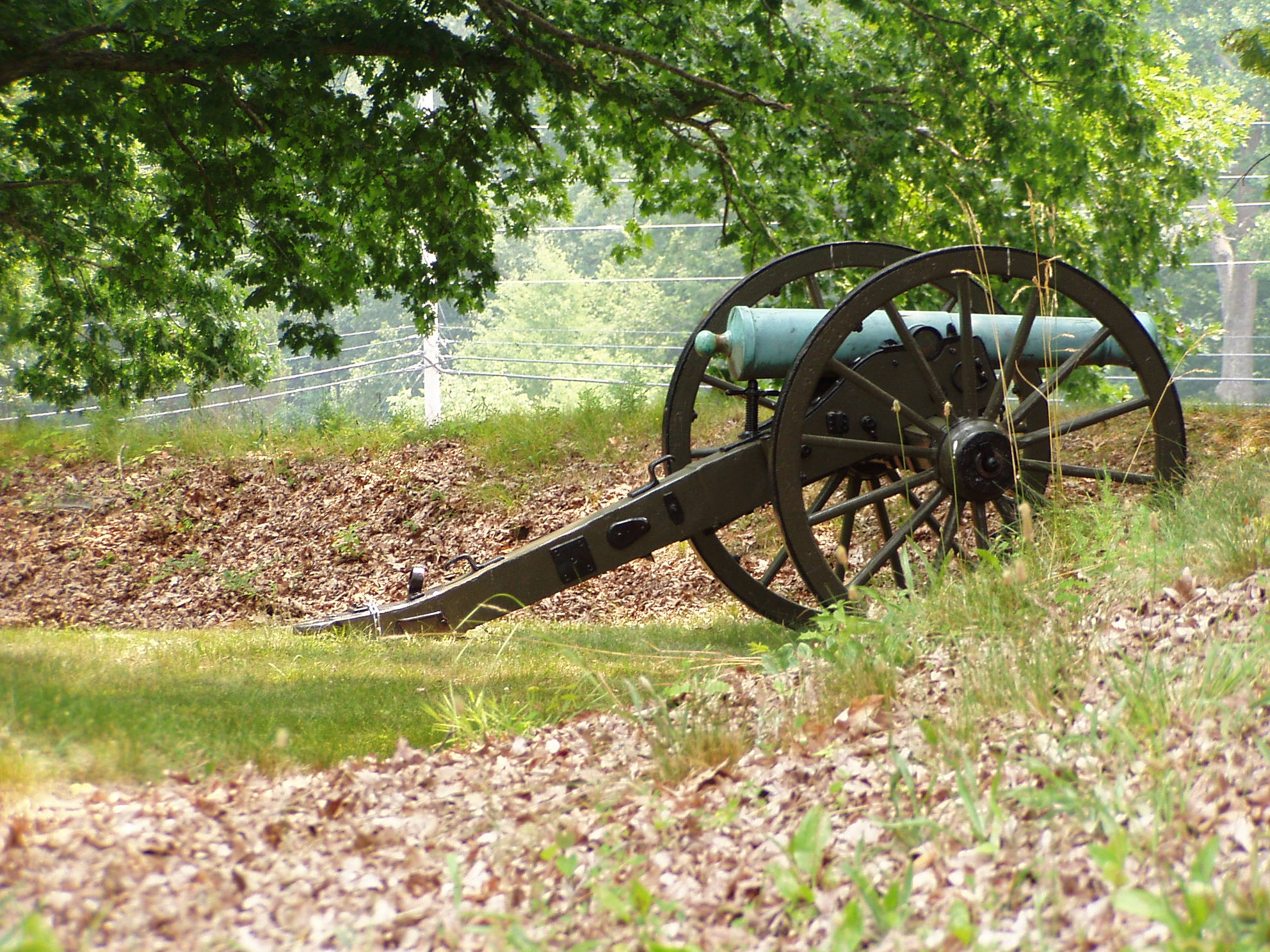
- M1841 6-pounder field gun is found at Fort Donelson National Battlefield. Battery H served most of the war in garrison at or near Fort Donelson.
- Active: 31 Dec. 1861 – 29 July 1865
- Country: United States
- Allegiance: (United States) Union; Illinois
- Branch: Union Army
- Type: Field Artillery
- Size: Artillery Battery
- Engagements: American Civil War; Battle of Riggins Hill (1862)

Commanders
- Notable commanders: Andrew Stenbeck; Henry C. Whittemore

Battery H, 2nd Illinois Light Artillery Regiment was an artillery battery from Illinois that served in the Union Army during the American Civil War. The battery was organized in December 1861 at Springfield, Illinois before traveling to Cairo and to western Kentucky in early 1862. The battery formed the garrison of Fort Donelson and Clarksville, Tennessee from March 1863 until the end of the war. The soldiers were mustered out of Federal service in July 1865.

== History ==
=== Organization ===
Organized at Camp Butler, Ill., and mustered on December 31, 1861. Moved to Cairo, Ill., February 6, 1862. Attached to District of Cairo to March, 1862. District of Columbus, Ky., to November, 1862. District of Columbus, Ky., 13th Army Corps (Old), Dept. of the Tennessee, to January, 1863. District of Columbus, Ky., 16th Army Corps, to June, 1863. 3rd Division, Reserve Corps, Army of the Cumberland, to October, 1863. Posts of Fort Donelson and Clarksville, Tenn., Dept. of the Cumberland, to March, 1865. 5th Sub-District, District of Middle Tennessee., Dept. of the Cumberland, to July, 1865.

=== Service ===
Duty at Cairo, Ill., until March, 1862, and at Columbus, Ky., until August. Expedition to Fort Pillow, Tenn., April 13–17 (1 Section). Expedition to Henderson, Ky., in pursuit of Morgan August 18. (1 Section moved to Smithland, Ky., August 18, and 1 Section to Fort Heiman September 4, 1862.) Expedition from Fort Donelson, Tenn., to Clarksville, Tenn., September 5–20. Riggins' Hill, Clarksville, September 7. At Clarksville, Tenn., until March, 1863. Moved to Fort Donelson, Tenn., March 8. Action at Parker's Cross Road March 8. Duty at Fort Donelson, Tenn., until August. Moved to Clarksville, Tenn., August 26, and duty there as garrison and on mounted scouting between Cumberland and Tennessee Rivers and on Edgefield & Kentucky R. R. until July, 1865. Reenlisted January 1, 1864, and Veterans on furlough March 5 to April 9, 1864. Action at Canton and Rockcastle Fords August 8, 1864. Mustered out July 29, 1865.

Battery lost during service 2 Enlisted men killed and 23 Enlisted men by disease. Total 25.

== See also ==
- List of Illinois Civil War units
