= Pittsburg Landing, Tennessee =

River landing in Tennessee, USA

Coordinates: 35°09′08″N 88°19′22″W

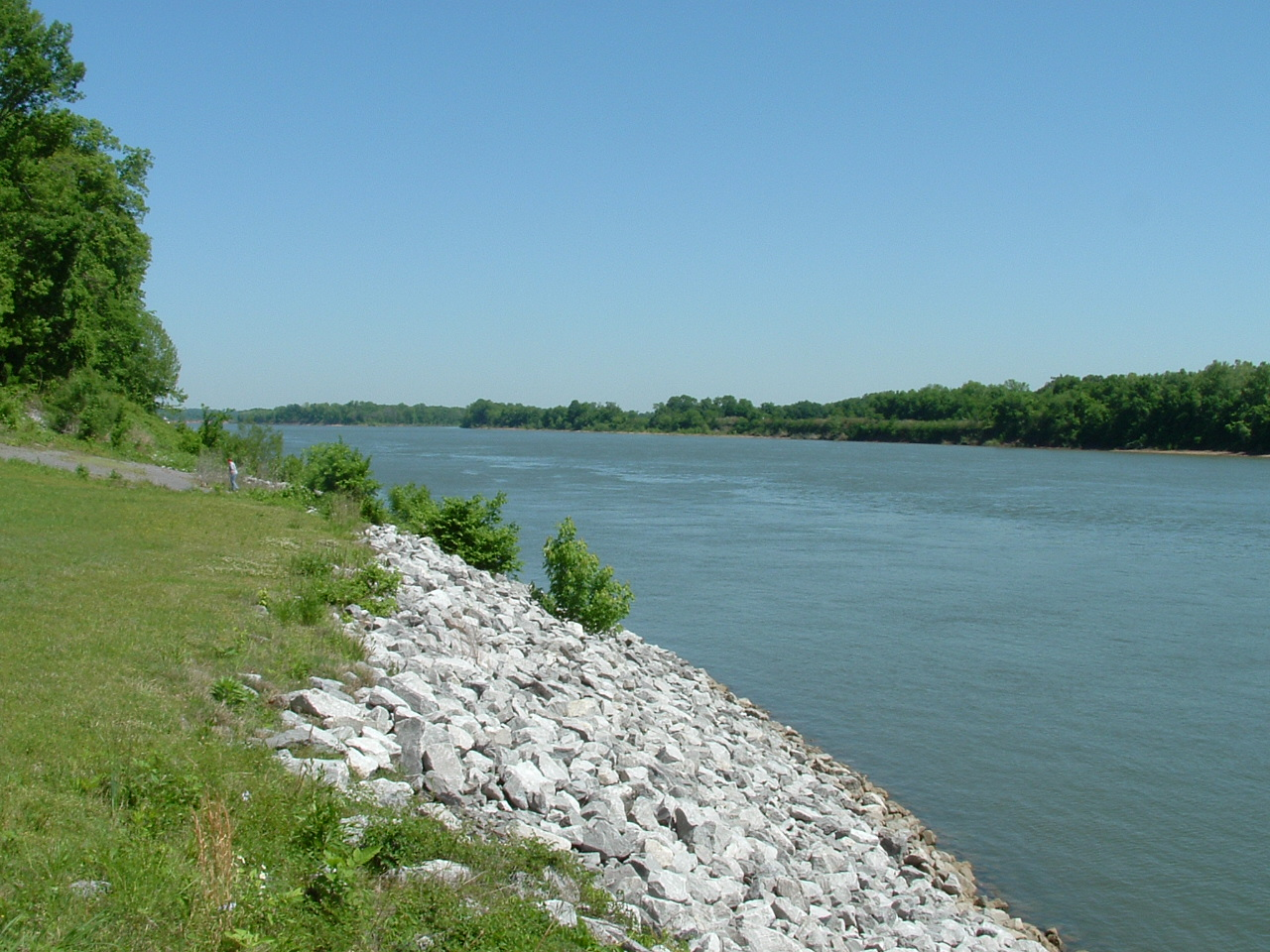
Pittsburg Landing, Shiloh National Military Park

Pittsburg Landing is a river landing on the west bank of the Tennessee River in Hardin County, Tennessee. It was named for "Pitts" Tucker who operated a tavern at the site in the years preceding the Civil War. The landing helped connect the west side of the river to a road on the east that went back to Savannah. The landing was home to many families of settlers that migrated from about 1840 to 1860. It is located at latitude 35.15222 and longitude -88.32278 with an elevation of 482 feet (147 m). The aforementioned tavern was on the site that is now Shiloh National Military Park Visitor Center and Shiloh National Military Park/Pittsburg Landing Graveyard.

The Battle of Pittsburg Landing, also known as the Battle of Shiloh, was fought here on April 6–7, 1862. It had great significance as the first major battle of the Civil War in the west, marking the end of Confederate dominance in Tennessee, and it is commemorated in Shiloh National Military Park.
