= 148th Illinois Infantry Regiment =

148th Regiment Illinois Volunteer Infantry
- Illinois state flag
- Active: February 21, 1865, to September 5, 1865
- Country: United States
- Allegiance: Union
- Branch: Infantry

The 148th Regiment Illinois Volunteer Infantry was an infantry regiment that served in the Union Army during the American Civil War.

== Service ==
The 148th Illinois Infantry was organized at Camp Butler, Illinois, and mustered into Federal service on February 21, 1865, for a one-year enlistment. The 148th served in garrisons and operated against guerillas, first at Tullahoma, Tennessee, and alter along the line of the Nashville and Chattanooga Railroad.

The regiment was mustered out of service on September 5, 1865.

== Total strength and casualties ==
The regiment suffered 2 enlisted men killed in action or mortally wounded, and 1 officer and 70 enlisted men who died of disease for a total of 73 fatalities.

== Commanders ==
- Colonel Horace H. Willsie - mustered out with the regiment.

== See also ==
- List of Illinois Civil War Units
- Illinois in the American Civil War
