= XVI Corps (Union army) =

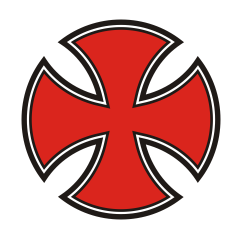
- XVI Corps badge
- Active: 1862–1865
- Country: United States of America
- Branch: Union Army
- Type: Army Corps
- Size: Corps
- Part of: Army of the Tennessee; Army of West Mississippi
- Engagements: American Civil War

Commanders
- Notable commanders: Grenville Dodge; Andrew Jackson Smith

Insignia
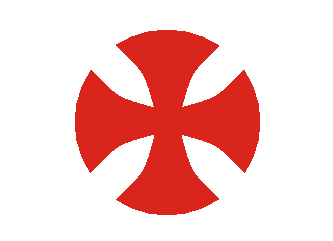
- 1st Division

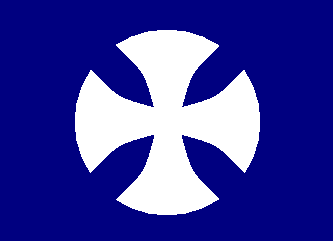
- 2nd Division

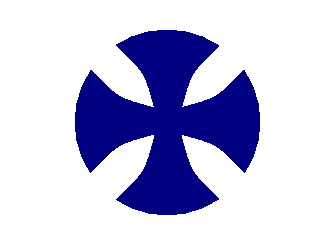
- 3rd Division

The XVI Army Corps was a corps of the Union Army during the American Civil War. The corps rarely fought as a single unit, as its divisions were often scattered across the country.

== History ==
=== Creation and Vicksburg ===
The XVI Corps was organized on December 18, 1862, with Maj. Gen. Stephen A. Hurlbut in command. It had four divisions commanded respectively by William Sooy Smith (1st Division), Grenville Dodge (2nd Division), Nathan Kimball (3rd Division) and Jacob G. Lauman (4th Division). These divisions were assigned to garrison duty in the vicinity of Memphis, Tennessee, LaGrange, Tennessee and Corinth, Mississippi. With the Army of the Tennessee besieging Vicksburg, Maj. Gen. Ulysses S. Grant gathered reinforcements from the surrounding areas. The divisions of Smith, Kimball and Lauman were ordered to Vicksburg on June 12. This detachment was led by Maj. Gen. Cadwallader C. Washburn. Hurlbut and Dodge remained on garrison duty in Tennessee during this time. After the fall of Vicksburg, Smith's division was attached to the IX Corps and Lauman's division was attached to the XIII Corps during Maj. Gen. William T. Sherman's expedition to Jackson, Mississippi.

In 1864, the corps was divided into two wings of two divisions each.

==== Left Wing ====
The Left Wing was led by Maj. Gen. Grenville Dodge and participated in Maj. Gen. William T. Sherman's Atlanta campaign. The left wing was composed of the divisions of Brig. Gen. Thomas W. Sweeny (2nd Division) and Brig. Gen. James C. Veatch (4th Division). These divisions fought notably at the Battle of Atlanta on July 22, 1864, holding off Confederate General John Bell Hood's flank attack. At this battle Veatch's division was led by Brig. Gen. John W. Fuller. General Dodge was struck in the head inspecting siege works outside Atlanta and Brig. Gen. Thomas E. G. Ransom was transferred from XVI Corps garrison duty at Corinth, Mississippi to take command of the Left Wing. Under Ransom were the divisions led by John M. Corse (after Sweeney's court-martial) and Fuller which were significantly engaged at the Battle of Jonesborough. The Left Wing was discontinued September 23, 1864. Fuller's Division became the First Division, XVII Corps and Corse's became Fourth Division, XV Corps.

==== Right Wing ====
The remaining division which did not join Sherman's Atlanta Campaign were left to guard the Mississippi River valley. Kimball's, Lauman's and William Sooy Smith's divisions were permanently removed to other corps while James Tuttle's division of the XV Corps and Andrew Jackson Smith's division of the XIII Corps were both transferred to the XVI Corps. Maj. Gen. Hurlbut assumed direct command over these divisions known as the Right Wing and participated in the Meridian Expedition in February 1864. During the Red River Campaign the Right Wing was attached to Maj. Gen. Nathaniel P. Banks' Army of the Gulf with Andrew J. Smith in command. Tuttle's 1st Division was now commanded by Joseph A. Mower and A.J. Smith's division was also attached to Mower's command. One division from the XVII Corps was attached to the Right Wing. This division was dubbed the "Red River Division" and was commanded by Thomas Kilby Smith.

The Red River Division remained in Louisiana while A.J. Smith took the rest of the Right Wing into Mississippi to protect Sherman's supply lines during the Atlanta Campaign, defeating the Confederates at the Battle of Tupelo. Here the two divisions were commanded by Mower (1st Division) and Colonel David Moore (2nd Division) with a division of cavalry temporarily attached under Brig. Gen. Benjamin Grierson.

This unit was sometimes called "General A.J. Smith's Guerrillas".

=== Dissolution ===
The corps in its entirety was discontinued on November 7, 1864. Andrew J. Smith remained in command of his two divisions and were sent to Missouri to help defeat Sterling Prices's Missouri Raid. During this time Smith's command, once known as the Right Wing-XVI Corps, was now officially titled "Detachment-Army of the Tennessee". Smith was then sent to Tennessee to join with Maj. Gen. George H. Thomas for the battle of Nashville. At Nashville Smith had three divisions being commanded respectively by John McArthur, Kenner Garrard and Col. Jonathan B. Moore. McArthur's division took a prominent part in both days of the battle.

=== Re-activation ===
On February 18, 1865, Smith's Detachment-Army of the Tennessee became the official XVI Corps. It was composed of three divisions: First (McArthur), Second (Garrard) and Third (Carr). The composition remained virtually the same as it had at Nashville except Brig. Gen. Eugene A. Carr replaced Col. Moore in command of the 3rd Division. It served in the operations of Maj. Gen. Edward Canby against Mobile, Alabama and fought in the battles of Spanish Fort and Fort Blakeley. The latter ended on April 9, 1865, the day Lee surrendered at Appomattox. The corps was finally disbanded on July 20, 1865.
