= XIII Corps (Union army) =

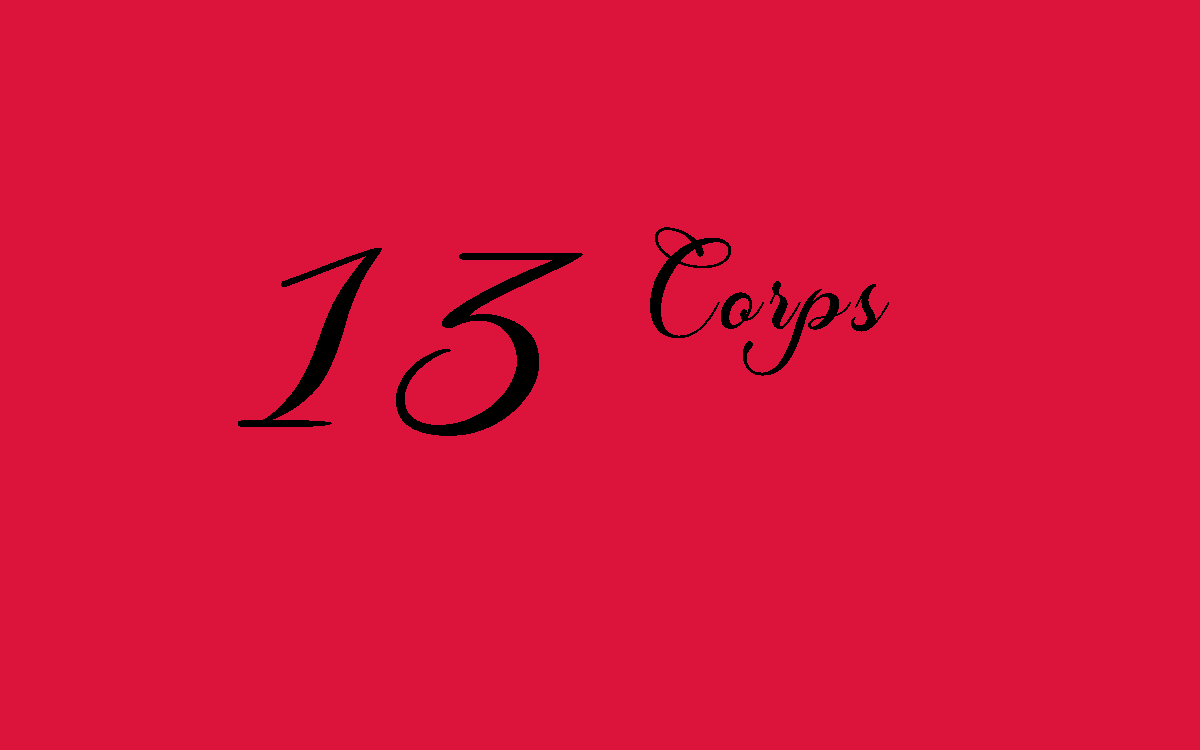
- XIII Corps Flag
- Active: 1862–1865
- Country: United States of America
- Branch: Union Army
- Type: Army Corps
- Size: Corps
- Part of: Army of Tennessee; Department of the Gulf
- Engagements: American Civil War

Commanders
- Notable commanders: Ulysses S. Grant; John A. McClernand; Edward O.C. Ord

XIII Corps was a corps of the Union Army during the American Civil War. It was first led by Ulysses S. Grant and later by John A. McClernand and Edward O.C. Ord. It served in the Western Theater of civil war, Trans-Mississippi Theater and along the Gulf of Mexico.

== Corps History ==
=== Creation ===
The XIII Corps, along with the XIV Corps, were both put into commission on October 24, 1862 with the passing of General Orders No. 168. These two corps were the first corps created in the Western Theater. While the XIV Corps constituted all forces under the command of William S. Rosecrans, the XIII Corps likewise constituted all the forces under Ulysses S. Grant.

Because of the corps' immense size and the fact that it was virtually synonymous with the Army of the Tennessee, Grant chose to subdivide the corps into the Right, Left and Center wings. In December 1862 it was officially divided into the XIII Corps, XV Corps, XVI Corps and XVII Corps. Grant remained in command of the Army of the Tennessee and John A. McClernand assumed command of the XIII Corps. Before the official order was passed along to all the wing commanders, William T. Sherman, commander of the Right Wing, embarked on an expedition against Vicksburg. Sherman's wing of the XIII Corps fought the Battle of Chickasaw Bayou on December 26–29. Although the official date which the Right Wing was designated the XV Corps was December 22, most of the reports regarding the battle at Chickasaw Bluffs still refer to the Union forces as part of the XIII Corps. No matter the designation, it was the first time many of the troops had been under fire.

=== Arkansas Post ===
Adding to the identity crisis the XIII Corps faced in its early years was John A. McClernand's expedition against Fort Hindman at Arkansas Post. McClernand was given his XIII Corps and Sherman's XV Corps (now officially using that designation). McClernand labeled these forces the Army of the Mississippi and renamed the XIII Corps "I Corps" and the XV Corps "II Corps". McClernand commanded the Army and placed General George W. Morgan in command of the I Corps (former XIII Corps). The divisions of Andrew J. Smith and Peter J. Osterhaus participated in the battle. Only Stephen Burbridge's brigade of Smith's division bore any heavy fighting.

=== Vicksburg ===
With the impending campaign against Vicksburg, Grant took personal command of the operation. McClernand returned to corps command and the Army of the Mississippi was merged back into the Army of the Tennessee and the XIII Corps took on its official title. As the Vicksburg campaign opened the XIII Corps was composed of the 9th, 10th, 11th, 12th, 13th and 14th Divisions commanded respectively by Osterhaus, Andrew Jackson Smith, Alvin P. Hovey, Leonard F. Ross and Eugene A. Carr. Ross' division was stationed in Arkansas during the entire campaign and did not participate in any engagements with the rest of the corps. In July, this division (now led by Frederick Salomon) fought at the Battle of Helena as part of the District of Eastern Arkansas under Benjamin M. Prentiss.

The Battle of Port Gibson was fought by the XIII Corps, with the aid of a portion of the XVII Corps. McClernand did not bring the full force of the corps to bear at the Battle of Champion Hill but Hovey's division led the attack on the Confederate right. Immediately following the victory at Champion's Hill the Battle of Big Black River Bridge was again fought exclusively by the XIII Corps, Carr's division bearing the brunt of the fight.

When Grant initiated siege operations the XIII Corps took up a position on the Union left. During the assaults on Vicksburg the XIII Corps lost nearly 1,500 soldiers.

McClernand had been a long time thorn in Grant's side and on June 19, Grant found an opportunity to remove him from command. His replacement was Edward O. C. Ord, a friend of Grant's who had just recovered from a wound sustained in 1862. Ord led the corps throughout the rest of the siege. After Vicksburg fell, William T. Sherman led an expedition back to Jackson, Mississippi to clear the city of Confederates which had gathered there. Sherman took with him the XIII Corps and attached to it the division under Jacob G. Lauman from the XVI Corps. General Carr, who temporarily left the army due to sickness, had been replaced in division command by William P. Benton.

=== Texas and Louisiana ===
After the fall of Jackson the corps returned to Vicksburg and then transferred to the Department of the Gulf. The District of Eastern Arkansas had been detached from the Corps; AJ Smith had been reassigned to command a post in Tennessee; Osterhaus had been reassigned to command a division in the XV Corps; Hovey took leave of the army due to the death of his wife; two of the divisions in the field were consolidated under the command of Cadwallader C. Washburn; and General Herron's division was attached.

General Banks used the XIII Corps to conduct his coastal campaign against Texas during the fall of 1863, capturing Brownsville. By February 1864 corps headquarters were in Texas and General McClernand had returned to command.

=== Red River ===
The 1st and 2nd Divisions remained in Texas but Nathaniel P. Banks took with him the 3rd and 4th Divisions during the Red River Campaign. During the first part of the campaign the corps was commanded by Thomas E. G. Ransom, the 3rd Division by General Robert A. Cameron and the 4th Division by Colonel William J. Landram. The corps fought at the Battle of Mansfield. Ransom was wounded at Mansfield and was succeeded in command of the corps by General Cameron. A few weeks later Michael K. Lawler of the 1st Division in Texas became the official corps commander. General McClernand however assumed direct command of the two divisions fighting in Louisiana under Banks. McClernand was relieved of command due to ill health and Lawler himself personally commanded this detachment. Shortly after William P. Benton was assigned to the corps command but Lawler remained in command of the detachment in Louisiana. Lawler led the XIII Corps Detachment at the Battle of Mansura.

=== Mobile ===
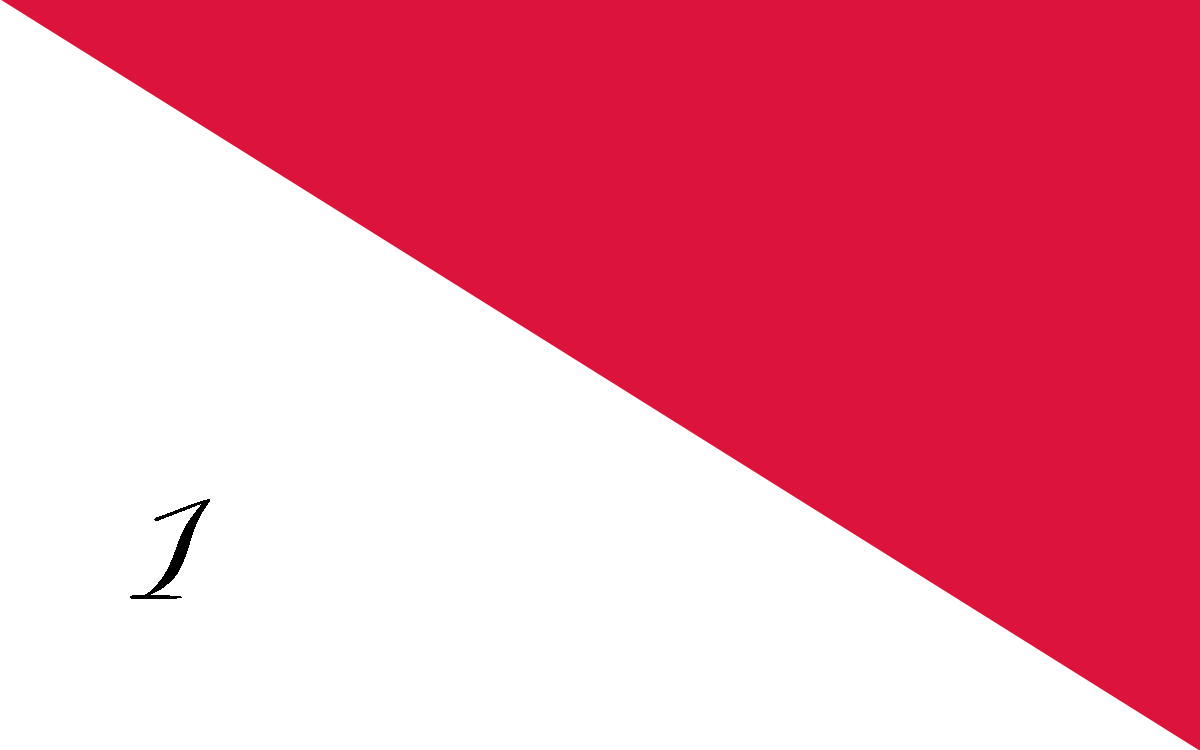
13th Corps I Division Flag

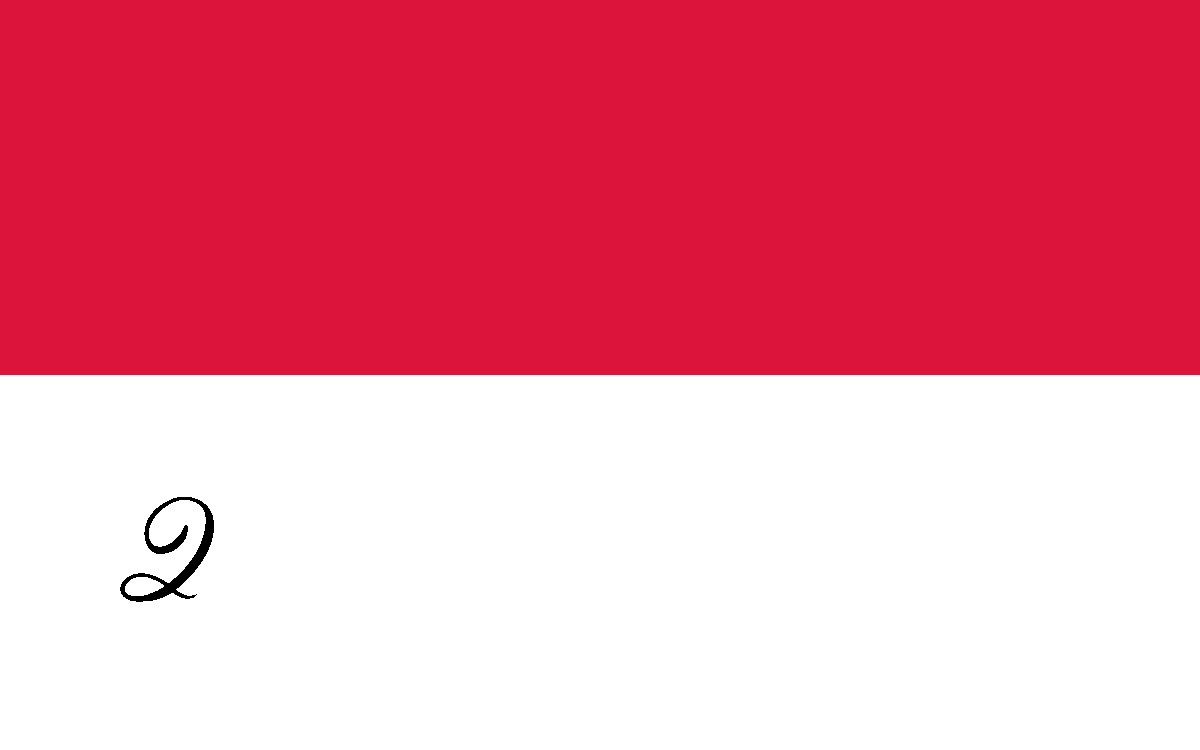
13th Corps II Division Flag

The corps was discontinued on June 11, 1864. On February 18, 1865 it was reorganized under the command of Gordon Granger with three divisions commanded respectively by James C. Veatch, Christopher C. Andrews and William P. Benton. This new form of the XIII Corps fought in the Battle of Fort Blakeley which led to the fall of the city of Mobile, Alabama. In June 1865, more than two thousand Federal soldiers of the 13th Army Corps arrived in Galveston, with Major General Gordon Granger, Commanding Officer, District of Texas. Granger delivered to Galveston General Orders, No.3 and No.4 on June 19, 1865. General Order No.3 informed all Texans that, "in accordance with a Proclamation from the Executive of the United States, all slaves were free." This day became known as Juneteenth among the newly freed slaves. The corps was discontinued for the final time July 20, 1865.

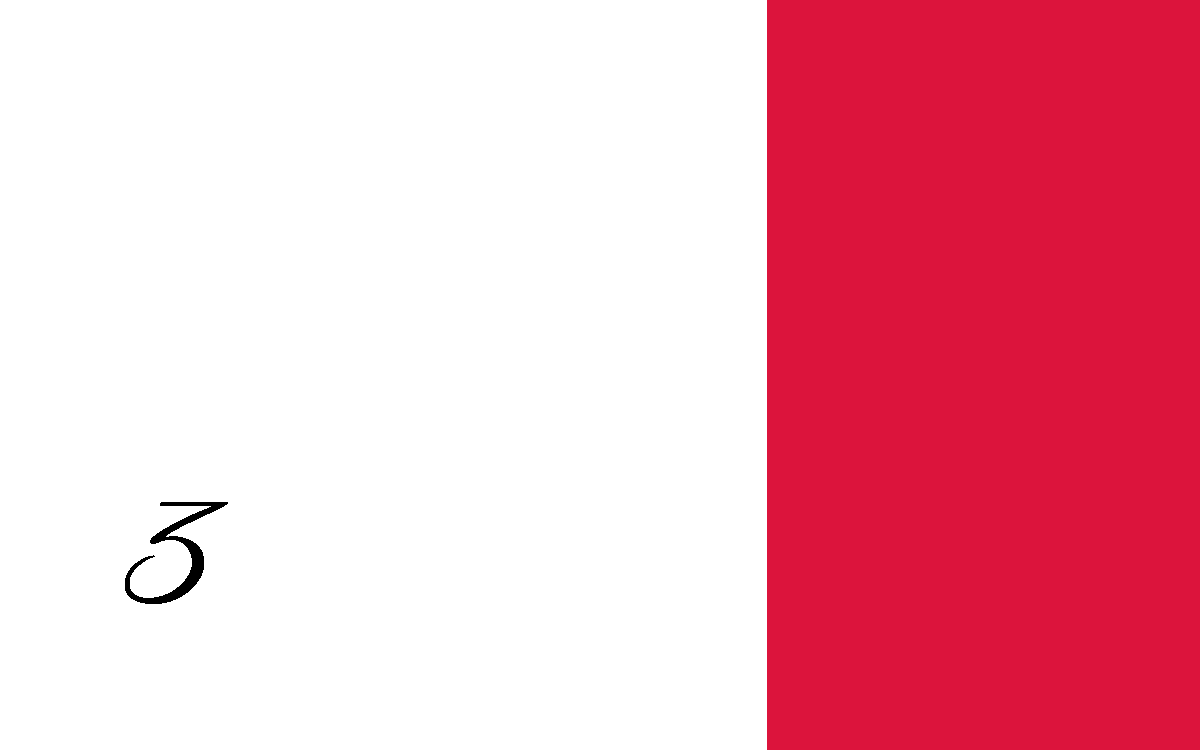
13th Corps III Division Flag

The men of the XIII Corps were never assigned a designated official corps badge and therefore never wore any form of a corps badge during the war.

== Sources ==
- www.civilwararchive.com
