= Battle of Shiloh order of battle: Union =

Union forces at 1862 American Civil War battle

The following Union Army units and commanders fought in the Battle of Shiloh of the American Civil War. The Confederate order of battle is shown separately. Order of battle compiled from the army organization, return of casualties and reports.

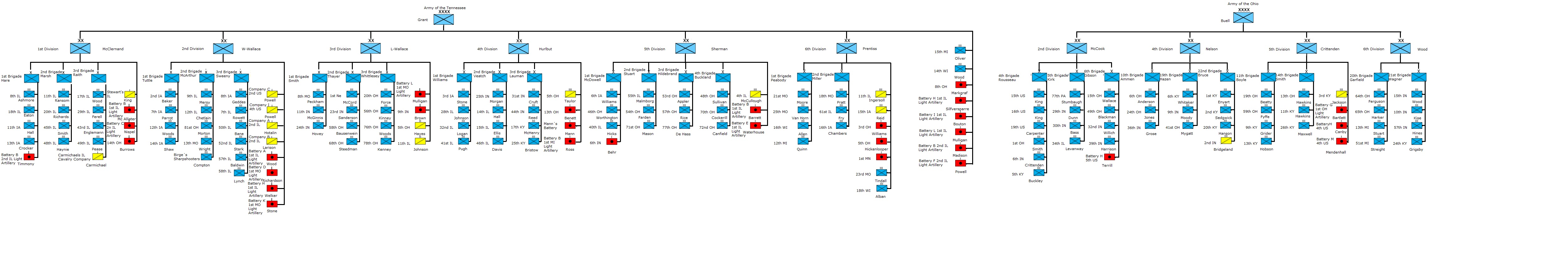
Union forces at Shiloh

== Abbreviations used ==
=== Military rank ===
- MG = Major General
- BG = Brigadier General
- Col = Colonel
- Ltc = Lieutenant Colonel
- Maj = Major
- Cpt = Captain
- Lt = Lieutenant

=== Artillery ===
- 3" R = 3 inch caliber ordnance rifle
- How = Howitzer
- lb = pound (projectile weight)
- Nap = M1857 Napoleon Gun
- R = Rifled Gun
- SB = Smoothbore Gun

=== Other ===
- w = wounded
- mw = mortally wounded
- k = killed
- c = captured

== Army of the Tennessee ==
MG Ulysses S. Grant, Commanding

General Staff & Headquarters

- Chief of Staff: Col Joseph D. Webster
- Chief of Engineers: Col James B. McPherson
- Assistant Adjutant General: Cpt. John A. Rawlins
- Chief Commissary: Cpt. John Parker Hawkins

Division	Brigade	Regiments and Others
First Division MG John A. McClernand	1st Brigade; K-104, W-467, M-9 = 580 Col Abraham M. Hare (w); Col Marcellus M. Crocker	8th Illinois: Cpt James M. Ashmore (w), Cpt William H. Harvey (k), Cpt Robert H. Sturgess K-30, W-91; 18th Illinois: Maj Samuel Eaton (mw), Cpt Daniel H. Brush (w), Cpt William J. Dillon (k), Cpt Jabez J. Anderson K-17, W-68; 11th Iowa: Ltc William Hall (w) K-33, W-160, M-1; 13th Iowa: Col Marcellus M. Crocker K-20, W-139, M-3; Battery D, 2nd Illinois Light Artillery (6 James R): Cpt James P. Timmony K-4, W-9
First Division MG John A. McClernand	2nd Brigade; K-80, W-475, M-30 = 583 Col C. Carroll Marsh	11th Illinois: Ltc Thomas E. G. Ransom (w), Maj Garrett Nevins (w), Cpt Lloyd D. Waddell K-17, W-69; 20th Illinois: Ltc Evan Richards (w), Maj Frederick A. Bartleson (w), Cpt Orton Frisbie K-22, W-107; 45th Illinois: Col John E. Smith K-23, W-187; 48th Illinois: Col Isham N. Haynie (w), Ltc William W. Sanford (w), Maj Manning Mayfield K-18, W-112
First Division MG John A. McClernand	3rd Brigade; K-96, W-393, M-46 = 535 Col Julius Raith (mw); Ltc Enos P. Wood	17th Illinois: Ltc Enos P. Wood, Maj Francis M. Smith K-15, W-118; 29th Illinois: Ltc Charles M. Ferrell K-12, W-73; 43rd Illinois: Ltc Adolph Englemann K-50, W-118; 49th Illinois: Ltc Phineas Pease (w) K-19, W-83; Carmichael's Company Illinois Cavalry: Cpt Eagleton Carmichael
First Division MG John A. McClernand	Not brigaded K-5, W-35, M-0 = 40	Stewart's Company Illinois Cavalry: Lt Ezra King K-0, W-3; Battery D, 1st Illinois Light Artillery (4 24 lb how): Cpt Edward McAllister (w) K-1, W-4; Battery E, 2nd Illinois Light Artillery (2 6lb SB, 2 12lb how): Lt George L. Nispel; 14th Ohio Battery (4 6 lb Wiard R, 2 12 lb Wiard R): Cpt Jerome B. Burrows (w) K-4, W-25
Second Division BG W.H.L. Wallace (mw); Col James M. Tuttle	1st Brigade; K-39, W-143, M-676 = 858 Col James M. Tuttle; Ltc James Baker	2nd Iowa: Ltc James Baker K-8, W-60, M-4; 7th Iowa: Ltc James C. Parrott K-10, W-17, M-6; 12th Iowa: Col Joseph J. Woods (w/c), Cpt Samuel R. Edgington (c) K-12, W-37, M-320; 14th Iowa (7 companies): Col William T. Shaw K-9, W-28, M-126
Second Division BG W.H.L. Wallace (mw); Col James M. Tuttle	2nd Brigade; K-99, W-470, M-11 = 580 BG John McArthur (w); Col Thomas Morton	9th Illinois: Col August Mersy K-61, W-281; 12th Illinois: Ltc Augustus L. Chetlain, Cpt James R. Hugunin K-22, W-71; 81st Ohio: Col Thomas Morton K-4, W-17; 13th Missouri: Col Crafts J. Wright K-10, W-67; Birge's Western Sharpshooters (14th Missouri): Col Benjamin S. Compton (15th Missouri) K-2, W-6
Second Division BG W.H.L. Wallace (mw); Col James M. Tuttle	3rd Brigade; K-127, W-501, M-619 = 1,247 Col Thomas W. Sweeny (w); Col Silas D. Baldwin	8th Iowa: Col James L. Geddes K-34, W-112, M-370; 7th Illinois: Maj Richard Rowett K-17, W-79; 50th Illinois: Col Moses M. Bane (w), Cpt Thomas W. Gaines K-12, W-66; 52nd Illinois: Maj Henry Stark, Cpt Edwin A. Bowen K-23, W-120; 57th Illinois: Col Silas D. Baldwin, Cpt Gustav A. Busse K-25, W-103; 58th Illinois: Col William F. LynchK-20, W-39
Second Division BG W.H.L. Wallace (mw); Col James M. Tuttle	Not brigaded K-1, W-5, M-0 = 6	Company C, 2nd U.S. Cavalry: Lt James Powell; Company I, 4th U.S. Cavalry: Lt James Powell; 2nd Illinois Cavalry (Company A): Cpt John R. Hotaling; 2nd Illinois Cavalry (Company B): Cpt Thomas J. Larison; Battery A, 1st Illinois Light Artillery (4 6 lb SB, 2 12 lb how): Lt Peter P. Wood K-4, W-26; Battery D, 1st Missouri Light Artillery (4 20 lb Parrott R): Cpt Henry Richardson K-0, W-6; Battery H, 1st Missouri Light Artillery (2 20 lb, 2 10 lb Parrott R): Cpt Frederick Welker K-0, W-17; Battery K, 1st Missouri Light Artillery (4 10 lb Parrott R): Cpt George H. Stone K-0, W-4
Third Division MG Lew Wallace	1st Brigade; K-18, W-114, M-0 = 132 Col Morgan L. Smith	8th Missouri: Ltc James Peckham; 11th Indiana: Col George Francis McGinnis K-11, W-51; 24th Indiana: Col Alvin Peterson Hovey K-6, W-45
Third Division MG Lew Wallace	2nd Brigade; K-20, W-99, M-3 = 122 Col John M. Thayer	1st Nebraska: Ltc William D. McCord K-4, W-22; 23rd Indiana: Col William L. Sanderson K-7, W-35; 58th Ohio: Col Valentine Bausenwein K-9, W-42; 68th Ohio: Col Samuel H. Steedman (not engaged)
Third Division MG Lew Wallace	3rd Brigade; K-2, W-32, M-1 = 35 Col Charles Whittlesey	20th Ohio: Ltc Manning F. Force; 56th Ohio: Col Peter Kinney (not engaged); 76th Ohio: Col Charles R. Woods K-0, W-4; 78th Ohio: Col Mortimer Dormer Leggett K-1, W-9
Third Division MG Lew Wallace	Not brigaded K-1, W-6, M-0 = 7	Battery L, 1st Missouri Light Artillery (4 6 lb SB, 2 12lb how); 9th Indiana Battery (4 6lb SB, 2 12lb how): Lt George R. Brown K-1, W-5; 5th Ohio Cavalry, 3rd Battalion: Maj Charles S. Hayes; 11th Illinois Cavalry, 3rd battalion: Maj James F. Johnson
Fourth Division BG Stephen A. Hurlbut	1st Brigade; K-112, W-532, M-43 = 687 Col Nelson G. Williams (w); Col Isaac C. Pugh	3rd Iowa: Maj William M. Stone (c), Lt George W. Crosley K-23, W-134, M-30; 28th Illinois: Col Amory K. Johnson K-29, W-211; 32nd Illinois: Col John Logan (w) K-39, W-114; 41st Illinois: Col Isaac C. Pugh, Ltc Ansel Tupper (k), Maj John Warner, Cpt John N. Hale K-21, W-73
Fourth Division BG Stephen A. Hurlbut	2nd Brigade; K-130, W-492, M-8 = 630 Col James C. Veatch	25th Indiana: Ltc William H. Morgan (w), Maj John W. Foster; 14th Illinois: Col Cyrus Hall K-35, W-126; 15th Illinois: Ltc Edward F. W. Ellis (k), Maj William R. Goddard (k), Cpt Louis D. Kelley K-49, W-117; 46th Illinois: Col John A. Davis (w), Ltc John J. Jones K-25, W-134
Fourth Division BG Stephen A. Hurlbut	3rd Brigade; K-70, W-384, M-4 = 458 BG Jacob G. Lauman	31st Indiana: Col Charles Cruft (w), Ltc John Osborn; 44th Indiana: Col Hugh B. Reed K-24, W-174; 17th Kentucky: Col John H. McHenry, Jr. K-18, W-69; 25th Kentucky: Ltc Benjamin H. Bristow K-7, W-27
Fourth Division BG Stephen A. Hurlbut	Not brigaded K-5, W-33, M-56 = 97	5th Ohio Cavalry, 1st & 2nd battalions: Col William H. Taylor; 13th Ohio Battery (one section) K-1, W-8; Mann's battery, Missouri Light Artillery (2 6 lb SB, 2 12lb How) K-3, W-14; Battery B 1st Michigan Light Artillery (2 6 lb SB, 4 10 lb Parrot R) K-0, W-5
Fifth Division BG William T. Sherman (w)	1st Brigade; K-137, W-444, M-70 = 651 Col John A. McDowell	6th Iowa: Cpt John W. Williams (w), Cpt Madison Miner Walden K-52, W-94, M-37; 46th Ohio: Col Thomas Worthington K-37, W-185; 40th Illinois: Col Stephen G. Hicks (w), Ltc James W. Boothe K-47, W-160; 6th Indiana Battery: Cpt Frederick Behr (k) K-1, W-5
Fifth Division BG William T. Sherman (w)	2nd Brigade; K-80, W-380, M-90 = 550 Col David Stuart (w); Ltc Oscar Malmborg; Col Thomas Kilby Smith	55th Illinois: Ltc Oscar Malmborg; 54th Ohio: Col Thomas Kilby Smith, Ltc James A. Farden K-15, W-139; 71st Ohio: Col Rodney Mason K-14, W-44
Fifth Division BG William T. Sherman (w)	3rd Brigade; K-70, W-221, M-65 = 356 Col Jesse Hildebrand	53rd Ohio: Col Jesse J. Appler, Ltc Robert A. Fulton; 57th Ohio: Ltc Americus V. Rice K-10, W-72; 77th Ohio: Ltc Wills De Hass, Maj Benjamin D. Fearing K-51, W-116
Fifth Division BG William T. Sherman (w)	4th Brigade; K-36, W-203, M-74 = 313 Col Ralph P. Buckland	48th Ohio: Col Peter J. Sullivan (w), Ltc Job R. Parker; 70th Ohio: Col Joseph R. Cockerill K-9, W-57; 72nd Ohio: Ltc Herman Canfield (k) K-15, W-73
Fifth Division BG William T. Sherman (w)	Not brigaded K-2, W-28, M-0 = 30	4th Illinois Cavalry (1st & 2nd battalions): Ltc William McCullough K-0, W-6; Battery B, 1st Illinois Light Artillery (4 6 lb SB, 2 12 lb How): Cpt Samuel E. Barrett K-1, W-5; Battery E, 1st Illinois Light Artillery (4 James R): Cpt Allen C. Waterhouse (w), Lt Abial R. Abbott (w), Lt John A. Fitch K-1, W-17
Sixth Division BG Benjamin M. Prentiss (c)	1st Brigade; K-113, W-372, M-263 = 721 Col Everett Peabody (k); Col John L. Doran	21st Missouri: Col David Moore (w), Ltc Humphrey M. Woodyard; 25th Missouri: Ltc Robert T. Van Horn K-28, W-84; 16th Wisconsin: Col Benjamin Allen (w) K-40, W-188; 12th Michigan: Col Francis Quinn K-27, W-54
Sixth Division BG Benjamin M. Prentiss (c)	2nd Brigade; K-44, W-228, M-178 = 450 Col Madison Miller (c)	18th Missouri: Ltc Issac V. Pratt; 61st Illinois: Col Jacob Fry K-12, W-42; 16th Iowa: Col Alexander Chambers (w), Ltc Addison H. Sanders K-17, W-101, M-13
Sixth Division BG Benjamin M. Prentiss (c)	Not brigaded K-78, W-328, M-592 = 998	11th Illinois Cavalry (8 companies): Col Robert G. Ingersoll K-3, W-3; 15th Iowa: Col Hugh Thompson Reid (w) K-21, W-156, M-8; 3rd Ohio Battery: Cpt William S. Williams; 5th Ohio Battery: Cpt Andrew Hickenlooper K-1, W-19; 1st Minnesota Battery - 2 12 lb How, 4 James R K-3, W-8; 23rd Missouri: Col Jacob T. Tindall (k), Ltc Quin Morton (c) K-27, W-59; 18th Wisconsin: Col James S. Alban (k), Ltc Samuel W. Beall (w), Maj Josiah W. Crane (k) K-23, W-83
	Unassigned troops K-39, W-159, M-17 = 215	15th Michigan: Col John M. Oliver (temporarily attached to the 4th Brigade, Army of the Ohio); 14th Wisconsin: Col David E. Wood K-16, W-74; 8th Ohio Battery (6 30 lb Parrott R): Cpt Louis Markgraf K-0, W-3; Battery H, 1st Illinois Light Artillery (4 20 lb Parrott R): Cpt Axel Silversparre; Battery I, 1st Illinois Light Artillery (4 6 lb James R): Cpt Edward Bouton; Battery L, 1st Illinois Light Artillery (6 James R); Battery B, 2nd Illinois Light Artillery (5 24 lb SB): Cpt Relly Madison; Battery F, 2nd Illinois Light Artillery (6 6 lb SB): Cpt John Wesley Powell (w) K-0, W-6

== Army of the Ohio ==
MG Don Carlos Buell, Commanding

- Chief of Staff: Col James B. Fry
- Assistant Adjutant General: Cpt. John M. Wright
- Topographical Engineer: Cpt. Nathaniel Michler
- Assistant Quartermaster: Cpt. Alvan C. Gillem
- Assistant Inspector General: Cpt. Charles C. Gilbert

Division	Brigade	Regiments and Others
Second Division BG Alexander M. McCook	4th Brigade; K-28, W-280, M-3 = 311 BG Lovell H. Rousseau	Regular Infantry Detachment: Maj John H. King; 15th U.S. Infantry, First Battalion (8 companies): Cpt Peter T. Swaine; 16th U.S. Infantry, First Battalion (7 companies): Cpt Edwin F. Townsend; 19th U.S. Infantry, First Battalion (6 companies): Maj Stephen D. Carpenter; 1st Ohio: Col Benjamin F. Smith; 6th Indiana: Col Thomas Turpin Crittenden; 5th Kentucky: Col Harvey M. Buckley; Battery H, 5th U.S. Artillery (4 12 lb Nap, 2 10 lb Parrott R): Cpt William R. Terrill
Second Division BG Alexander M. McCook	5th Brigade; K-34, W-310, M-2 = 346 Col Edward N. Kirk (w)	77th Pennsylvania: Col. Frederick S. Stumbaugh; 29th Indiana: Ltc David M. Dunn; 30th Indiana: Col Sion S. Bass (mw), Ltc Joseph B. Dodge, Maj Orin Hurd; 34th Illinois: Maj Charles N. Levanway (k), Cpt Hiram W. Bristol
Second Division BG Alexander M. McCook	6th Brigade; K-25, W-220, M-2 = 247 Col William H. Gibson	15th Ohio: Maj William Wallace; 49th Ohio: Ltc Albert M. Blackman; 32nd Indiana: Col August Willich; 39th Indiana: Col Thomas J. Harrison
Fourth Division BG William Nelson	10th Brigade; K-16, W-106, M-8 = 130 Col Jacob Ammen	6th Ohio: Ltc Nicholas Longworth Anderson; 24th Ohio: Col Frederick C. Jones; 36th Indiana: Col William Grose (w)
Fourth Division BG William Nelson	19th Brigade; K-48, W-357, M-1 = 406 Col William B. Hazen	6th Kentucky: Col Walter C. Whitaker; 9th Indiana: Col Gideon C. Moody; 41st Ohio: Ltc George S. Mygatt
Fourth Division BG William Nelson	22nd Brigade; K-29, W-138, M-11 = 178 Col Sanders D. Bruce	1st Kentucky: Col David A. Enyart; 2nd Kentucky: Col Thomas D. Sedgewick; 20th Kentucky: Ltc Charles S. Hanson; 2nd Indiana Cavalry: Ltc Edward M. McCook
Fifth Division BG Thomas L. Crittenden	11th Brigade; K-33, W-212, M-18 = 263 BG Jeremiah T. Boyle	19th Ohio: Col Samuel Beatty; 59th Ohio: Col James P. Fyffe; 9th Kentucky: Col Benjamin C. Grider; 13th Kentucky: Col Edward H. Hobson
Fifth Division BG Thomas L. Crittenden	14th Brigade; K-25, W-157, M-10 = 192 Col William S. Smith	13th Ohio: Ltc Joseph G. Hawkins; 11th Kentucky: Col Pierce B. Hawkins; 26th Kentucky: Ltc Cicero Maxwell
Fifth Division BG Thomas L. Crittenden	Not brigaded K-2, W-8, M-0 = 10	3rd Kentucky Cavalry: Col James S. Jackson; Battery G, 1st Ohio Light Artillery (4 6 lb SB, 2 12 lb Wiard R): Cpt Joseph Bartlett; Batteries H and M, 4th U.S. Artillery (2 3" R, 2 12 lb How); Cpt John Mendenhall
Sixth Division BG Thomas J. Wood	20th Brigade; K-0, W-0, M-0 = 0 BG James A. Garfield	64th Ohio: Col John Ferguson; 65th Ohio: Col Charles Garrison Harker; 13th Michigan: Col Michael Shoemaker; 51st Indiana: Col Abel D. Streight
Sixth Division BG Thomas J. Wood	21st Brigade; K-0, W-4, M-0 = 4 Col George D. Wagner	15th Indiana: Ltc Gustavus A. Wood; 10th Indiana: Col Mahlon D. Manson; 57th Indiana: Col Cyrus C. Hines; 24th Kentucky: Col Louis Grigsby
