= Battle of Shiloh order of battle =

The order of battle for the Battle of Shiloh includes:

- Battle of Shiloh order of battle: Confederate
- Battle of Shiloh order of battle: Union
