= Battle of Shiloh order of battle: Confederate =

Confederate forces at 1862 American Civil War battle

The following Confederate States Army units and commanders fought in the Battle of Shiloh of the American Civil War. The Union order of battle is shown separately. Order of battle compiled from the army organization during the battle.

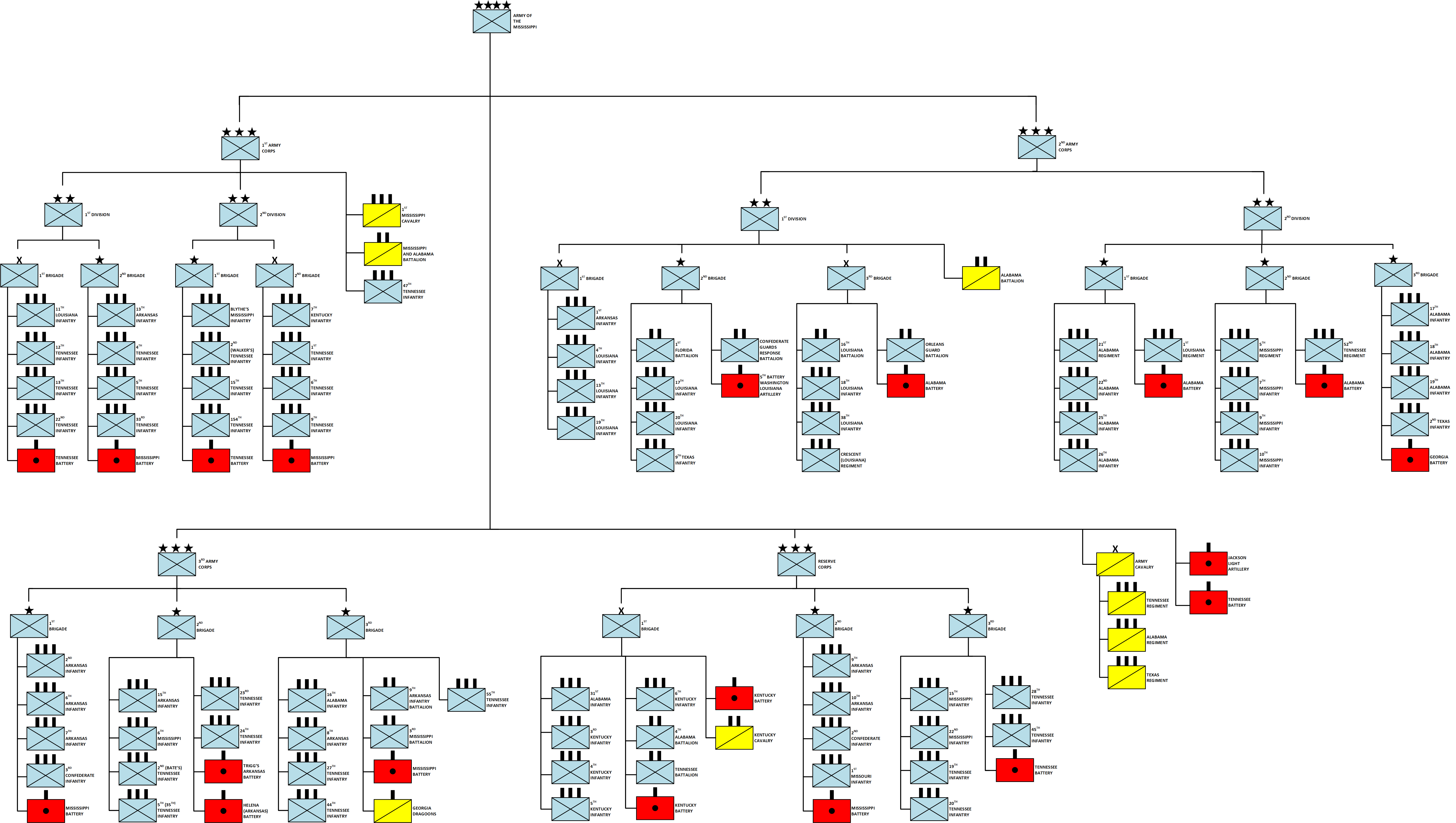
Confederate Army of the Mississippi as organized during the Battle of Shiloh

== Abbreviations used ==
=== Military rank ===
- Gen = General
- MG = Major General
- BG = Brigadier General
- Col = Colonel
- Ltc = Lieutenant Colonel
- Maj = Major
- Cpt = Captain
- Lt = Lieutenant

=== Other ===
- (w) = wounded
- (mw) = mortally wounded
- (k) = killed in action
- (c) = captured

== Army of Mississippi ==
Gen Albert S. Johnston (k)
Gen Pierre G. T. Beauregard

=== First Army Corps ===
MG Leonidas Polk

Division	Brigade	Regiments and Others
First Division; BG Charles Clark (w); BG Alexander P. Stewart	1st Brigade Col Robert M. Russell	11th Louisiana: Col Samuel F. Marks (w), Ltc Robert H. Barrow; 12th Tennessee: Ltc Tyree H. Bell, Maj Robert P. Caldwell; 13th Tennessee: Col Alfred J. Vaughan, jr.; 22nd Tennessee: Col Thomas J. Freeman (w), Ltc Francis M. Stewart (w), Maj Lipscomb P. McMurry; Tennessee Battery: Cpt Smith P. Bankhead
First Division; BG Charles Clark (w); BG Alexander P. Stewart	2nd Brigade BG Alexander P. Stewart	13th Arkansas: Col James C. Tappan, Ltc A. D. Grayson (k), Maj James A. McNeely (w); 4th Tennessee: Col Rufus P. Neely, Ltc Otho F. Strahl; 5th Tennessee: Ltc Calvin D. Venable; 33rd Tennessee: Col Alexander W. Campbell; Mississippi Battery: Cpt Thomas J. Stanford
Second Division; BG Benjamin F. Cheatham (w); BG Bushrod R. Johnson (w)	1st Brigade BG Bushrod R. Johnson; Col Preston Smith (w)	Blythe's Mississippi: Col A. K. Blythe (k), Ltc David L. Herron (k), Maj James Moore; 2nd (Walker's) Tennessee: Col J. Knox Walker; 15th Tennessee: Ltc Robert C. Tyler (w), Maj John F. Hearn; 154th (Senior) Tennessee: Col Preston Smith, Ltc Marcus J. Wright; Tennessee battery: Cpt Marshall T. Polk (w)
Second Division; BG Benjamin F. Cheatham (w); BG Bushrod R. Johnson (w)	2nd Brigade Col William H. Stephens; Col George Maney	7th Kentucky: Col Charles Wickliffe (mw), Ltc William D. Lannom; 1st Tennessee (battalion): Col George Maney, Maj Hume R. Feild; 6th Tennessee: Ltc Timothy P. Jones, Col William H. Stephens; 9th Tennessee: Col Henry L. Douglass; Mississippi Battery: Cpt Melancthon Smith
	Cavalry	1st Mississippi: Col Andrew J. Lindsay; Mississippi and Alabama Battalion: Ltc Richard H. Brewer
	Unattached	47th Tennessee: Col Munson R. Hill

=== Second Army Corps ===
MG Braxton Bragg

Escort:

- Alabama Cavalry: Cpt Robert W. Smith

Division	Brigade	Regiments and Others
First Division; BG Daniel Ruggles	1st Brigade Col Randall L. Gibson	1st Arkansas: Col James F. Fagan; 4th Louisiana: Col Henry W. Allen (w), Ltc Samuel E. Hunter; 13th Louisiana: Maj Anatole P. Avegno (mw), Cpt Stephen O'Leary (w), Cpt Edgar M. Dubroca; 19th Louisiana: Col Benjamin L. Hodge, Ltc James M. Hollingsworth
First Division; BG Daniel Ruggles	2nd Brigade BG Patton Anderson	1st Florida Battalion: Maj Thaddens A. McDonell (w), Cpt W. G. Poole, Cpt W. Capers Bird; 17th Louisiana: Ltc Charles Jones (w); 20th Louisiana: Col August Reichard; 9th Texas: Col Wright A. Stanley; Confederate Guards Response Battalion (12th Louisiana Bn.): Maj Franklin H. Clack; Washington Louisiana Artillery, 5th Company: Cpt W. Irwin Hodgson
First Division; BG Daniel Ruggles	3rd Brigade Col Preston Pond, Jr.	16th Louisiana: Maj Daniel Gober; 18th Louisiana: Col Alfred Mouton (w), Ltc Alfred Roman; Crescent (Louisiana) Regiment: Col Marshall J. Smith; Orleans Guard Battalion: Maj Leon Querouze (w); 38th Tennessee: Col Robert F. Looney; Alabama Battery: Cpt William H. Ketchum
First Division; BG Daniel Ruggles	Cavalry	Alabama Battalion: Cpt Thomas F. Jenkins
Second Division; BG Jones M. Withers	1st Brigade BG Adley H. Gladden (mw); Col Daniel W. Adams (w); Col Zach C. Deas (w)	21st Alabama: Ltc Stewart W. Cayce, Maj Frederik Stewart; 22nd Alabama: Col Zach C. Deas, Ltc John C. Marrast; 25th Alabama: Col John Q. Loomis (w), Maj George D. Johnston; 26th (Coltart's) Alabama: Col John G. Coltart (w), Ltc William D. Chadick; 1st Louisiana: Col Daniel W. Adams, Maj Frederick H. Farrar, Jr.; Alabama Battery: Cpt Felix H. Robertson
Second Division; BG Jones M. Withers	2nd Brigade BG James R. Chalmers	5th Mississippi: Col Albert E. Fant; 7th Mississippi: Ltc Hamilton Mayson; 9th Mississippi: Ltc William A. Rankin (mw), Maj F. Eugene Whitfield; 10th Mississippi: Col Robert A. Smith; 52nd Tennessee: Col Benjamin J. Lea; Alabama Battery: Cpt Charles P. Gage
Second Division; BG Jones M. Withers	3rd Brigade BG John K. Jackson	17th Alabama: Ltc Robert C. Fariss; 18th Alabama: Col Eli S. Shorter; 19th Alabama: Col Joseph Wheeler; 2nd Texas: Col John C. Moore, Ltc William P. Rogers, Maj Hall G. Runnels; Georgia Battery: Cpt Isadore P. Girardey

=== Third Army Corps ===
MG William J. Hardee (w)

Brigades	Regiments and batteries
1st Brigade BG Thomas C. Hindman; Col Robert G. Shaver	2nd Arkansas: Col Daniel C. Govan, Maj Reuben F. Harvey; 6th Arkansas: Col Alexander T. Hawthorn (w); 7th Arkansas: Ltc John M. Dean (k), Maj James T. Martin; 3rd Confederate: Col John S. Marmaduke; Mississippi Battery: Cpt Charles Swett
2nd Brigade BG Patrick Cleburne	15th Arkansas: Ltc Archibald K. Patton (k); 6th Mississippi: Col John J. Thornton (w), Maj Robert Lowry (w), Cpt W. A. Harper; 2nd (Bate's) Tennessee: Col William B. Bate (w), Ltc David L. Goodall; 35th (5th Provisional) Tennessee: Col Benjamin J. Hill; 23rd Tennessee: Ltc James F. Neill (w); 24th Tennessee: Ltc Thomas H. Peebles; Trigg's Arkansas Battery: Cpt John T. Trigg; Helena (Arkansas) Artillery: Cpt John H. Calvert
3rd Brigade BG Sterling A. M. Wood (w); Col William K. Patterson	16th Alabama: Ltc John W. Harris; 8th Arkansas: Col William K. Patterson; 9th Arkansas Infantry Battalion: Maj John H. Kelly; 3rd Mississippi Battalion: Maj Aaron B. Hardcastle; 27th Tennessee: Col Christopher H. Williams (k), Ltc Blackburn H. Brown (w), Maj Samuel T. Love (mw); 44th Tennessee: Col Coleman A. McDaniel; 55th (McKoin's) Tennessee: Col James L. McKoin; Mississippi Battery: Cpt William L. Harper (w), Lt Putnam Darden; Georgia Dragoons (company): Cpt Isaac W. Avery

=== Reserve Corps ===
BG John C. Breckinridge

Brigades	Regiments and batteries
1st Brigade Col Robert P. Trabue	4th Alabama Battalion: Maj James M. Clifton; 31st Alabama: Ltc Montgomery Gilbreath; 3rd Kentucky: Ltc Benjamin Anderson (w); 4th Kentucky: Ltc Andrew R. Hynes (w); 5th Kentucky: Col Thomas H. Hunt; 6th Kentucky: Col Joseph H. Lewis; Tennessee Battalion: Ltc James M. Crews; Kentucky Battery: Cpt Edward P. Byrne; Kentucky Battery: Cpt Robert Cobb; Kentucky Cavalry (squadron): Cpt John H. Morgan
2nd Brigade BG John S. Bowen (w); Col John D. Martin	9th Arkansas: Col Isaac L. Dunlop; 10th Arkansas: Col Thomas D. Merrick; 2nd Confederate: Col John D. Martin, Maj Thomas H. Mangum; 1st Missouri: Col Lucius L. Rich (mw); Mississippi Battery: Cpt Alfred Hudson
3rd Brigade Col Walter S. Statham	15th Mississippi: Maj William F. Brantley (w), Cpt Lamkin S. Terry; 22nd Mississippi: Col Frank Schaller (w), Ltc Charles S. Nelms (mw), Maj James S. Prestidge; 19th Tennessee: Col David H. Cummings; 20th Tennessee: Col Joel A. Battle (w&c), Ltc Moscow B. Carter; 28th Tennessee: Col John P. Murray; 45th Tennessee: Ltc Ephraim F. Lytle; Tennessee Battery: Cpt Arthur M. Rutledge

=== Unattached ===
Brigades	Regiments and batteries
Cavalry	Tennessee Regiment: Col Nathan B. Forrest (w); Alabama Regiment: Col James H. Clanton; Texas Regiment: Col John A. Wharton (w)
Artillery	Jackson (Arkansas) Light Artillery: Cpt George T. Hubbard; Tennessee Battery: Cpt Hugh L. W. McClung
