= 21st Illinois Infantry Regiment =

Military unit 1861–1865, once led by Ulysses Grant

21st Regiment Illinois Volunteer Infantry
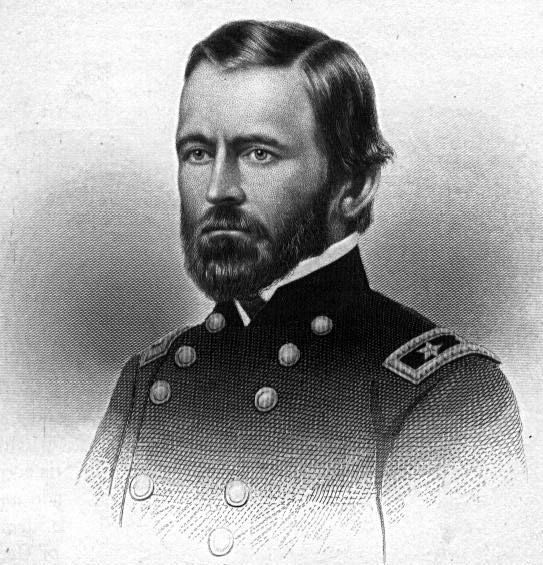
- Ulysses Grant
- Active: June 28, 1861–December 16, 1865
- Country: United States
- Allegiance: Union
- Branch: Infantry
- Engagements: Siege of Corinth; Battle of Perryville; Battle of Stones River; Tullahoma Campaign; Battle of Chickamauga; Battle of Kennesaw Mountain; Battle of Peachtree Creek; Battle of Jonesboro; Battle of Franklin; Battle of Nashville

Commanders
- Notable commanders: Ulysses S. Grant

The 21st Regiment Illinois Volunteer Infantry was a volunteer infantry regiment that served in the Union Army during the American Civil War.

== History ==
The regiment was raised under the Ten Regiment Bill, which anticipated Federal troop requirements by providing for an infantry regiment recruited from each Congressional district in addition to one from the entire state. After its companies rendezvoused at Mattoon on May 9, 1861, the regiment was mustered into state service for a 30-day term by Captain Ulysses S. Grant on May 15. It was known as the Seventh Congressional District Regiment in state service after the district it was organized in. Company A was composed of men recruited in Macon County, Company B in Cumberland County, C in Piatt County, D in Douglas County, E in Moultrie County, F in Edgar County, G in Clay County, H in Clark County, I in Crawford County, and K in Jasper County.

The regiment was mustered into Federal service for a term of three years as the 21st Illinois Infantry on June 28, 1861, with Grant as its colonel. It was ordered to move to Ironton, Missouri, on July 3, but instead operated on the line of the Hannibal and St. Joseph Railroad until August. Grant was promoted to brigadier general and became commander of the District of Southeast Missouri on 7 August, being replaced by regimental lieutenant colonel John W.S. Alexander. Reaching Ironton on 9 August, the regiment was attached there to the Department of Missouri. The 21st Illinois participated in operations around the town between 17 and 25 October, including the Engagement at Fredericktown on 21 October. The regiment marched from Ironton to Greenville on January 29, 1862, and between March 3 and 10 moved to Reeve's Station on Black River. As a result of the latter, it was transferred to Steele's Command of the Army of Southeast Missouri, and between March 31 and April 21 moved to Doniphan and thence to Pocahontas, Arkansas. During this period, the regiment fought in the action at Putnam's Ferry on April 1, before marching to Jacksonport between April 30 and May 4. It then went to Cape Girardeau, Missouri between May 10 and 21 and Hamburg Landing between May 21 and 24, transferring to the 2nd Brigade of the 4th Division of the Army of the Mississippi during the month.

With the brigade, the regiment fought in the Siege of Corinth, Mississippi between May 26 and 30, then in the pursuit to Booneville between May 31 and June 12. It marched to Jacinto and Ripley between June 29 and July 4, and remained at Corinth until August 14. On the latter date, it began a march through Alabama to Nashville, Tennessee and Louisville, Kentucky in pursuit of the Confederate Army of Tennessee that lasted until September 26. The regiment became part of the 31st Brigade of the 9th Division of the Army of the Ohio in September, with the division becoming part of the 3rd Army Corps of the army in October. The regiment fought in the pursuit of the Army of Tennessee into Kentucky during the Confederate Heartland Offensive between October 1 and 16, including the Battle of Perryville on October 8 and the action at Stanford on October 14.

After the Confederate retreat from Kentucky, the 21st Illinois marched to Nashville between October 16 and November 9, remaining there until late December. The regiment became part of the 2nd Brigade of the 1st Division of the Right Wing of XIV Corps of the Army of the Cumberland in November. It participated in the advance on Murfreesboro between December 26 and 30, fighting in the skirmish at Knob Gap on December 26 and the Battle of Stones River on December 30 and 31 and from January 1 to 3, 1863. In January the regiment, with the 2nd Brigade and 1st Division, became part of the XX Corps of the Army of the Cumberland. The 21st Illinois remained at Murfreesboro until June, participating in the reconnaissance from Murfreesboro between March 6 and 7, including the skirmish at the Methodist Church on Shelbyville Pike, and the reconnaissance to Versailles between March 9 and 14.

Nineveh S. McKeen of Company H was awarded the Medal of Honor for his actions at the Battle of Stones River and the Battle of Liberty Gap.

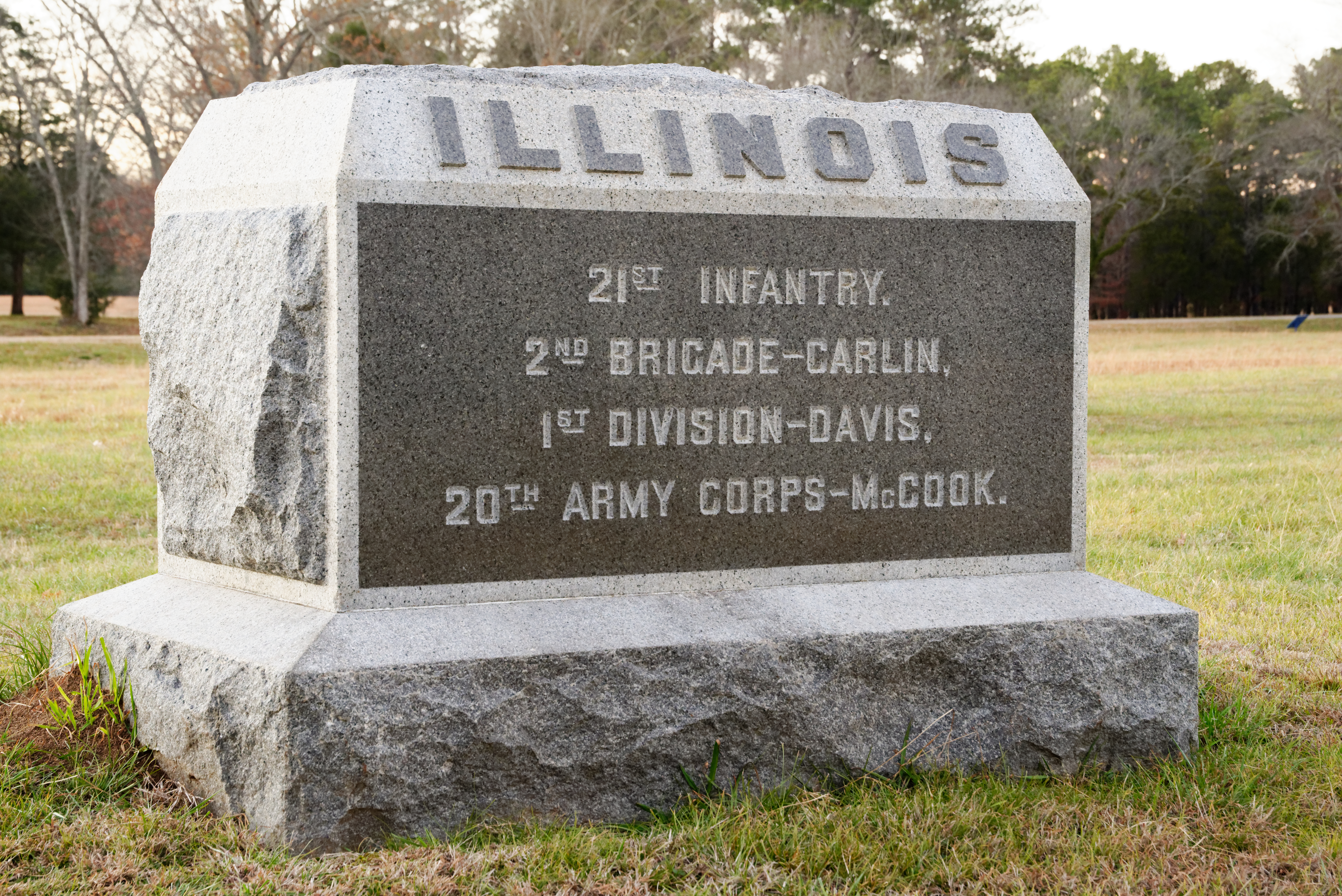
21st Illinois monument in the Viniard Field

During the Battle of Chickamauga, by 2:00 p.m. on 19 September, Carlin placed the 21st Illinois in reserve 100 yards behind the 81st Indiana, which held positions in the eastern part of the Viniard Field. As Carlin was about to begin the brigade advance, division commander Jefferson C. Davis detached the 21st Illinois to support Hans Heg's brigade, although Major James Calloway of the regiment was sent by Carlin to take command of the 81st Indiana. When attacked by Benning's Georgia Brigade while attempting to return to its former positions, the regiment precipitately retreated, losing its colors when its color sergeant was killed holding them. The colors were later retrieved by an officer of the 58th Indiana after a Union counterattack retook the east Viniard Field.

The regiment was mustered out of Federal service at San Antonio on December 16, 1865. Its men were sent to Camp Butler, Illinois, where they were discharged on January 18, 1866.

During its service, the regiment lost six officers and 124 enlisted men killed or mortally wounded, in addition to two officers and 140 enlisted men to disease, for a total of 272 dead.

== Commanders ==
- Colonel Ulysses S. Grant - promoted brigadier general on August 7, 1861.
- Colonel John W.S. Alexander - killed in action September 20, 1863.

== See also ==
- List of Illinois Civil War Units
- Illinois in the American Civil War
