= Camp Trousdale =

Confederate training site during the American Civil War

- Sumner County, Tennessee

Site history
- Built: 1861
- In use: June through November, 1861

Garrison information
- Occupants: Confederate States of America

Camp Trousdale, in Portland, Sumner County, Tennessee, was an early staging and training area for Tennessee Confederate units during the American Civil War, used from June through November 1861. A number of units of the Confederate Army of Tennessee trained in the camp before it was abandoned under pressure from the Union invasion of central Tennessee.

== Training camp ==
Camp Trousdale was a convenient site for training soldiers. The area had previously served as a station on the Louisville & Nashville Railroad. and was located in relatively close proximity to a major city, Nashville, Tennessee. It also had a temperate climate and was close to large open fields which were convenient for the training of volunteers who would later serve in the Army of Tennessee. Camp Trousdale and similar sites such as Camp Moore in Louisiana were often the places where raw volunteers received their first training in military drills, in the form of intense daily practice.

Trousdale also served as a staging area for the military campaigns along the Tennessee-Kentucky border. Felix Zollicoffer, who was appointed commander of Camp Trousdale in July, 1861, used units from the camp to strengthen Confederate defenses near the Cumberland Gap. This campaign led to Zollicoffer's death when he mistakenly crossed into Union lines during a battle near Mill Springs, Kentucky in which the Confederate troops were pushed back into Tennessee.

As with many military camps during the war, disease was a common problem. One of the units that used the camp early in its existence was the Third Tennessee Infantry Regiment. The regiment was moved to the camp in hopes that a change of venue would relieve an epidemic of measles and other diseases that had beset its soldiers. However, even after its move to the camp on July 16, 1861, the soldiers of the Third Tennessee suffered from a variety of illnesses. This prompted the construction of a military hospital, although the hospital was located in a tent rather than a more permanent building. Archaeologists have speculated that the hospital site may provide modern researchers with a variety of artifacts related to the military, medicine, burials, and domestic life.

Despite the vagaries of training, disease, and what one soldier described as "mighty tight rools" (sic), the occupants of Camp Trousdale found time for recreation. One Tennessee soldier wrote that dances were a nightly event at the camp.

The camp was abandoned in November 1861 due to the Union invasion of middle Tennessee.

== Confederate Units in training ==
The following Tennessee Confederate Units trained at Camp Trousdale:

- 3rd Infantry - Colonel John C. Brown
- 7th Infantry - Colonel Robert H. Hatton
- 8th Infantry - Colonel Albert Fulton
- 16th Infantry - Colonel John H. Savage
- 17th Infantry - Colonel Tasewell W. Newman
- 18th Infantry - Colonel Joseph B. Palmer
- 20th Infantry - Colonel Joel A. Battle
- 23rd Infantry - Colonel Mathis Martin
- 24th Infantry - Colonel Robert D. Allison
- 32nd Infantry - Colonel Edmund E. Cook
- 35th Infantry - Colonel Benjamin J. Hill
- 41st Infantry - Colonel Robert Farquharson
- 44th Infantry - Colonel Coleman A. McDaniel
- 45th Infantry - Colonel Addison Mitchell
- 55th (McKoin's) Infantry - Colonel James A. McKoin
- 2nd Cavalry - Colonel E. S. Smith
- 2nd Cavalry Battalion - Lieutenant Colonel Samuel Jones
- 1st Artillery Battery - Captain Arthur M. Rutledge
- Morton's Light Artillery - Company - Captain John W. Morton
- Woodwards Cavalry Company - Captain Thomas C. Woodward
