= Nineveh S. McKeen =

United States Army Medal of Honor recipient

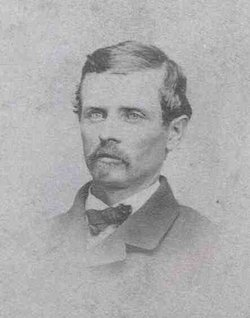
- Born: c. 1837; Marshall, Illinois, US
- Died: December 22, 1890; Collinsville, Illinois, US
- Burial place: Glenwood Cemetery, Collinsville, Illinois
- Military career
- Allegiance: United States; Union
- Branch: United States Army; Union Army
- Service years: 1861-1864
- Rank: First lieutenant Brevet major
- Units: Company H, 21st Illinois Infantry Regiment
- Conflicts: American Civil War
- Awards: Medal of Honor

Nineveh Shaw McKeen (c. 1837 – December 22, 1890) was a Union soldier who fought in the American Civil War and received the Medal of Honor.

== Biography ==
McKeen entered into Union service in Marshall, Illinois and was commissioned as a first lieutenant on June 14, 1861 in Company H of the 21st Illinois Volunteer Infantry. He served as a part of the Army of the Cumberland, which was commanded by General William S. Rosecrans. During the Battle of Stones River, on December 30, 1862, McKeen was noted for his charge into the enemy where he was wounded three times. He served in the Tullahoma Campaign where he fought in the Battle of Liberty Gap. During the battle, McKeen captured the colors of the 8th Arkansas Infantry Regiment. He resigned his commission on July 2, 1864. Due to his service, McKeen received brevet promotions of captain and major of volunteers. He received the Medal of Honor for his actions at Stones River and Liberty Gap on June 23, 1890. He would die a few months later on December 22, 1890 and was buried in Glenwood Cemetery in Collinsville, Illinois.

== Medal of Honor citation ==
Citation:

Conspicuous in the charge at Stone River, Tenn., where he was three times wounded. At Liberty Gap, Tenn., captured colors of 8th Arkansas Infantry (C.S.A.).

== See also ==
- List of Medal of Honor recipients
- List of American Civil War Medal of Honor recipients
- List of American Civil War Medal of Honor recipients: M–P
