= Isaac H. Carmin =

American Civil War Medal of Honor recipient

Isaac H. Carman
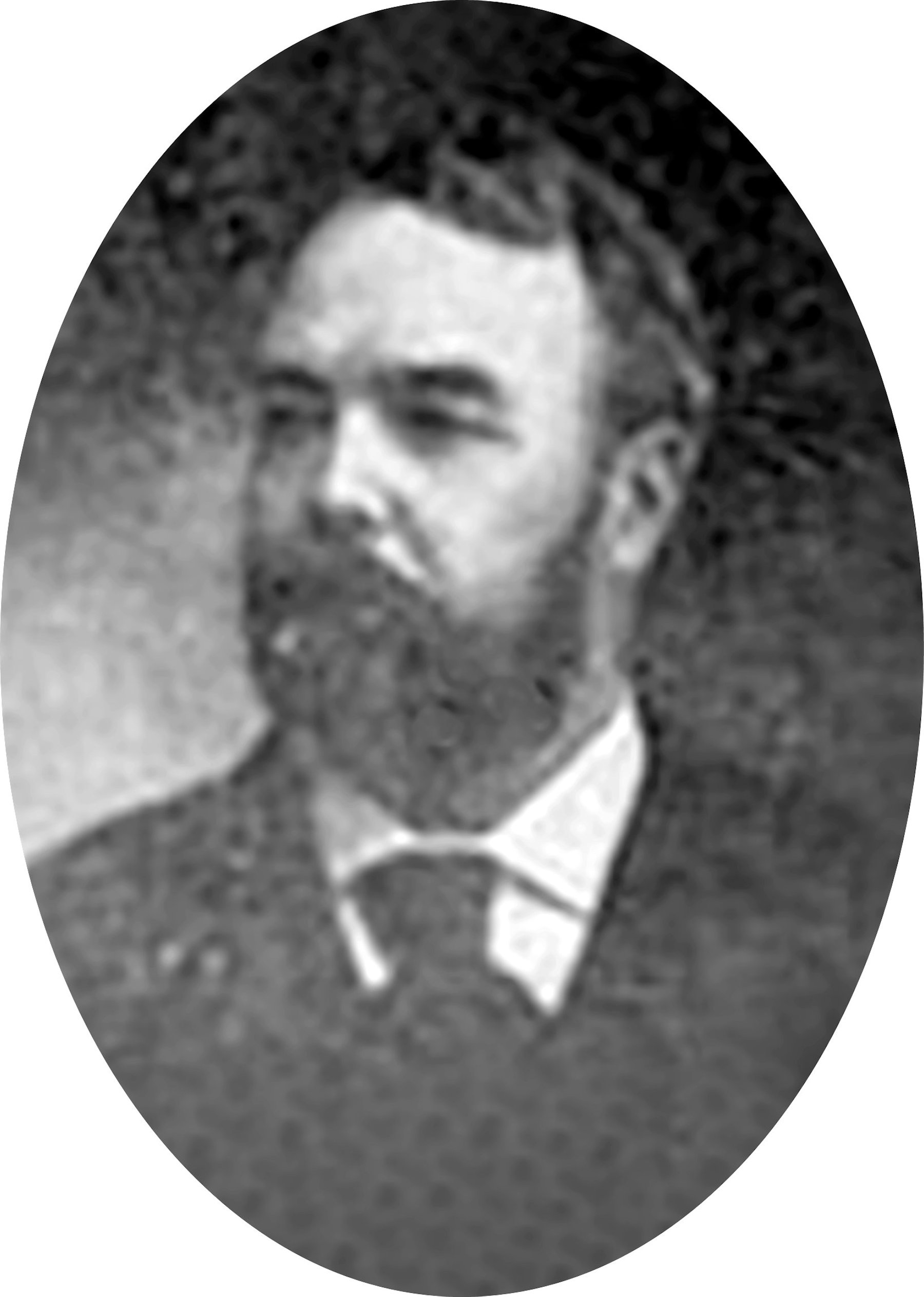
- Carman in 1880
- Born: November 17, 1841; Monmouth County, New Jersey
- Died: June 3, 1919 (aged 77); Washington Court House, Ohio
- Military career
- Allegiance: United States of America
- Branch: United States Army
- Service years: 1861 - 1864
- Rank: Corporal
- Unit: 48th Regiment Ohio Volunteer Infantry - Company A
- Conflicts: Battle of Vicksburg
- Awards: Medal of Honor

Corporal Isaac Harrison Carman (November 17, 1841 to June 3, 1919) was an American soldier who fought in the American Civil War. Carman received the country's highest award for bravery during combat, the Medal of Honor, for his action during the Battle of Vicksburg in Mississippi on 22 May 1863. He was honored with the award on 25 February 1895. Poorly kept records by the United States Government incorrectly spell his name as Carmin / Carmen.

== Biography ==
Carman was born on 17 November 1841 in Monmouth County, New Jersey. He joined the 48th Ohio Infantry in September 1861. He was promoted to corporal on 1 May 1863 and by 22 May he performed the act of gallantry that earned him the Medal of Honor. On that day his company was part of a general assault on a fort during the second major assault in the Battle of Vicksburg. Carman was serving as color guard and, though severely wounded in the leg by a bayonet, prevented the capture of the colors by the Confederate forces.

Carman was involved in other battles including at "Shiloh, Holly Springs, Corinth, Chickasaw Bluffs, Post [of] Arkansas, Port Gibson [and] Champion Hills". He also served a period of detached service aboard the Gunboat Chillicothe between 23 January 1863 and 18 April 1863. He was captured at the Battle of Mansfield, and was a prisoner of War at Camp Ford in Tyler, Texas from 8 April 1864 until his exchange on 3 November 1864. He mustered out of service on 1 December 1864.

Carman died on 3 June 1919.

== Medal of Honor citation ==
Saved his regimental flag; also seized and threw a shell, with burning fuse, from among his comrades.

== See also ==
- List of American Civil War Medal of Honor recipients: A–F
