= Adolph Engelmann =

American farmer, lawyer, and veteran

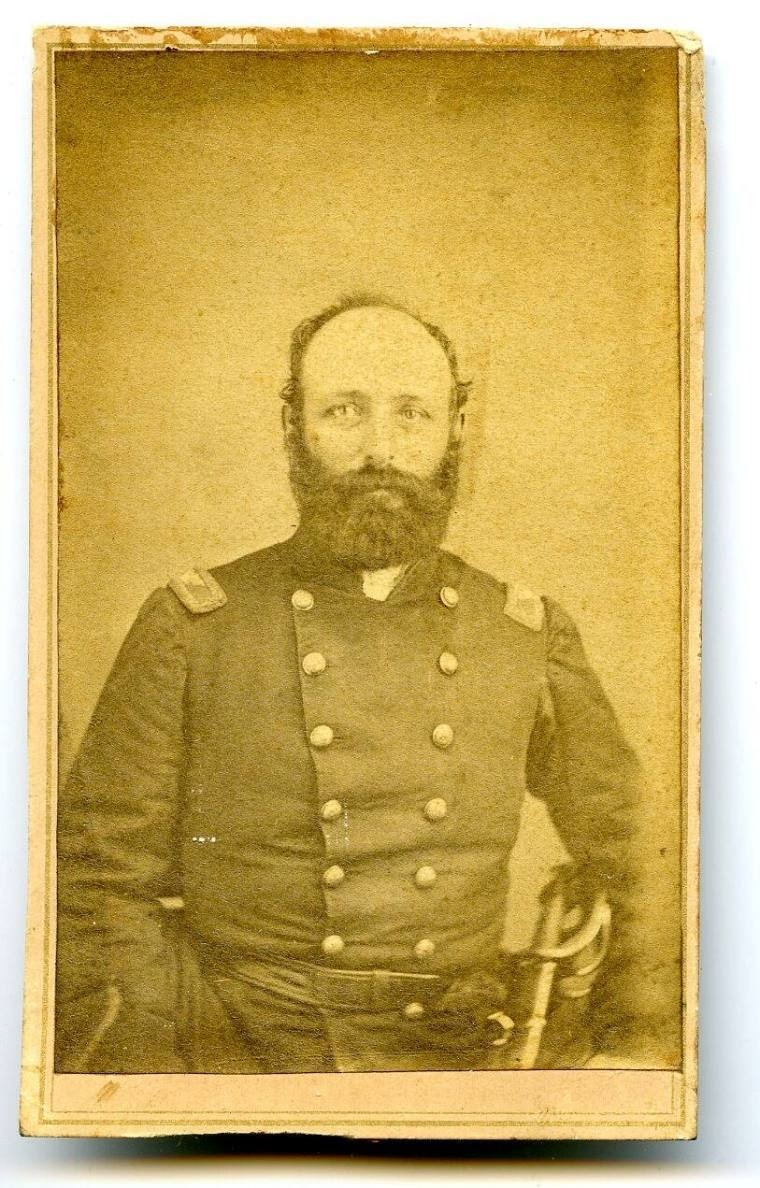
- Engelmann c. 1860's
- Born: February 11, 1825; Imsbach, Kingdom of Bavaria
- Died: October 5, 1890 (aged 65); Shiloh, Illinois, U.S.
- Burial place: Engelmann Cemetery; Shiloh, Illinois, U.S.
- Military career
- Allegiance: German Confederation; United States
- Branch: Schleswig-Holstein Army; Union Army
- Service years: 1861–1865
- Rank: Colonel; Brevet Brigadier General
- Units: 2nd Regiment of Illinois Volunteers; 43rd Illinois Infantry Regiment
- Commands: 43rd Illinois Infantry Regiment; 1st Brigade, Kimball's Division, XVI Corps; 2nd Brigade, 2nd Division, VII Corps
- Conflicts: Mexican–American War; First Schleswig War; American Civil War
- Other work: Farmer, lawyer, postmaster

Adolph Engelmann (February 11, 1825 – October 5, 1890) was a farmer, lawyer, postmaster, Mexican–American War veteran, and Union Army Colonel during the American Civil War. On May 18, 1866, the United States Senate confirmed his appointment as brevet Brigadier General of volunteers.

== Biography ==
Engelmann was born in Imsbach, then in the Kingdom of Bavaria, on February 11, 1825. His family immigrated to the United States in 1831. He served as a second lieutenant in the 2nd Regiment of Illinois Volunteers (12 months) during the Mexican–American War. He was wounded at the Battle of Buena Vista in February 1847. After becoming a Chicago lawyer, Engelmann briefly served in the provisional army of the duchies of Schleswig and Holstein during the First Schleswig War.

On December 16, 1861, Engelmann was commissioned a lieutenant colonel of the 43rd Illinois Volunteer Infantry Regiment. He participated with his regiment in garrisoning Fort Donelson after its capture by the Union Army under Brigadier General Ulysses S. Grant. As commander of the regiment, he fought at the Battle of Shiloh. He was promoted to colonel of the regiment on April 12, 1862. Engelmann succeeded Colonel Julius Raith, his company captain in the Mexican–American War, who was mortally wounded while commanding the brigade which included his 43rd Illinois Infantry Regiment at the Battle of Shiloh.

While still colonel of the 43rd Illinois Infantry Regiment, Engelmann commanded brigades, and briefly divisions, during the remainder of his term or service. From May 28, 1863, to August 10, 1863, including the Siege of Vicksburg, Engelmann commanded the 1st Brigade, Kimball's Division, XVI Corps, Army of the Tennessee. He commanded the 2nd Division of the same corps, then in the Army of Arkansas, from September 6, 1863, to September 31, 1863, before resuming command of his brigade in that division. He participated in the capture of Little Rock, Arkansas. On January 6, 1864, the Army of Arkansas became the Department of Arkansas. Engelmann took command of the 2nd Brigade, 2nd Division, VII Corps. He commanded two other brigades in the 3rd and 1st divisions of the VII Corps during most of the remainder of 1863. He commanded the 1st Division of the VII Corps between September 9, 1864, and September 25, 1864. During this time, he participated in the Camden Expedition, a subsidiary action of the Red River Campaign.

Engelmann was mustered out of the United States Volunteers on December 16, 1864.

On May 18, 1866, the U.S. Senate confirmed Engelmann's appointment to the grade of brevet brigadier general of volunteers, to rank from March 13, 1865, for faithful and meritorious services. The sources do not have the date of his nomination by President Andrew Johnson.

Adolph Engelmann died on October 5, 1890, at Shiloh, Illinois. Engelmann was buried in the Engelmann Family Cemetery at Shiloh, Illinois.

== See also ==
- List of American Civil War brevet generals (Union)
