= 44th Tennessee Infantry Regiment =

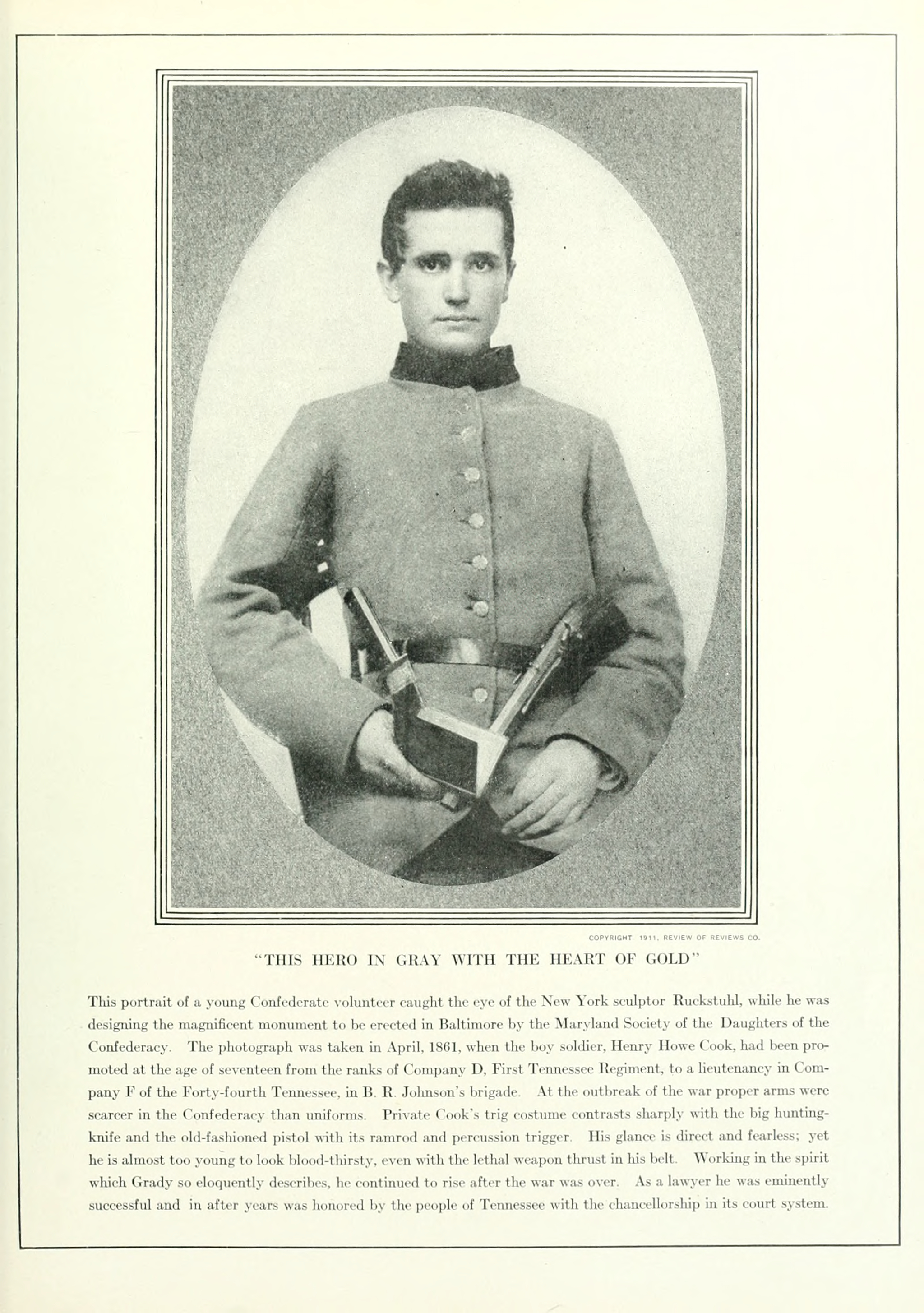
Henry Howe Cook in April 1861 was promoted age 17 from ranks of Company D, 1st Tennessee Infantry to Lt in Company F, 44th Tennessee Infantry

The 44th Regiment, Tennessee Infantry was an infantry regiment from Tennessee that served with the Confederate States Army in the American Civil War.

The regiment was organized in December 1861, in Camp Trousdale. It fought in the Battle of Shiloh, Chickamauga, Mumfordville, Perryville, Stones River and Drewry's Bluff. From November 1863 until the end of the war, it was consolidated with the 22nd Tennessee Infantry Regiment.

== See also ==
- List of Tennessee Confederate Civil War units
