= 17th Louisiana Infantry Regiment =

Infantry regiment of the Confederate States Army

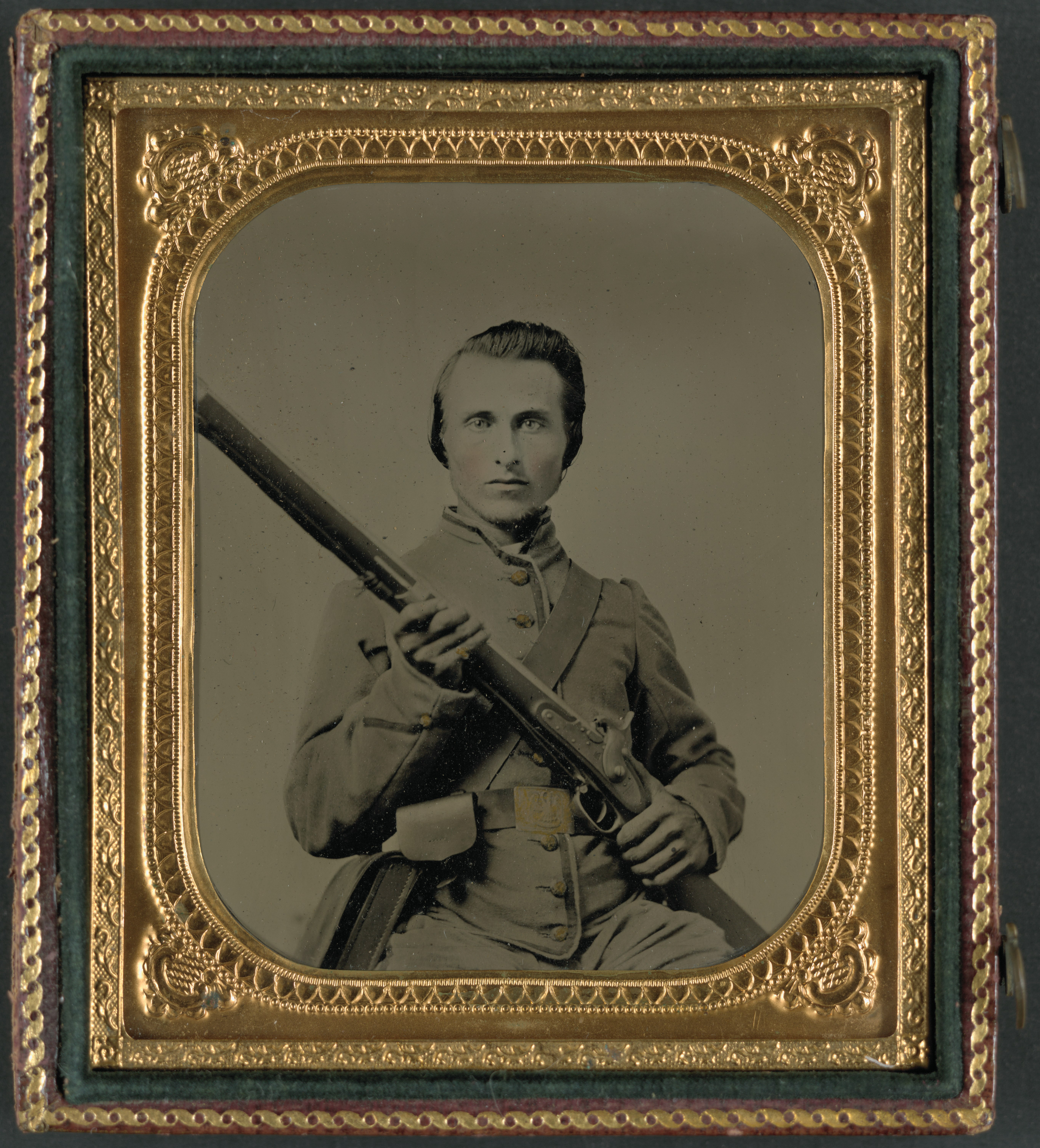
- Unidentified soldier wears Confederate uniform and Louisiana state seal belt buckle.
- Active: 29 September 1861 – 19 May 1865
- Country: Confederate States of America
- Allegiance: Louisiana
- Branch: Confederate States Army
- Type: Infantry
- Size: Regiment (832 men, Sept. 1861)
- Part of: Anderson's and Baldwin's Brigades
- Engagements: American Civil War; Battle of Shiloh (1862); Battle of Chickasaw Bayou (1862); Battle of Port Gibson (1862); Siege of Vicksburg (1863)

Commanders
- Notable commanders: Robert Richardson

The 17th Louisiana Infantry Regiment was a unit of volunteers recruited in Louisiana that fought in the Confederate States Army during the American Civil War. The regiment formed at Camp Moore in September 1861 and served during the war in the Western Theater of the American Civil War. The unit stayed in New Orleans until February 1862 and then moved north to Corinth, Mississippi. The regiment first saw action at Shiloh in April 1862 while serving in Patton Anderson's brigade. Afterwards, the regiment redeployed to the Vicksburg area and repelled Sherman's attack at Chickasaw Bayou that December. In 1863 the regiment took part in the Vicksburg campaign, first fighting at Port Gibson and then at the Siege of Vicksburg in William Baldwin's brigade. On July 4, 1863, the regiment was surrendered along with all other Confederate soldiers at Vicksburg. The soldiers were paroled and went home. The regiment reported to a parole camp at Shreveport, Louisiana, in January 1864. The regiment was on garrison duty in western Louisiana for the remainder of the war, before disbanding in May 1865.

== See also ==
- List of Louisiana Confederate Civil War units
- Louisiana in the Civil War
