= 9th Indiana Infantry Regiment =

9th Regiment Indiana Volunteer Infantry
- Active: April 22, 1861, to September 28, 1865
- Country: United States
- Allegiance: Union Army
- Branch: Infantry
- Engagements: Battle of Cheat Mountain; Battle of Shiloh; Battle of Perryville; Battle of Stones River; Battle of Chickamauga; Battle of Lookout Mountain; Battle of Missionary Ridge; Battle of Kennesaw Mountain; Siege of Atlanta

Commanders
- Colonel of the Regiment: Robert H. Milroy; Gideon C. Moody; Isaac C.B. Suman; William H. Blake

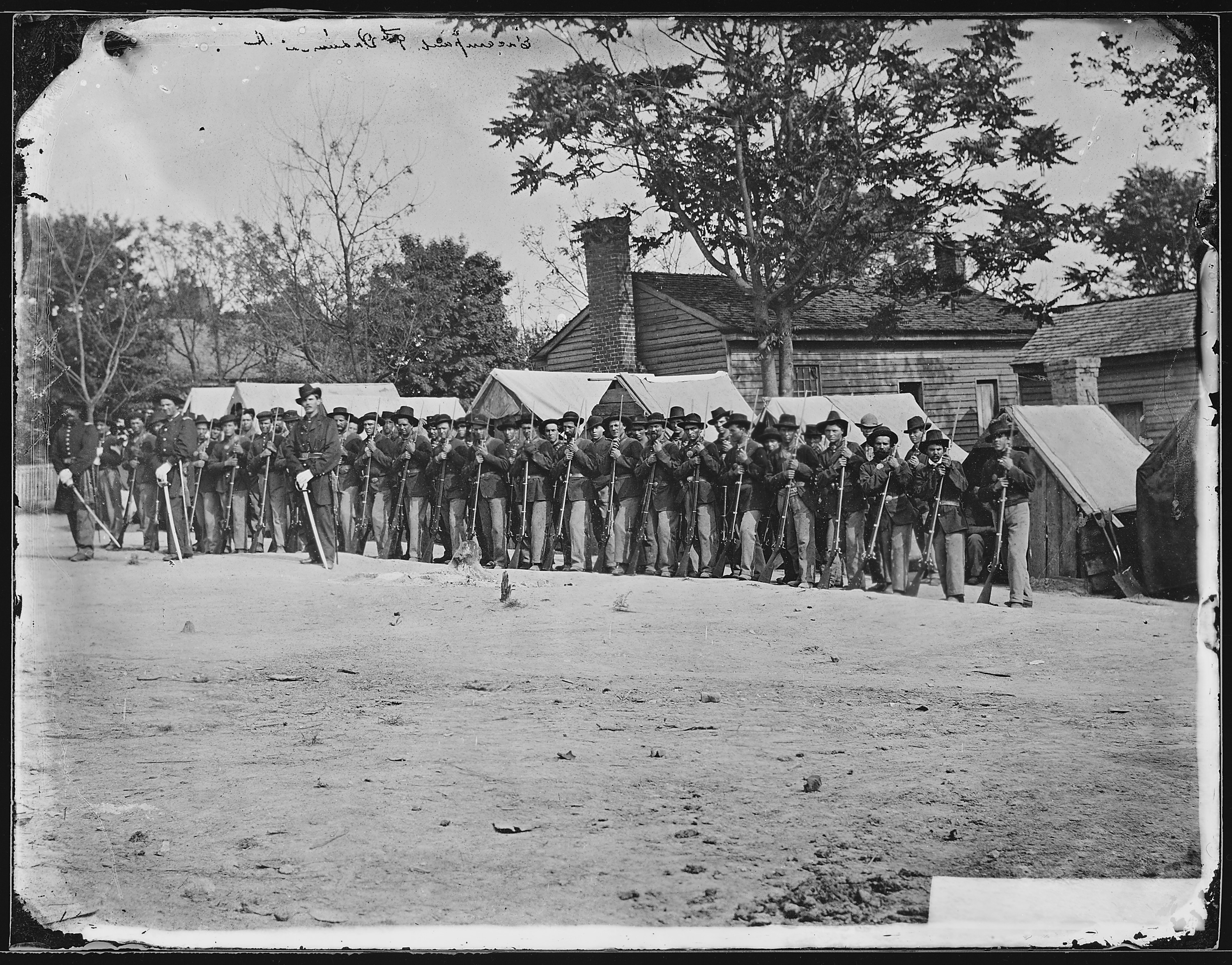
Company A, Indiana Volunteer Infantry. National Archives and Records Administration.

The 9th Indiana Volunteer Infantry Regiment was a volunteer infantry regiment in the Union Army during the American Civil War. It was organized on April 22, 1861, for three-months' service in Indianapolis. After being reorganized for three years' service in late August and early September 1861, the 9th took part in many major battles, including Shiloh, Stones River, Chickamauga, Lookout Mountain, Missionary Ridge, Kennesaw Mountain and the Siege of Atlanta.

The 9th was mustered out on September 28, 1865, after duty at San Antonio and New Braunfels, Texas.

== Personnel ==
Governor Oliver Hazard Perry Morton appointed Robert H. Milroy as colonel of the 9th on April 26, 1861, nearly two weeks after the firing began at the Battle of Fort Sumter. (Note: See appointment letter at collection.)

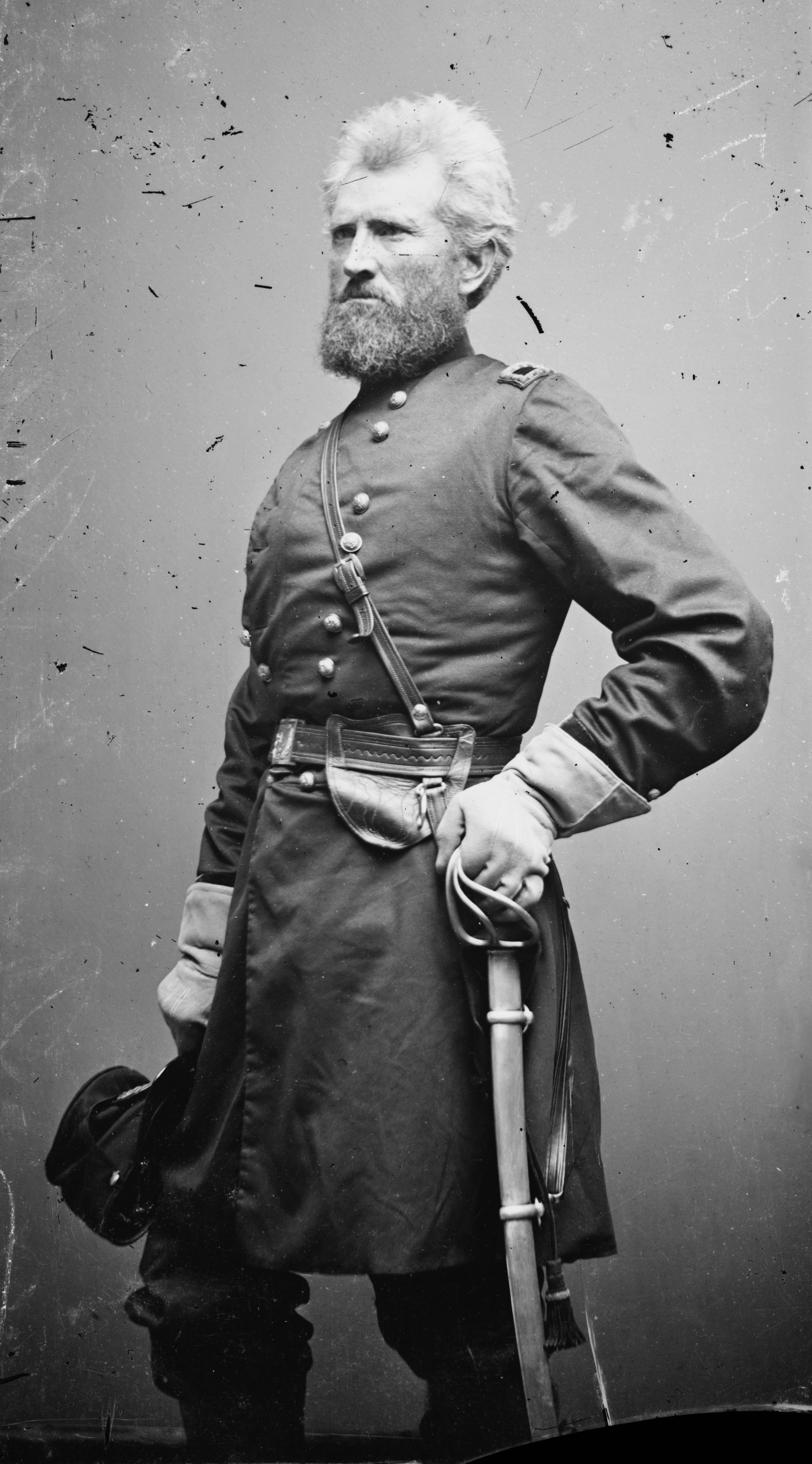
Robert H. Milroy after his promotion to Brigadier General

By September 3, 1861, Milroy had become a brigadier general. He continued to command troops in West Virginia (as Commander of the Cheat Mountain District) into 1862. (Note: See also details at Robert H. Milroy asticle.)

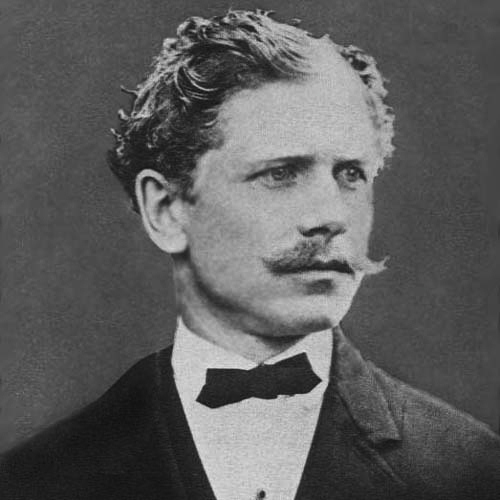
An officer of the 9th Indiana Infantry Lt Ambrose Bierce [about 1866]

By the time the 9th was assigned to William B. Hazen's 19th Brigade of Buell's Army of the Ohio in March 1862, Colonel Gideon C. Moody, a former prosecutor and politician, commanded the regiment. Hazen called Moody "a most gallant officer".

Isaac C.B. Suman, initially the captain of Company H, then became colonel of the 9th. He commanded the 9th during such major battles as Chickamauga.

William H. Blake, initially a major, later became colonel of the 9th. Dudley H. Chase served as a captain in Company K of the 9th in the three-month regiment. William P. Lasselle began as a sergeant in Company K in the three-month regiment and finished as a lieutenant colonel in the three-year regiment. James Nutt of Company I began as a first sergeant and ended as a captain of the three-year regiment. Photographs of some of these officers and a number of other officers and enlisted men from the 9th can be found at Indiana Civil War Soldiers, 9th Infantry,CITEREFCWI,_9th_Infantry_(2001) (Note: The NPS System confirms most of the names listed at as being from the 9th, but we lack confirmation that those pictured are indeed the named soldiers.)

=== Service records ===
The NPS System includes 816 troop records (three-month) and 2916 troop records (three-year) classified as 9th Regiment, Indiana Infantry. These are not complete listings, and they include a number of apparent duplicates (due to alternate name spellings), but the listings do consist of many useful records. For example, author Ambrose Bierce's record of service in the three-year regiment is as follows:

No.	Last, First	Company	Rank_In	Rank_Out
195	Bierce, Ambrose G.	C	Sergeant	First Lieutenant

Other sources such as the Bierce biography by Roy Morris , or at least the sources Morris relied on, confirm the accuracy of this particular record.

Other kinds of service documentation that exist include muster rolls, identification discs, and discharge papers. In the case of the 9th, George Bickel's documentation is representative. Bickel served in Company C of the three-month regiment and, for a short period, in the three-year regiment before he received a medical discharge. Photos of his identification disc, images of the other documentation such as his three-year regiment service papers and a narrative of Bickel's service are available at .

=== Death records ===
Records of some 9th's troops who died during the war can be found at national cemeteries in states where the 9th served, such as Grafton and Shiloh National Cemeteries.

==== Grafton National Cemetery ====
According to the available records, 19 soldiers from the 9th are buried at the Grafton National Cemetery, West Virginia. All of these men were killed in action in what is now West Virginia between the fall of 1861 and the winter of 1861–1862. (Note: A listing of the buried at Grafton appears at the Louisiana State University Civil War Center site at http://www.cwc.lsu.edu/cwc/projects/dbases/ncgrafton.htm)

Name	Rank	Date of death	Company	Name	Rank	Date of death	Company
Abbott, J.A. (Note: J.A. Abbott is incorrectly listed as from the 8th Indiana, when he was from the 9th, Company C, according to Bierce. The record is corrected here. Date of death in the existing record for this J.A. Abbott, along with place of burial, is consistent with Bierce's recollection.)	Private	October 3, 1861	C	Baldwin, William	Private	November 5, 1861	G
Bloomer, John M.	Private	December 21, 1861	G	Boyd, Robert F.	Corporal	November 6, 1861	I
Bunnell, Nathaniel F.	Private	November 3, 1861	N/A	Clark, Thomas M.	Private	January 30, 1862	D
Cotton, William S.	Private	January 30, 1862	F	Cushman, James	Private	November 5, 1862	D
Earl, George	Private	October 31, 1861	B	George, Gustavus	Private	November 16, 1861	E
Gillman, Francis M.	Private	December 10, 1861	I	John, Henry C.	Private	January 28, 1862	D
Pratt, Henry	Private	February 2, 1862	E	Prew, Allick	Private	November 7, 1861	F
Rhear, John	Private	November 21, 1861	F	Robey, James N.	Private	January 21, 1862	F
Snurr, John D.	Private	February 9, 1862	E	Waterman, Josiah C.	Private	January 24, 1862	F
Williams, John	Private	January 29, 1862	B				

==== Shiloh National Cemetery ====
There are 22 dead buried in Shiloh National Cemetery at Pittsburg Landing, Tennessee, identified as soldiers from the 9th Indiana Infantry, according to the cemetery's records.

Name	Rank	Company	Name	Rank	Company
Bear, William S	Private	E	Berlin, Jacob	Private	C
Bolton, R.	Private	B	Cathcart, Wm. H.	Private	K
Dolph, Joseph O.	Private	F	Folsom, Alfred E.	Private	E
Green, George F.	Private	G	Guild, C.L.	Corporal	G
Hadley, Uriah	Private	N/A	Hitecle, J.	Private	H
Houghton, James	Captain	I	Lathrop, Robert R.	Private	E
Miller, Jesse	Corporal	I	Mitchell, James	Private	H
Ormsby, Martin P.	Corporal	C	Patton, Thomas J.	Captain	N/A
Redding, J.F.	Private	G	Stretch, William M.	Private	G
Tantlinger, John S.	1st Sergeant	A	Thatcher, David	Private	H
Thomas, W.M.	Private	G	Ungry, Daniel B.	Private	I

==== Stones River Hazen Brigade Monument ====
The west face of the Hazen Brigade Monument indicates that Capt. Isaac M. Pettit and 2nd Lt. Henry Kessler were among those from the 9th killed at the Battle of Stones River on December 31, 1862. 113 men from the 9th were killed or wounded in the battle. Capt. A. Johnson of the 9th and a detail of officers selected the location of the monument on a crest located between the railroad and the Nashville Pike. Lt. Edward Crebbin of the 9th supervised the detachment that constructed the monument in 1863.

== Engagements ==
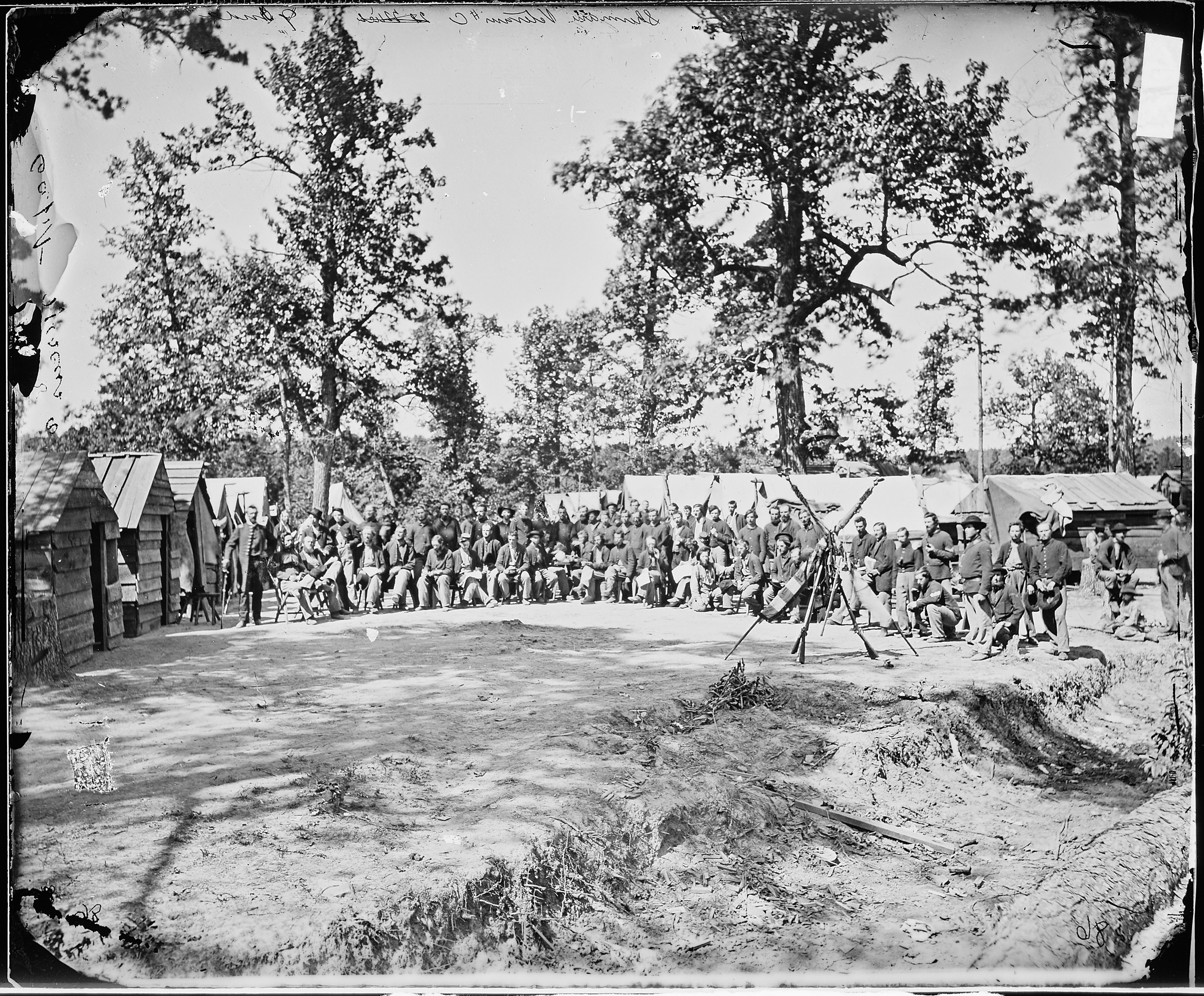
9th Infantry

Soldiers from the 9th Indiana Infantry were among the first troops of Major General George B. McClellan's Department of the Ohio to enter western Virginia in the spring of 1861. As the first Indiana regiment to depart, the 9th was reviewed by Governor Morton and General McClellan and then departed for Grafton, Virginia (now Grafton, West Virginia), via railroad at midnight on May 29, 1861. Crowds in central Ohio cheered for the troops as the train passed.

=== Battle of Philippi ===
June 3, 1861. After some skirmishes at Grafton, one of the first land battles of the Civil War, the Battle of Philippi, took place in Philippi, Barbour County, in what is now West Virginia. (Note: See Battle of Fairfax Court House (June 1861) for an article on a small battle which occurred in Fairfax County, Virginia, between the Virginia (Confederate) Warrenton Rifles militia company and a company of the 2d U.S. Cavalry Regiment on June 1, 1861, two days before the Battle of Philippi.) The battle began when a Federal battery started lobbing shells into a camp of around 825 and surprised Confederate recruits who had been asleep. In response, the Confederates ran, thus earning the battle the name "Philippi Races." After the battle, the 9th camped on the same hill where the battery was located.

Ambrose Bierce mentioned being at Philippi Races. He had enlisted as a private in Company C. Years later, in 1903, Bierce revisited the town. He recalled that visit and the battle in a 1904 piece written for the Eighth Annual Reunion of the 9th Indiana, noting that the Union battery involved "did nothing worse than take off a young Confederate's leg."

=== Battle of Laurel Mountain ===
July 7–11, 1861. The Battle of Laurel Mountain, also known as Laurel Hill, pitted 3,500 forces under Union Brigadier General Thomas A. Morris against what Morris perceived to be superior forces of 4,000 under Confederate Brigadier General Robert S. Garnett. McClellan had ordered Morris to occupy Garnett while McClellan's own force of 5,000 attacked 1,300 men under Lt. Col. John Pegram at Rich Mountain.

As part of Morris' brigade, the 9th Indiana, taking cover behind trees, exchanged fire with Confederates, who were behind breastworks. Tiring of the stalemate that ensued, the Union troops charged the breastworks and did "well enough, considering the hopeless folly of the movement," according to Ambrose Bierce. After Corporal Dyson Boothroyd of the 9th's Company A was wounded in the neck and paralyzed during the charge, Bierce carried Boothroyd "fully 20 rods" (100 m) under enemy fire to safety, only to see him die later, according to an Indianapolis Journal reporter's account. Garnett and his forces retreated to the Cheat River, 10 miles to the northeast. The 9th along with the rest of Morris' brigade (including the Seventh Indiana and the 14th Ohio) pursued Garnett to Corrick's Ford.

=== Battle of Corrick's Ford ===
July 12–14, 1861. Heavy rains complicated Garnett's retreat, resulting in a wagon train becoming mired in the mud at Corrick's Ford, located east of Philippi near St. George (now St. George, West Virginia). By July 13, 1861, the bulk of Garnett's troops had moved north of Job's Ford, near Parsons on the Cheat River. During their retreat, they had crossed the river numerous times to evade the Union forces. To ensure the escape of most of his forces, Garnett ordered the 23rd Virginia Infantry to make a stand in a laurel thicket on the east side of Shaver's Fork at Corrick's Ford. He stayed with this regiment and used the wagon train in the mud as a decoy. This planned ambush ultimately failed. Morris' brigade successfully attacked and displaced the 23rd, and a member of the Seventh Indiana managed to shoot Garnett in the spine, killing him.

=== Battle of Cheat Mountain ===
September 12–16, 1861. Morris asserts that the 9th was in Elkwater on September 12 and was not engaged during Lee's attack, but another source states that a column of Lee's attacked Elkwater on or about September 12, and that the Unionists drove them off with no difficulty. Bierce didn't mention this attack in any of his surviving writings.

=== Battle of Greenbrier River ===
October 3–4, 1861. Bierce did mention the fighting at Greenbrier River, which he called a "reconnaissance in force." A Union force of 5,000 under Joseph J. Reynolds exchanged artillery fire with a Confederate force of 2,000 under H.R. Jackson remaining at Camp Bartow to guard the Staunton-Parkersburg Pike. The Confederates succeeded in defending the road because their artillery was well placed, protected and effective. During a 1903 visit to the site, Bierce noted Union graves, most of which had been opened, with the bodies relocated to the National Cemetery at Grafton. He observed that some graves had been apparently overlooked. There were also between 80 and 100 graves behind the Confederate earthworks that were neglected.

One of the bodies initially buried at Greenbrier River was that of J.A. Abbott of Bierce's company. After a 1909 visit to the area, Bierce recounted the manner of Abbott's death, although he did not personally witness it: "He was lying flat upon his stomach and was killed by being struck in the side by a nearly spent cannon-shot that came rolling in among us. The shot remained in him until removed. It was a solid round-shot, apparently cast in some private foundry, whose proprietor, setting the laws of thrift above those of ballistics, had put his 'imprint' upon it; upon it: it bore, in slightly sunken letters, the name 'Abbott.'"

=== Battle of Camp Allegheny ===
December 13, 1861. The 9th formed part of a brigade under their old regimental commander, now Brigadier General Robert H. Milroy, that attacked Col. Edward Johnson's forces protecting the Staunton-Parkersburg Pike. They exchanged fire for a good portion of that morning, and the Confederates managed to force a Union retreat back to the Cheat Mountain camps.

The 9th participated in building the Union fortification at the summit of Cheat Mountain during the winter of 1861, according to Bierce, who said the following after a visit in 1909: "Here we slew the forest and builded us giant habitations (astride the road from Nowhere to the southeast) commodious to lodge and army and fitly loopholed for discomfiture of the adversary. The long logs that it was our pride to cut and carry! The accuracy with which we laid them one upon another, hewn to the line and bulletproof. The Cyclopean doors that we hung, with sliding blots fit to be the 'mast of some great admiral!' And when we had 'made the pile complete' some marplot of the Regular Army came that way and chatted a few moments with our commander, and we made an earthwork away off on one side of the road (leaving the other side to take care of itself) and camped outside it in tents! But the Regular Army fellow had not the heart to suggest the demolition of our Towers of Babel, and the foundations remain to this day."CITEREFNPS,_Camp_Alleghany_(2003)

=== Battle of Shiloh ===
April 6–7, 1862. The Department of the Ohio was converted to the Army of the Ohio in March 1862. Don Carlos Buell led this Army until he was relieved of command after the Battle of Perryville in October 1862. The Shiloh Union order of battle indicates that the 9th was a part of William "Bull" Nelson's Fourth Division and William B. Hazen's 19th Brigade after the conversion.

Three of Buell's divisions—Nelson's, Thomas L. Crittenden's and Alexander M. McCook's—arrived on the evening of April 6 to reinforce Ulysses S. Grant's Army of West Tennessee, which happened to be located on the west bank of the Tennessee River at Pittsburg Landing, Tennessee, during the battle. Under fire, two small steamers ferried Buell's 30,000 troops across the Tennessee to Pittsburg Landing.

Bierce described what the 9th saw of Pittsburg Landing that evening in vivid detail in "What I Saw of Shiloh." After an exhausting march from the village of Savannah, Tennessee, through swamps and jungle to the banks of the Tennessee opposite the landing, the 9th waited to be ferried across to the western side. Once on a steamer riding precariously low in the water under the weight of the troops, the 9th had a closer view of two Union gunboats, the Lexington and the Tyler. These gunboats had taken advantage of the high river bank and the opportune location of the mouth of a bayou to lob shells at the enemy from a protected vantage point on the river, effectively silencing Confederate small arms fire as much as a mile away. After debarking, the 9th passed through the chaos and carnage evident from the first day's battle. They pushed past fearful soldiers who were trying to escape by boarding the steamers for the trip back to the east bank. Men with bayonets kept those attempting to flee off the boats, and if not initially successful, subsequently threw them into the water.

During the night of April 6 and the early morning of the 7th, Buell positioned Nelson's division closest to the river of all the troops under his command. By the time daylight came, Buell had directed Nelson to advance toward William J. Hardee's corps. Assuming the enemy had retreated all the way to Corinth, Bierce's platoon at one point advanced up an incline over open ground to strengthen the skirmish line, only to discover that Confederate forces in the woods on the far side had been waiting quietly to open fire upon them. Once they did, "a dozen of my brave fellows tumbled over like tenpins." Bierce's platoon made a retreat back across the field to rejoin the rest of the regiment.

The 9th spent the remainder of the battle positioned behind the Union guns (at first lying face down, trying to avoid being killed by the enemy's own artillery) and countering the flanking movements of several succeeding lines of Confederate infantry, which eventually retreated when Union reinforcements arrived.

=== Siege of Corinth ===
April 29-May 30, 1862

=== Battle of Perryville ===
October 8, 1862

=== Battle of Stones River ===
December 30–31, 1862, and January 1–3, 1863. On December 31, the 9th as part of Hazen's brigade defended the left flank of the Union line at Round Wood, now known as "Hell's Half Acre" because of the intensity of the battle at this location. Hazen's forces were the only part of the original line to hold, despite a number of attacks by Breckenridge's division and reinforcements from Polk's corps. 113 men from the 9th were killed or wounded during this battle.

=== Battle of Chickamauga ===
September 19–20, 1863. Colonel Isaac C.B. Suman's official report described the 9th's activities before and during this battle. Ambrose Bierce, then a 2nd Lieutenant, documents the ferocity and sheer brutality of the battle in his famous short story "Chickamauga".

=== Siege of Chattanooga ===
September 22-November 23, 1863

=== Battle of Lookout Mountain ===
November 23–24, 1863

=== Battle of Missionary Ridge ===
November 25, 1863

=== Battle of Resaca ===
May 14–15, 1864

=== Battle of Kennesaw Mountain ===
June 27, 1864

=== Siege of Atlanta ===
July 22–August 25, 1864

=== Battle of Jonesboro ===
August 31–September 1, 1864

=== Battle of Franklin II ===
November 30, 1864

=== Battle of Nashville ===
December 15–16, 1864

== See also ==
- List of Indiana Civil War regiments
- Indiana in the Civil War

== Sources ==
- Bierce, Ambrose (2002). Duncan, Russell; Klooster, David J. (eds.). Phantoms of a Blood-Stained Period: The Complete Civil War writings of Ambrose Bierce (pdf) (1st ed.). Amherst, MA: University of Massachusetts Press. p. 352. ISBN 978-1-55849-327-8. OCLC 48038609.
- Catton, Bruce (1960). Ketchum, Richard M. (ed.). The American Heritage Picture History of the Civil War (pdf) (1st ed.). New York, NY: American Heritage Publishing Co. p. 630. OCLC 1145773404.
- Cozzens, Peter (1992). This Terrible Sound: The Battle of Chickamauga. Champaign, IL: University of Illinois Press. ISBN 9780252065941. OCLC 53818141.
- Dyer, Frederick Henry (1908). A Compendium of the War of the Rebellion (PDF). Des Moines, IA: Dyer Pub. Co. p. 1121. ASIN B01BUFJ76Q. This article incorporates text from this source, which is in the public domain.
- Federal Publishing Company (1908). Military Affairs and Regimental Histories of New Jersey, Indiana, Illinois and Michigan (PDF). The Union Army: A History of Military Affairs in the Loyal States, 1861–65 – Records of the Regiments in the Union army – Cyclopedia of battles – Memoirs of Commanders and Soldiers. Vol. III. Madison, WI: Federal Publishing Company. pp. 112–113. OCLC 694018100. This article incorporates text from this source, which is in the public domain.
- Hazen, William Babcock (1885). A Narrative of Military Service (pdf). Boston, MA: Ticknor and Co. p. 500. OCLC 1080702.
- Morris, Roy (1995). Ambrose Bierce: Alone in Bad Company (pdf). Crown Publishers. ISBN 978-0-517-59646-3. OCLC 32698310.
- Terrell, William Henry Harrison (1865). Report of the Adjutant General of the State of Indiana (pdf). Indiana Adjutant General Reports. Vol. II. Indianapolis, IN: A.H. Connor State Printer. pp. 57–66. OCLC 558004259. This article incorporates text from this source, which is in the public domain.
- U.S. War Department (1899). Operations in Kentucky, Southwest Virginia, Tennessee, Mississippi, North Alabama, and North Georgia. August 11-October 19, 1863. – Part I Reports. The War of the Rebellion: A Compilation of the Official Records of the Union and Confederate Armies. Vol. XXX-XLII-I. Washington, DC: U.S. Government Printing Office. OCLC 857196196. This article incorporates text from this source, which is in the public domain.
- "Indiana Battle Flag Inventory". Indiana War Memorial. May 4, 2021.
- "9th Infantry". Civil War Indiana. April 21, 2007. Archived from the original on January 27, 2001.
- "The Robert H. Milroy Collection". myjcpl.org. April 21, 2007. Archived from the original on August 11, 2016.
- "Blake, William H." nps.gov.
- "Suman, Isaac C. B." nps.gov.
- "A Hoosier's Civil War Dog Tag". Talking Relics. 2007-09-27. Archived from the original on September 27, 2007.
- "Grafton National Cemetery". The United States Civil War Center. 2000-08-18. Archived from the original on March 4, 2005.
- "Grave Locator". Shiloh National Cemetery. 2000-08-18. Archived from the original on October 29, 2011.
- "The Battle of Rich Mountain: An Overview". Rich Mouintain Battlefield. 2000-05-10. Archived from the original on May 18, 2007.
- "Corrick's Ford Battlefield". Rich Mouintain Battlefield. 2003-03-24. Archived from the original on March 24, 2003.
