= Thielman's Independent Cavalry Battalion =

Thielman's Independent Cavalry Battalion (Illinois)
- Illinois flag
- Active: 1861 to December 25, 1862
- Country: United States
- Allegiance: Union
- Branch: Cavalry

Thielman's Independent Cavalry Battalion (Illinois) was a cavalry battalion that served in the Union Army during the American Civil War.

== Service ==
Thielman's Battalion was amalgamated from Thielman's and Marx's Independent Cavalry Companies at Smithland, Kentucky on December 9, 1861.

The battalion was amalgamated with the 16th Illinois Cavalry as Companies "A" and "B" but did not join the main body of the regiment until January 1864.

== Commanders ==
Major Milo Thielman

== See also ==
- List of Illinois Civil War Units
- Illinois in the American Civil War
