= Calvin D. Venable =

Calvin Davenport Venable
- Born: 1815; Kentucky
- Died: May 1862 (aged 40–41); Versailles, Tennessee
- Spouse: Marcy Kendall
- Military career
- Allegiance: Confederate States
- Branch: Confederate States Army
- Service years: 1861–1862
- Rank: Lieutenant Colonel
- Unit: 5th Tennessee Infantry Regiment
- Conflicts: American Civil War

Calvin Davenport Venable (c. 1815 – December 27, 1862) was a Confederate field officer. Born in 1815 in Kentucky, he served as the clerk of a Henry County, Tennessee court. He was appointed the adjutant of the 5th Tennessee Infantry Regiment on May 20, 1861, and lieutenant colonel on August 8 of that year. He was wounded in action at the Battle of Perryville on October 8, 1862, and relieved of his duties later that year. Venable died in Versailles, Tennessee, on December 27, 1862, of his wounds received at Perryville and of congestive fever.
