= 48th Ohio Infantry Regiment =

- Active: September 1861 to May 9, 1866
- Country: United States
- Allegiance: Union
- Branch: Union Army
- Type: Infantry
- Engagements: Battle of Shiloh; Siege of Corinth; Battle of Chickasaw Bayou; Battle of Arkansas Post; Battle of Port Gibson; Battle of Champion Hill; Siege of Vicksburg; Jackson Expedition; Red River Campaign; Battle of Mansfield; Battle of Fort Blakeley

The 48th Ohio Infantry Regiment was an infantry regiment in the Union Army during the American Civil War.

== Service ==
The 48th Ohio Infantry Regiment was organized at Camp Dennison near Cincinnati, Ohio September through December 1861 and mustered in February 17, 1862, for three years service under the command of Colonel Peter John Sullivan.

The regiment was attached to District of Paducah, Kentucky, to March 1862. 4th Brigade, 5th Division, Army of the Tennessee, to May 1862. 3rd Brigade, 5th Division, Army of the Tennessee, to July 1862. 3rd Brigade, 5th Division, District of Memphis, Tennessee, to November 1862. 3rd Brigade, 5th Division, Right Wing, XIII Corps, Department of the Tennessee, to November 1862. 2nd Brigade, 1st Division, Right Wing, XIII Corps, to December 1862. 2nd Brigade, 1st Division, Sherman's Yazoo Expedition, to January 1863. 2nd Brigade, 10th Division, XIII Corps, Army of the Tennessee, to August 1863. 2nd Brigade, 4th Division, XIII Corps, Department of the Tennessee and Department of the Gulf, to April 1864. Captured at Sabine Cross Roads, La., April 8, 1864. Attached to defenses of New Orleans, Louisiana, Department of the Gulf, November 1864, to January 1865.

The 48th Ohio Infantry was reorganized as the 48th Ohio Infantry Battalion on June 24, 1865, by consolidation of the regiment with the 83rd Ohio Infantry Regiment (on January 17, 1865) and 114th Ohio Infantry Regiment. It mustered out of service at Galveston, Texas, on May 9, 1866.

=== Detailed service ===
The following is its detailed service by year.

==== 1862 ====
Ordered to Paducah, Ky., and duty there until March 6. Moved from Paducah, Ky., to Savannah, Tenn., March 6–10, 1862. Expedition from Savannah to Yellow Creek, Miss., and occupation of Pittsburg Landing, Tenn., March 14–17. Battle of Shiloh, Tenn., April 6–7. Advance on and siege of Corinth, Miss., April 29-May 30. March to Memphis, Tenn., via La-Grange, Grand Junction and Holly Springs June 1-July 21. Near Holly Springs July 1. Duty at Memphis and along Memphis & Charleston Railroad until November. Grant's Central Mississippi Campaign. Operations on the Mississippi Central Railroad. "Tallahatchie March" November 26-December 12. Sherman's Yazoo Expedition December 20, 1862, to January 2, 1863. Chickasaw Bayou December 26–28, 1862. Chickasaw Bluff December 29.

==== 1863 ====
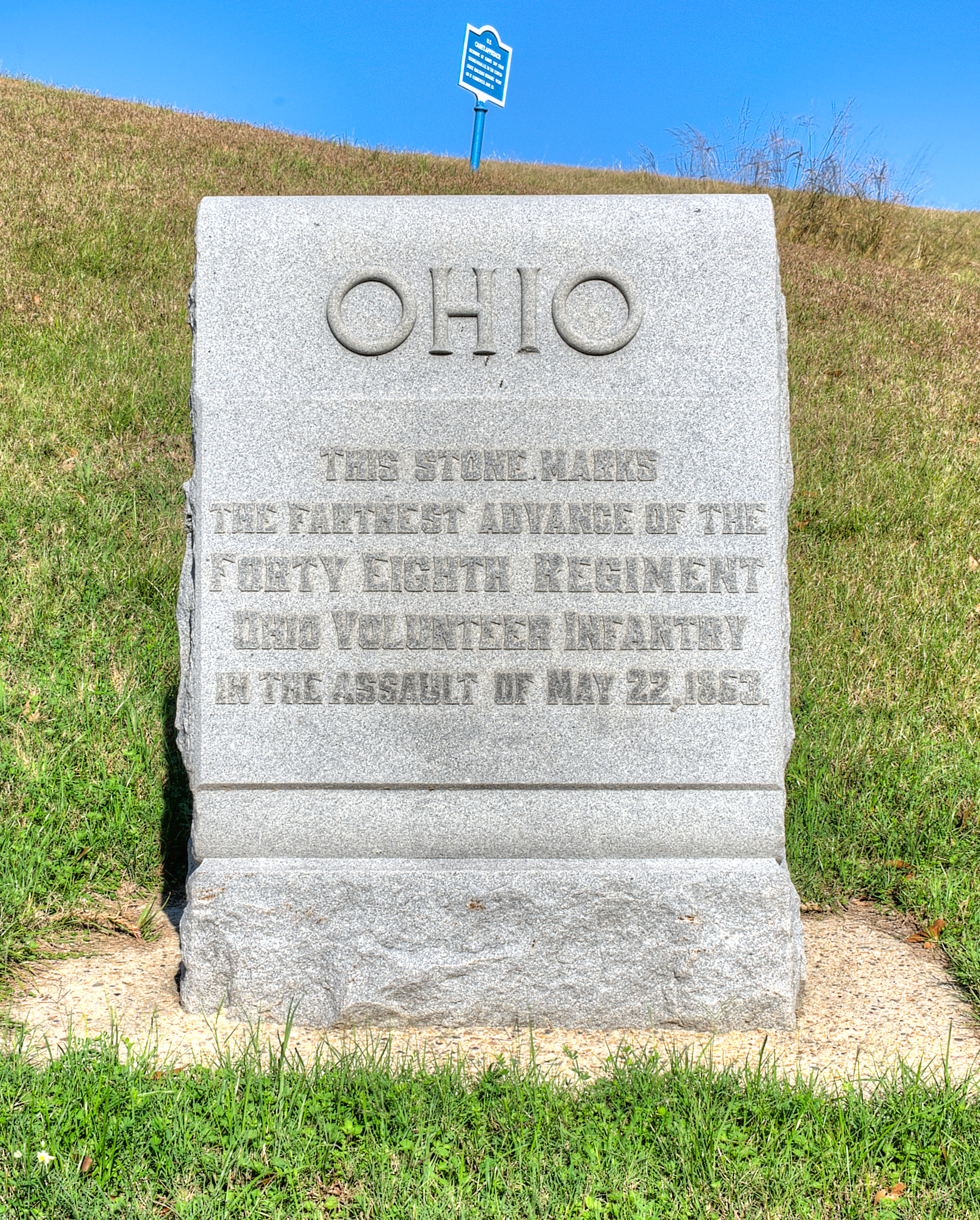
Monument at Vicksburg National Military Park

Expedition to Arkansas Post, Ark., January 3–10, 1863. Assault and capture of Fort Hindman, Arkansas Post, Ark., January 10–11. Moved to Young's Point, La., January 15, and duty there until March 8. At Milliken's Bend, La., until April 25. Movement on Bruinsburg and turning Grand Gulf April 25–30. Battle of Port Gibson May 1. Battle of Champion Hill May 16. Siege of Vicksburg, Miss., May 18-July 4. Assaults on Vicksburg May 19 and 22. Advance on Jackson, Miss., July 4–10. Siege of Jackson July 10–17. Camp at Big Black until August 13. Ordered to New Orleans, La., August 13. Western Louisiana Campaign October 3-November 30. At New Iberia until December 13. Moved to New Orleans, La., December 13; then to Pass Cavallo, Texas, and duty there and at Du Crow's Point until March 1, 1864.

==== 1864 ====
Moved to New Orleans, La., March 1. Red River Campaign March 10 to April 23. Advance from Franklin to Alexandria March 14–26. Bayou De Paul, Carroll's Mill, April 8. Battle of Sabine Cross Roads April 8. Regiment captured and prisoners of war until October 1864, when exchanged. Duty at New Orleans until January 1865.

==== 1865 ====
Moved to Kennersville January 28, then to Barrancas, Fla. March from Pensacola, Fla., to Fort Blakely, Ala., March 20-April 2. Siege of Fort Blakely April 2–9. Assault and capture of Fort Blakely April 9. Occupation of Mobile April 12. March to Montgomery and Selma April 13–21. Duty at Selma until May 12. Moved to Mobile May 12, then to Galveston, Texas, June 13, and duty there until July 24. Duty at Galveston and Houston, Texas, until May 1866.

== Casualties ==
The regiment lost a total of 180 men during service; 3 officers and 54 enlisted men killed or mortally wounded, 3 officers and 120 enlisted men died of disease.

== Commanders ==
- Colonel Peter J. Sullivan
- Lieutenant Colonel Job R. Parker - commanded at the Battle of Shiloh after Sullivan was wounded; also commanded at the Battle of Champion Hill

== Notable members ==
- Corporal Isaac H. Carmin, Company A - Medal of Honor recipient for action at Vicksburg, May 22, 1863
- Second Lieutenant George W. Crowell Jan 23 1865

== See also ==
- List of Ohio Civil War units
- Ohio in the Civil War
