= Stewart's Independent Cavalry Battalion =

Stewart's Independent Cavalry Battalion (Illinois)
- Illinois flag
- Active: 1861 to December 25, 1862
- Country: United States
- Allegiance: Union
- Branch: Cavalry

Stewart's Independent Cavalry Battalion (Illinois) was a cavalry battalion that served in the Union Army during the American Civil War.

== Service ==
Stewart's Battalion was consolidated in July 1862 at Jackson, Tennessee from Stewart's Independent Cavalry Company as Company "A;" Carmichael's Independent Cavalry Company as Company "B;" Dollins' Independent Cavalry Company as Company "C;" O'Harnett's Independent Cavalry Company as Company "D"; Hutchins' Independent Cavalry Company as Company "E."

The battalion was transferred to the 15th Regiment Illinois Volunteer Cavalry on December 25, 1862 as Companies "A," "B," "C," "D," "E" and "F".

== See also ==
- List of Illinois Civil War Units
- Illinois in the American Civil War
