= 6th Kentucky Infantry Regiment (Union) =

- Active: December 24, 1861 - January 2, 1865
- Country: United States
- Allegiance: Union
- Branch: Infantry
- Engagements: Battle of Shiloh; Siege of Corinth; Battle of Perryville; Battle of Stones River; Tullahoma Campaign; Battle of Chickamauga; Siege of Chattanooga; Battle of Missionary Ridge; Atlanta campaign Battle of Resaca; Battle of Kennesaw Mountain; Battle of Peachtree Creek; Siege of Atlanta

The 6th Kentucky Infantry Regiment was an infantry regiment that served in the Union Army during the American Civil War.

== Service ==
The 6th Kentucky Infantry Regiment was organized at Camp Muldraugh's Hill and Shepherdsville, Kentucky and mustered in for a three-year enlistment on December 24, 1861, under the command of Colonel Walter Chiles Whitaker.

The regiment was attached to Rousseau's 1st Brigade, McCook's Command, at Nolin, Kentucky, to November 1861. 12th Brigade, Army of the Ohio, to December 1861. 12th Brigade, 1st Division, Army of the Ohio, to January 1862. 19th Brigade, 4th Division, Army of the Ohio, to September 1862. 19th Brigade, 4th Division, II Corps, Army of the Ohio, to November 1862. 2nd Brigade, 2nd Division, Left Wing, XIV Corps, Army of the Cumberland, to January 1863. 2nd Brigade, 2nd Division, XXI Corps, to October 1863. 2nd Brigade, 3rd Division, IV Corps, to August 1864. 1st Brigade, Defenses of Nashville & Chattanooga Railroad, to September 1864. Unattached, 4th Division, XX Corps, to November 1864. District of Kentucky to January 1865.

The 6th Kentucky Infantry mustered out of service at Louisville, Kentucky, from September 23, 1864, to January 2, 1865.

== Detailed service ==
Engaged in the defense of eastern Kentucky before muster. Moved to Lebanon, Kentucky, November 28, 1861. Skirmish at Bagdad, Selby County, Kentucky, December 12, 1861. At Camp Wyckliffe, Kentucky, until February 1862. Advance on Nashville, Tennessee, February 14–25. Occupation of Nashville February 25-March 18. March to Savannah, Tennessee, March 18-April 6. Battle of Shiloh, April 7. Advance on and siege of Corinth, Mississippi, April 29-May 30. Occupation of Corinth May 30, and pursuit to Booneville May 31-June 12. Buell's Campaign in northern Alabama and middle Tennessee June to August. Flat Lick, Tenn., August 17 (detachment). March to Louisville, Kentucky, in pursuit of Bragg August 17-September 26. Pursuit of Bragg to London, Kentucky, October 1–22. Battle of Perryville, October 8. Danville October 11. Near Crab Orchard October 15. Wild Cat Mountain, near Crab Orchard, and Big Rockcastle River, near Mt. Vernon, October 18. Pittman's Cross Roads October 19. March to Nashville, Tennessee, October 23-November 6, and duty there until December 26. Advance on Murfreesboro, Tennessee, December 26–30. Springfield, Kentucky, December 30 (detachment). Battle of Stones River December 30–31, 1862 and January 1–3, 1863. At Murfreesboro until June. Woodbury January 24. Expedition to Woodbury April 2. Snow Hill, Woodbury, April 3. Tullahoma Campaign June 24-July 7. Liberty Gap June 24–27. Occupation of middle Tennessee until August 16. Passage of Cumberland Mountains and Tennessee River and Chickamauga Campaign August 16-September 22. Lee and Gordon's Mills, Georgia, September 11–13. Battle of Chickamauga, September 19–20. Siege of Chattanooga, Tennessee, September 24-November 23. Reopening Tennessee River October 26–29. Brown's Ferry October 27. Chattanooga-Ringgold Campaign November 23–27. Orchard Knob November 23–24. Missionary Ridge November 25. March to relief of Knoxville November 28-December 8. Operations in eastern Tennessee December 1863 to April 1864. Atlanta Campaign May 1 to August 19, 1864. Demonstrations on Rocky Faced Ridge and Dalton May 8–13. Battle of Resaca May 14–15. Adairsville May 17. Near Kingston May 18–19. Near Cassville May 19. Advance on Dallas May 22–25. Operations on line of Pumpkin Vine Creek and battles about Dallas, New Hope Church, and Allatoona Hills May 25-June 5. Pickett's Mills May 27. Operations about Marietta and against Kennesaw Mountain June 10-July 2. Pine Hill June 11–14. Lost Mountain June 15–17. Assault on Kennesaw June 27. Ruff's Station, Smyrna Camp Ground, July 4. Pace's Ferry July 5. Chattahoochie River July 6–17. Peachtree Creek July 19–20. Siege of Atlanta July 22-August 19. Ordered to Chattanooga, Tennessee, August 19. Garrison duty there and at Bridgeport, Alabama, until November 2. Moved to Nashville, Tennessee, then ordered to Louisville, Kentucky. Mustered out September 23, 1864 to January 2, 1865.

== Casualties ==
The regiment lost a total of 216 men during service; 10 officers and 105 enlisted men killed or mortally wounded, 5 officers and 96 enlisted men died of disease.

== Commanders ==
- Colonel Walter Chiles Whitaker
- Colonel George T. Shackelford - commanded at the battle of Chickamauga
- Lieutenant Colonel Richard Rockingham - commanded at the battle of Chickamauga
- Major Richard T. Whitaker - commanded at the battle of Chickamauga

== See also ==
- List of Kentucky Civil War Units
- Kentucky in the Civil War
