= Independent Illinois Volunteer Cavalry Companies =

- Illinois flag
- Active: 1861 to 1862
- Country: United States
- Allegiance: Union
- Branch: Cavalry

The state of Illinois raised a number of short-lived Independent Cavalry Companies which served in the Union Army during the American Civil War. Most of these units were quickly amalgamated with larger formations.

== Units ==
- Barker's Dragoons was organized at Chicago, Illinois on April 19, 1861. It served at Cairo, Illinois and later West Virginia, serving as George B. McClellan's escort. It participated in the Battle of Rich Mountain and was mustered out in September 1861.
- Carmichael's Independent Cavalry Company was organized at Camp Butler, Illinois as Cavalry Company B of the 29th Illinois Infantry, mustering into service on August 19, 1861. It participated in the operations against Fort Henry and Fort Donelson, and then the Battle of Shiloh. In July 1862 it was assigned as Company B of Stewart's Independent Cavalry Battalion.
- Dollins' Independent Cavalry Company was organized in conjunction with the 31st Illinois Infantry, mustering in on September 18, 1861 at Cairo, Illinois. It participated in the operations against Fort Henry and Fort Donelson, and then the Battle of Shiloh. In July 1862 it was assigned as Company C of Stewart's Independent Cavalry Battalion.
- Ford's Independent Cavalry Company was organized in conjunction with the 53rd Illinois Infantry, mustering in on January 1, 1862 at Ottawa, Illinois. It participated in the Battle of Corinth and was assigned to the 15th Regiment Illinois Volunteer Cavalry as Company "L" on December 25, 1862.
- Gilbert's Independent Cavalry Company was organized in conjunction with the 52nd Illinois Infantry, mustering in on October 25, 1861 at Geneva, Illinois. It participated in the Battles of Corinth and Shiloh and was ultimately assigned to the 15th Regiment Illinois Volunteer Cavalry as Company G on December 25, 1862.
- Hutchins' Independent Cavalry Company was organized in conjunction with the 27th Illinois Infantry, mustering in on October 25. In July 1862 it was assigned as Company E of Stewart's Independent Cavalry Battalion.
- Jenks' Independent Cavalry Company was organized at Aurora, Illinois as Cavalry Company A of the 36th Illinois Infantry, mustering into service on September 23, 1861. It participated in the Battles of Pea Ridge, Iuka, and Corinth. The company was assigned to the 15th Regiment Illinois Volunteer Cavalry as Company I on December 25, 1862.
- Dodson's Kane County Independent Cavalry Company was organized on September 1, 1861. The company was assigned to the 15th Regiment Illinois Volunteer Cavalry as Company H on December 25, 1862.
- Marx's Independent Cavalry Company was organized on December 9, 1861 and was assigned to Thielman's Independent Cavalry Battalion as Company B.
- The McClellan Dragoons were organized at Chicago, Illinois in October 1861. They were assigned to the 12th Regiment Illinois Volunteer Cavalry as Companies H and I in February 1862 but operated independently until February 1863. They served in the Peninsular Campaign and the battles of Antietam, Fredericksburg, and Gettysburg until joining the main body of the regiment at Chicago in November 1863.
- McClernand's Body Guard was organized January 21, 1863 and was subsequently assigned as four companies of the 16th Regiment Illinois Volunteer Cavalry in April 1863.
- Naughton's Irish Dragoons was organized on September 21, 1861 in conjunction with the 23rd Illinois Infantry. The company was assigned to "Curtis Horse," the 5th Regiment Iowa Volunteer Cavalry, as Company L in November 1861.
- O'Harnett's Independent Cavalry Company was organized at Camp Butler, Illinois in conjunction with the 30th Illinois Infantry, mustering into service on September 1, 1861. It participated in the operations against Fort Henry and Fort Donelson, and then the Battle of Shiloh. In July 1862 it was assigned to Stewart's Independent Cavalry Battalion.
- Schambeck's Independent Cavalry Company was organized at Chicago, Illinois on July 8, 1861. The company was assigned to Thielman's Independent Cavalry Battalion as Company C but never operated with the rest of the battalion. It participated in the Battle of Carnifex Ferry and the Battle of Antietam, and spent the rest of its time in service in West Virginia. The company mustered out on July 16, 1864.
- Sherer's Independent Cavalry Company was organized at Aurora, Illinois as Company B, 36th Illinois Infantry, but detached from the regiment and served primarily as headquarters guard. It was assigned to the 15th Illinois Cavalry on December 25, 1862 as Company K and mustered out with that regiment.
- Stewart's Independent Cavalry Company was organized at Cape Girardeau, Missouri on August 10, 1861 on the orders of John C. Fremont. It participated in the operations against Fort Henry and Fort Donelson, and then the Battle of Shiloh. In July 1862 it was assigned to Stewart's Independent Cavalry Battalion.
- Thielman's Independent Cavalry Company was organized at Chicago, Illinois on July 2, 1861, and was assigned to Thielman's Independent Cavalry Battalion as Company A on December 9, 1861.

== See also ==
- List of Illinois Civil War Units
- Illinois in the American Civil War
