= Peter John Sullivan =

American lawyer

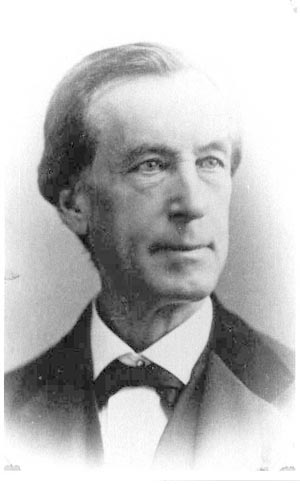
- Born: March 15, 1821; Cork, Ireland
- Died: March 2, 1883 (aged 61); Cincinnati, Ohio, U.S.
- Burial place: Spring Grove Cemetery, Cincinnati, Ohio
- Military career
- Allegiance: United States of America; Union
- Branch: United States Army; Union Army
- Service years: 1861 - 1863
- Rank: Colonel; Brevet Brigadier General
- Commands: 48th Ohio Infantry
- Conflicts: Mexican-American War; American Civil War; Battle of Shiloh (WIA); Siege of Vicksburg

United States Ambassador to Colombia
- In office July 25, 1867 – June 26, 1869
- President: Andrew Johnson
- Preceded by: Allan W. Burton
- Succeeded by: Stephen A. Hurlbut

Peter John Sullivan (March 15, 1821 – March 2, 1883) was an Irish-American soldier and lawyer, who became United States Ambassador to Colombia.

== Life ==
Sullivan was born March 15, 1821, in Cork, Ireland. Sullivan's parents brought him to Philadelphia when he was two years old, and he received his education at the University of Pennsylvania. He served in the Mexican-American War, and received the brevet of major for meritorious services.

After retiring to civil life, he became one of the official stenographers of the U.S. Senate, and in 1848 went to live in Cincinnati, Ohio, where he was admitted to the bar. He was prominent there as an opponent of the Know-nothing movement.

During the American Civil War, Sullivan took an active part in organizing several Ohio volunteer regiments and went to the scene of action as colonel of the 48th Ohio Infantry. He was severely wounded at the Battle of Shiloh. His injuries would force him to resign on August 7, 1863. On December 11, 1866, President Andrew Johnson nominated Sullivan for appointment to the brevet grade of brigadier general of volunteers to rank from March 13, 1865, and the U.S. Senate confirmed the appointment on February 6, 1867.

In 1867, Sullivan was appointed U.S. Minister to Colombia and held that office until 1869. He then returned to the practice of the law.

Sullivan died at Cincinnati on March 2, 1883, and was buried in Spring Grove Cemetery.

== See also ==
- List of American Civil War brevet generals
