= 43rd Illinois Infantry Regiment =

43rd Illinois Volunteer Infantry Regiment
- Illinois state flag
- Active: October 12, 1861, to November 30, 1865
- Country: United States
- Allegiance: Union
- Branch: Infantry
- Nickname: "Koener Regiment"
- Engagements: Battle of Shiloh; Siege of Corinth; Siege of Vicksburg; Battle of Prairie D'Ane; Battle of Jenkins' Ferry

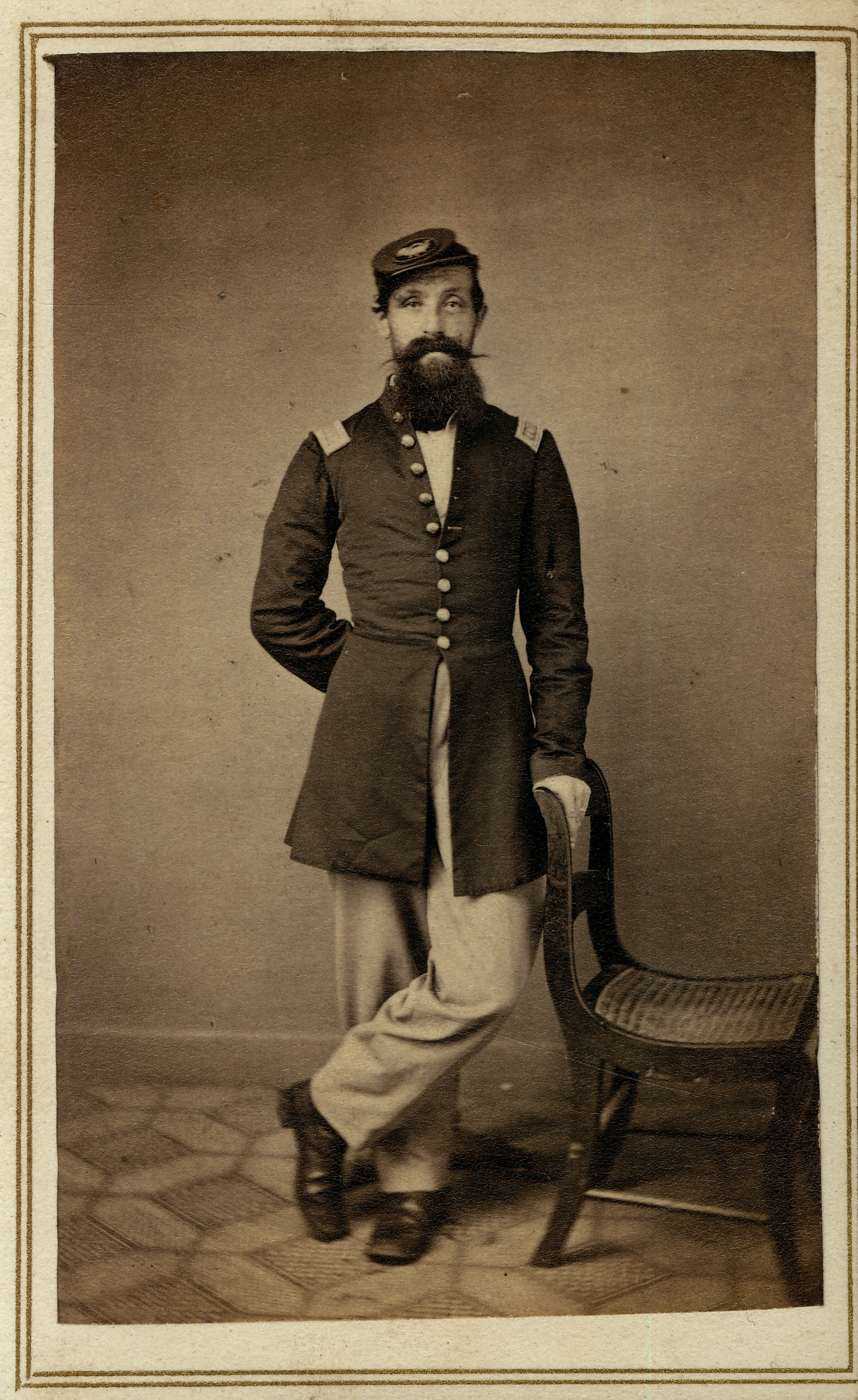
Charles Hoenny, Captain of 43rd Regiment.

The 43rd Illinois Regiment Volunteer Infantry, known as the "Koerner Regiment" after Gustav Körner, was an infantry regiment that served in the Union Army during the American Civil War.

== Service ==
The 43rd Illinois Infantry was organized at Camp Butler, Illinois, and mustered into Federal service on October 12, 1861.

Initially consisting of 8 Companies, they moved to St. Louis, Missouri, where they were issued Harper's Ferry and Pattern 1853 Enfield Rifled Muskets, in early 1862, While Stationed at Benton Barracks, Two Additional Companies were added.

=== Battle of Shiloh ===
In February 1862, the Regiment took part in the Battle of Shiloh. It was assigned to the third brigade of McClernand's Division. On the Morning of April 6, 1862, the Regiment was among the First to respond to the Confederate assault on Shiloh.

The 43rd Fought Stubbornly, supporting Waterhouse's Battery and Suffering Heavy losses. During the Battle, Colonel Julius Raith was mortally wounded and died on April 9, 1862, 1862. After the battle, it lost 206 out of its 500 engaged.

=== Western Tennessee and Mississippi ===
Following the Advance of Corinth, the Regiment Spent much of 1862 performing garrison duty, Building Fortifications at Bolivar, Tennessee, and moving towards Luka and Jackson. In December 1862, a detachment of the regiment, led by Colonel Adolph Engelmann, repelled a charge by Confederate Cavalry at Salem Cemetery near Jackson.

In the Spring of 1863, a 200-Man Detachment of the 43rd Was Mounted Briefly for Scouting operations. The Regiment later participated in the operations of the Vicksburg Campaign along the Yazoo River and at Haine's Bluff.

=== Red River Expedition ===
The 43rd was among the first Union regiments to enter Little Rock on September 11, 1863, following the evacuation of Confederate forces there.

In March 1864, It Took part in the Red River Campaign, where it saw Action at Prairie D'Ane, and then at Jenkins' Ferry, where it faced superior Confederate numbers. During the Fighting, the 43rd captured a Confederate battery and dragged it back to union lines.

The regiment remained on duty at Little Rock through the end of the war. Though many of its original members were discharged in late 1864 upon the expiration of their 3-year enlistments, the regiment was still maintained by drafted recruits. The 43rd Illinois was mustered out on November 30, 1865.

== Total strength and casualties ==
The regiment suffered 8 officers and 75 enlisted men who were killed in action or mortally wounded, and 2 officers and 161 enlisted men who died of disease, for a total of 246 fatalities.

== Armament ==
The 43rd Illinois was initially armed with Model 1822 and Tower muskets converted to percussion cap locks. On Boxing Day, 1861 (December 26) they turned these weapons in and received imported British Pattern 1853 rifles ("3-band") (Note: These were the standard rifle for the British army having performed well in the Crimean War. The Enfield was a .577 calibre Minié-type muzzle-loading rifled musket. It was used by both armies and was the second most widely used infantry weapon in the Union forces.) from the Federalm arsenal in St. Louis. Through its service more imported Enfields and refurbished Springfields were issued. Up to its mustering out the Enfield remained its standard long arm.

== Commanders ==
- Colonel Julius Raith - Mortally wounded at Shiloh, died on April 9, 1862.
- Colonel Adolph Englemann - Mustered out on December 31, 1864.
- Lieutenant Colonel Adolph Dengler - mustered out with the regiment.

== See also ==
- List of Illinois Civil War Units
- Illinois in the American Civil War
