= John Hotaling =

American military officer and engineer (1824–1886)

John Ritter Hotaling (March 3, 1824 – October 12, 1886) was an American soldier, engineer, and businessman. He served as a dragoon in the Mexican–American War and as a cavalry officer and senior staff member of General John Logan's during the American Civil War. After the war, Hotaling was elected postmaster of Rochelle, Illinois; a position he occupied for 15 years, after which he retired and moved his family to Huron. He died there in 1886 of a heart attack.

== Early life and career ==
Hotaling was born in Sharon, New York, the eldest of ten children. His father, Robert (1796–1886), was a farmer and at the age of 15, the younger Hotaling began training in printing. After completing 18 months of his apprenticeship, Hotaling's father allowed his son to move to New York City, where he began working in a printing office. After a year of employment, Hotaling traveled to Europe; visiting Antwerp, Rotterdam, and other European cities, possibly while doing genealogy research. Upon returning to New York, he took work in a wire factory for several years.

On March 20, 1847, Hotaling enlisted in the NY militia as a dragoon, with the intention of serving in the Mexican–American War. Hotaling landed in Veracruz as part of the army that was under the command of General Winfield Scott, and fought his way inland toward Mexico City. During guerrilla action in the Battle for Mexico City, he was severely wounded by a slash to the throat and would have died, were it not for the medical attention of a fellow soldier. On July 21, 1848, Hotaling was discharged due to the end of the war.

In 1849, at the height of the California Gold Rush, Hotaling, now a civilian and veteran, accompanied 60 other men on a trip to California by sea. Their ship proved to be very cumbersome, and they were forced to dock for a period in Brazil, where they were invited guests at the birthday celebration of Brazilian Emperor Pedro II. Eight months after initially setting sail, the group finally arrived in California. Hotaling lived for two years in California, but then returned to New York.

He married Sophia Waterhouse of Brooklyn, and the newlywed couple moved West, settling in Lindenwood, Illinois, where they lived as farmers. In 1852, Hotaling was contracted to build a two-mile stretch of track through Ogle County. In 1855, Hotaling built what was said to be the first brick building in Lane, Illinois (now Rochelle): a three-story office building which also included an elevator.

== Civil War ==
In 1861, at the start of the American Civil War, Hotaling helped raise a company of Union cavalrymen that was recognized by the Army as Co. A, 2nd Illinois Cavalry Regiment. His brother Nick, who had also moved to Ogle County from New York, enlisted and served along with him. Three of Hotaling's other brothers served in Eastern Regiments. Hotaling, newly commissioned as a captain, was one of the commanding officers of Company A. He would also command company B of the same regiment at various times.

Union General Ulysses Grant made frequent use of both companies in battle, considering them very mobile and efficient. Hotaling's skill later caught the eye of Union General Edward Ord, who appointed Hotaling and his men as his personal escort group. Hotaling commanded both companies A & B at the Battle of Fort Donelson. Hotaling and Capt. Larison commanded 126 men in the Battle of Shiloh. On November 19, 1863, Hotaling was promoted to the rank of major. After Ord was wounded, Hotaling and his men served as escort to Union General John A. Logan, who later appointed Hotaling as his personal chief of staff. In the summer of 1864, Major Hotaling served under Logan in the ranks of the XV Corps in the Battle of Atlanta. As a part of the Atlanta force, Hotaling may have taken part in Sherman's March to the Sea; though, since General Logan had temporarily passed command of the XVth to General Oliver Otis Howard after Atlanta, it is not certain. Major Hotaling did serve under General Logan once more in the Carolinas campaign.

Those who served with and under Hotaling regarded him as a born leader, charismatic, intelligent, and friendly. There soon began talk within the higher ranks of promoting Hotaling to the rank of colonel and a command of his own, but Logan so well-liked his adjutant that he would hear nothing of it. Hotaling was repeatedly passed over for promotions and would stay at his rank of major until the end of the war. After the war, during Army reunions, Logan was regularly heard praising Hotaling's bravery and resourcefulness. In 1868, General Charles C. Walcott said of Hotaling: "Our forces owed their success before Atlanta more to him than any other man."

In February 1863, Hotaling received word that his wife, Sophia, had died in Illinois of tuberculosis.

== Postbellum career ==
Hotaling retired from service after the war and returned to Illinois, where he married a 39-year-old widow named Carrie Cass on December 9, 1868. In the fall of 1869, Hotaling was elected postmaster of Rochelle, a position he occupied until 1884. In 1871, Hotaling placed his wife in charge of his local business and ventured to Central America, lured by an opportunity in the railroad business. However, the tropical environment proved too difficult, and he returned to the States after six months. In February 1874, Hotaling traveled to South America with an interest in gold mining; once more, the climate and complex obstacles involved in the trade took their toll, and he returned home after two months. It would be his last known expedition outside the United States.

In the 1880s, after purchasing some land in the Dakota Territory, Hotaling moved to Huron but died of a heart attack in 1886, at the age of 62. His body was returned to Rochelle, where it is buried in the Lawnridge Cemetery. He had two children with his first wife Sophia, and one son with his second wife Carrie.

Samuel Fletcher, who served under Hotaling during the Civil War, eulogized his former commander thusly in his 1912 memoir of that conflict: "He was quiet, modest, sincere and dignified, but always pleasant and approachable. As a soldier, he was earnest, loyal and brave to a degree, and the welfare of his men was his first consideration. He never commanded a soldier to go where he would not lead, and never hesitated to lead because Death stood in the way."
