= Walter C. Whitaker =

Walter Chiles Whitaker
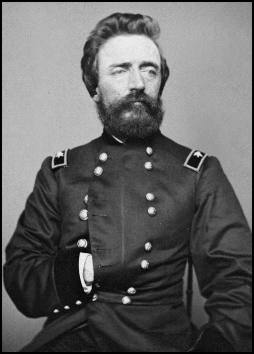
- Walter Chiles Whitaker
- Born: August 8, 1823; Shelbyville, Kentucky, US
- Died: July 9, 1887 (aged 63); Lyndon, Kentucky, US
- Burial place: Grove Hill Cemetery, Shelbyville, Kentucky
- Military career
- Allegiance: United States of America; Union
- Branch: United States Army; Union Army
- Service years: 1847–1848, 1861–1865
- Rank: Brigadier General; Brevet Major General
- Commands: 6th Kentucky Infantry Regiment; 1st Bde, 1st Div, Reserve Corps; 2nd Bde, 1st Div, IV Corps; 1st Div, IV Corps
- Conflicts: Mexican–American War; American Civil War; Battle of Stones River (WIA); Battle of Chickamauga (WIA); Third Battle of Chattanooga; Battle of Resaca; Battle of Franklin; Battle of Nashville

Walter Chiles Whitaker (August 8, 1823 – July 9, 1887) was an American farmer, attorney, and soldier. He served as an officer in the United States Army during the Mexican–American War, and also was a Union general during the American Civil War. After the war, he returned to his profession as an attorney.

== Early life and career ==
Whitaker was born in Shelbyville, Kentucky. He attended Bethany College in modern-day West Virginia. Whitaker was working as a lawyer when the Mexican–American War began. In 1847, Whitaker volunteered for service during the war with Mexico and was commissioned a second lieutenant in the 6th Kentucky Infantry Regiment beginning on October 1. He served until July 21, 1848, when he was mustered out of the volunteers.

After Mexico, Whitaker returned home to Kentucky, where he began running a large farm. He then became a criminal law attorney in Shelbyville. Later, he was elected as a legislator to the Kentucky General Assembly, serving until the American Civil War was well underway. While in the state senate, Whitaker proposed the resolution that set Kentucky on the side of the Union, ending the state's brief period of neutrality in the war.

== Civil War service ==
In late 1861, Whitaker chose to follow the Union cause and re-entered the U.S. Army. He was appointed the colonel of his old regiment, the 6th Kentucky, on December 24. The 6th fought at the Battle of Stones River in 1862, and Whitaker was wounded in his left elbow during the battle's first day on December 31. During the first day of the battle, his regiment defended the Round Forest as part of Col. William B. Hazen's brigade.

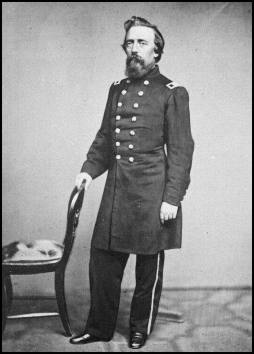
Walter C. Whitaker during the Civil War

On June 25, 1863, Whitaker was promoted to brigadier general, and given brigade command in the Army of the Cumberland that August. He fought at the Union defense at the Battle of Chickamauga that fall as part of Brig. Gen. Gordon Granger's Reserve Corps, and was again wounded, hit in his abdomen on September 20. He continued to serve in the Army of the Cumberland, fighting at Lookout Mountain and Rossville Gap during the Third Battle of Chattanooga on November 23 and was once more wounded in action during the fight. Furthermore, he was reportedly so drunk at Chickamauga that his regimental commanders had to fend for themselves. At Lookout Mountain he was also "deep in his cups" though he was sober enough to order a charge that contributed to the Union success.

Whitaker and his brigade then fought during the Atlanta campaign of 1864. He participated in the inconclusive Battle of Resaca that spring, and received his last Civil War wound there on May 15 when he was injured by the concussion of an artillery shell which exploded nearby. He recovered by that fall and was given divisional command in the Army of the Cumberland beginning on September 19. Whitaker participated in the Battle of Franklin on November 30, 1864, and then at the Battle of Nashville on December 15 and 16, serving under Maj. Gen. George H. Thomas.

On March 13, 1865, Whitaker was appointed a brevet major general for his actions near Atlanta, Georgia, on that date. He was then mustered out of the Union Army on August 24, after the end of the American Civil War.

== Postbellum ==
After leaving the U.S. Army, Whitaker was a lawyer in Louisville, Kentucky, again in criminal cases. He also reportedly drank to excess most of his life, and spent some years in a mental asylum after the war. Whitaker died at the age of 63 in Lyndon, Kentucky, supposedly in full mental health, and was buried in Shelbyville's Grove Hill Cemetery.

== See also ==
- List of American Civil War generals (Union)
