= 22nd Tennessee Infantry Regiment =

Confederate Infantry Regiment from Tennessee

The 22nd Regiment, Tennessee Infantry was an infantry regiment from Tennessee that served with the Confederate States Army in the American Civil War. Notable battles fought in include the Battle of Shiloh.

== See also ==
- List of Tennessee Confederate Civil War units
