= Julius Raith =

Union Army officer

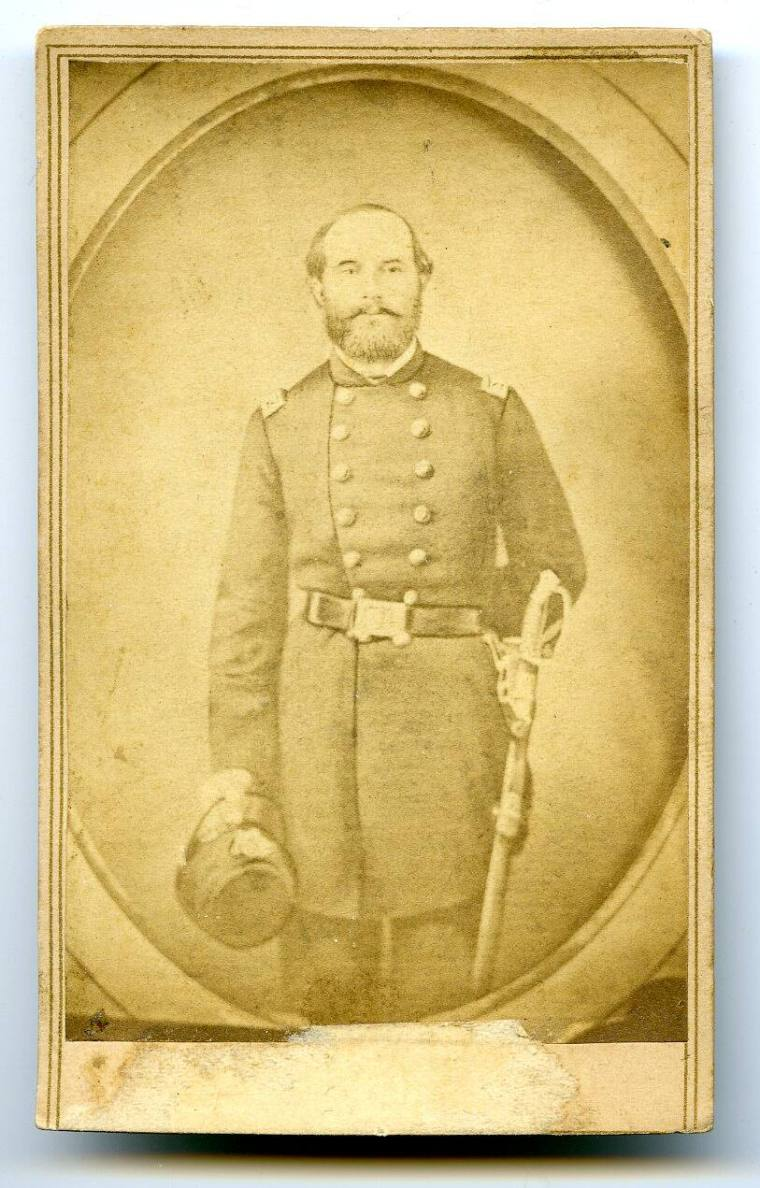
- Raith c. 1861
- Born: March 29, 1819; Göttingen, Kingdom of Hanover, German Confederation
- Died: April 11, 1862 (aged 43); Pittsburg Landing, Tennessee, U.S.
- Cause of death: Tetanus from minié ball wound
- Burial place: Shiloh National Cemetery, Shiloh, Tennessee, U.S.
- Military career
- Allegiance: United States
- Branch: United States Volunteers (1846–1847); Union Army (1861–1862)
- Service years: 1846–1847; 1861–1862
- Rank: Colonel
- Unit: 2nd Illinois Volunteers
- Commands: 43rd Illinois Infantry Regiment
- Conflicts: Mexican-American War; American Civil War; Battle of Shiloh †

Julius Raith (March 29, 1819 – April 11, 1862) was a German-American military officer who served in the American Civil War and the Mexican–American War. He was mortally wounded at the Battle of Shiloh.

== Early life ==
Raith was born on March 29, 1819 in Göttingen, then part of the Kingdom of Hanover in the German Confederation. Raith came to the United States in 1836 with his family, ultimately settling in St. Clair County, Illinois.

While in St. Clair County, Raith worked as a wheelwright in Belleville, Illinois.

== Military service ==
=== Mexican-American War ===
During the Mexican–American War, Raith served as the Captain of Company H of 2nd Illinois Volunteers. The 2nd Illinois Volunteers were organized in Belleville in May 1846 and mustered into service in Alton, Illinois on June 16, 1846 under the command of Colonel William Henry Bissell. During the war the 2nd Illinois Volunteers fought at the Battle of Buena Vista. Raith mustered out of service on June 16, 1847.

=== American Civil War ===
At the outbreak of the American Civil War Raith helped Gustave Koerner organize the 43rd Illinois Infantry Regiment, also known as the "Koerner Regiment", an ethnic German regiment. The 43rd Illinois was organized into service in September 1861 at Camp Butler before being sent to Benton Barracks.

During the Battle of Shiloh, Raith led a brigade in General McClernand's division composed of his own regiment, the 43rd Illinois, along with the 17th Illinois, the 29th Illinois, and the 49th Illinois. The actual commanding officer was Colonel Leonard Fulton Ross, who was absent, leaving Colonel James S. Reardon in charge; however, Reardon was ill. On April 6, 1861 Raith was wounded by a minie ball in the leg above the knee and laid on the battlefield for 24 hours. Raith died of tetanus from his injuries on April 11, 1862 aboard the steamship Hannibal. Raith is buried in Shiloh National Cemetery.

== See also ==
- Latin Settlement
- German Americans in the Civil War
- Battle of Shiloh
