= Versailles, Tennessee =

Unincorporated community in Tennessee, US

Coordinates: 35°43′46″N 86°32′29″W

Versailles is an unincorporated community in Rutherford County, in the U.S. state of Tennessee.

== History ==
A post office called Versailles was established in 1840, and remained in operation until 1906. Besides the post office, the community contained a country store.
