= 71st Illinois Infantry Regiment =

71st Regiment Illinois Volunteer Infantry
- Illinois state flag
- Active: July 26, 1862, to October 29, 1862
- Country: United States
- Allegiance: Union
- Branch: Infantry
- Engagements: None

The 71st Regiment Illinois Volunteer Infantry was an infantry regiment that served in the Union Army during the American Civil War.

== Service ==
The 71st Illinois Infantry was organized at Camp Douglas at Chicago, Illinois and mustered into Federal service on July 26, 1862, for a term of three months. It served garrisons in scattered garrisons in southern Illinois and western Kentucky. Company K unanimously elected James Creed as captain, which was responsible for protecting two bridges along the Big Muddy river in southern Illinois from Confederate sympathizers.

The regiment was mustered out on October 29, 1862.

== Total strength and casualties ==
The regiment suffered 23 enlisted men who died of disease, for a total of 23 fatalities.

== Commanders ==
- Colonel Othniel Gilbert - mustered out with the regiment.

== See also ==
- List of Illinois Civil War Units
- Illinois in the American Civil War
