= Illinois in the American Civil War =

During the American Civil War, the state of Illinois was a major source of troops for the Union Army (particularly for those armies serving in the Western Theater of the Civil War), and of military supplies, food, and clothing. Situated near major rivers and railroads, Illinois became a major jumping-off place early in the war for Ulysses S. Grant's efforts to seize control of the Mississippi and Tennessee rivers. Statewide, public support for the Union was high despite pockets Copperhead sentiment among some antiwar Democrats.

The state was energetically led throughout the war by Governor Richard Yates. Illinois contributed 250,000 soldiers to the Union Army, ranking it fourth in terms of the total manpower in Federal military service. Illinois troops predominantly fought in the Western Theater, although a few regiments played important roles in the East, particularly in the Army of the Potomac. Several thousand Illinoisians were killed or died of their wounds during the war, and a number of national cemeteries were established in Illinois to bury their remains. In addition to President Abraham Lincoln, a number of other Illinois men became prominent in the army or in national politics, including generals, Ulysses S. Grant, John M. Schofield and John A. Logan, Senator Lyman Trumbull, and Representative Elihu P. Washburne. No major battles were fought in the state, although several river towns became sites for important supply depots and "brownwater" navy yards. Several prisoner of war camps and prisons dotted the state after 1863, processing thousands of captive Confederate soldiers.

The war was highly controversial in Southern Illinois—known as "Little Egypt." There was some support for the Confederacy but mostly it was a matter of fierce opposition to Lincoln's war policies. The most dramatic episode came when Congressman John A. Logan switched from opposition to a national leader in support of the war.

== History ==
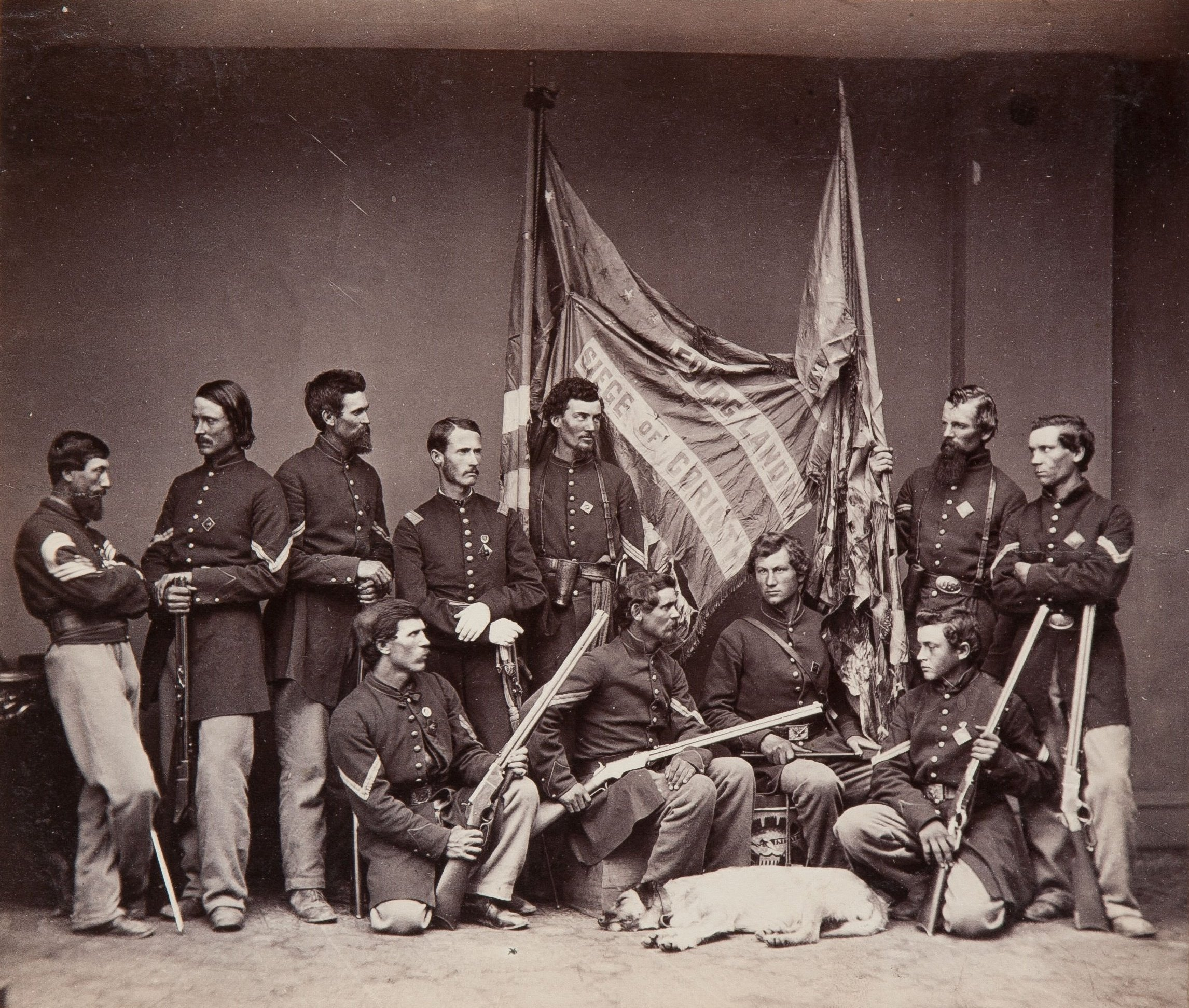
Color-bearers of the 7th IVI

During the Civil War, 256,297 men from Illinois served in the Union army, more than any other northern state except for New York, Pennsylvania and Ohio. Beginning with Illinois resident President Lincoln's first call for troops and continuing throughout the war, the state mustered 150 infantry regiments, which were numbered from the 7th Illinois to the 156th Illinois. Seventeen cavalry regiments were also mustered, as well as two light artillery regiments. Due to enthusiastic recruiting rallies and high response to voluntary calls to arms, the military draft was little used in Chicago and its environs, but was a controversial factor in supplying manpower to Illinois regiments late in the war in other regions of the state. Camp Douglas, located near Chicago, was one of the largest training camps for these troops, as well as Camp Butler near Springfield. Both served as leading prisoner-of-war camps for captive Confederates. Another significant POW camp was located at Rock Island. Several thousand Confederates died while in custody in Illinois prison camps and are buried in a series of nearby cemeteries.

There were no Civil War battles fought in Illinois, but Cairo, at the juncture of the Ohio River with the Mississippi River, became an important Union supply base, protected by Camp Defiance. Other major supply depots were located at Mound City and across the Ohio river at Fort Anderson in Paducah, Kentucky, along with sprawling facilities for the United States Navy gunboats and associated river fleets. One of which would take part in the nearby Battle of Lucas Bend. Leading major generals with Illinois ties included Ulysses S. Grant, John Buford, John Pope, John M. Schofield, John A. Logan, John A. McClernand, Benjamin Prentiss and Stephen Hurlbut. Brigadier General Elon J. Farnsworth, who began his career in the 8th Illinois Cavalry, died at the Battle of Gettysburg. President Lincoln maintained his home in Springfield, Illinois, where he is buried. Over 100 soldiers from Illinois units would earn the Medal of Honor during the conflict.

== Controversy in Little Egypt ==
Opposition to the war effort in Illinois was largely based in Little Egypt, that is the southern counties that had been settled by Southerners before 1840. A few dozen men, volunteered for the Confederate States Army in Tennessee.

Eighteen counties of southern Illinois formed the congressional district of Democrat John A. Logan. Rumors abounded in early 1861 whether he would organize his supporters and join the Confederacy. In fact he was suppressing pro-Confederate elements, and organizing his supporters to fight for the Union. Lincoln made him a general, and Logan played a major role under generals Grant and Sherman. His men marched to war as Democrats; they marched home as Republicans. Later, Logan helped found the Grand Army of the Republic veteran organization, was elected to the United States Senate as a Republican, and was the Republican vice presidential nominee in 1884. As a precaution, Union troops remained in Little Egypt for the remainder of the war.

== Home-front support: Chicago and downstate ==
During the Civil War (1861–1865), state and local government, businesses, voluntary societies. and families gave massive support to the war effort, and th national government provided heavy funding. Many new organizations were created to mobilize support, some of which became permanent.

By 1861 Chicago's commercial infrastructure and water and rail links had advanced enough to support rapid industrialization funded by the national war effort. By 1860 traffic on Lake Michigan made Chicago one of the busiest ports in the Western Hemisphere. In the 1850s the Congress granted land to railroads to promote their growth. The Illinois Central Railroad was the first to be established. Banks loaned it the $27 million needed for construction and by 1860 it operated 705 miles of track criss-crossing Illinois from Chicago to Galena to Cairo. It was the longest railway in the world. It set up a depot every ten miles, where ambitious men rushed in to start a town by buying plots from the land grant. In the decade of the 1850s, the national railway grid was expanding rapidly from 9,000 miles of track to 31,000. Outside the Midwest, rail mileage nearly tripled, but inside the region it expanded by a factor of 7 from 1,300 to 9,000 miles. Chicago thereby became the nation's greatest rail center. Much of the necessary iron and steel was imported from Pittsburgh, but new mills were Increasingly set up in Chicago. When the war broke out in 1861, Chicago's main rivals Cincinnati and St Louis lost access to their primary markets to the South. Chicago replaced them as the hub for the national distribution of wheat and meat. Furthermore, Chicago became the supply base for the Western armies, as General Ulysses S Grant took his forces on the Illinois Central—his supply line—down to Cairo. He then marched south to seize control of Kentucky and Tennessee on his way to victories at Shiloh, Vicksburg, and Chattanooga. For the entire war, the Illinois Central carried 626,000 soldiers back and forth for a total of 128,000,000 passenger miles of military service, for which the War Department paid $1.7 million.

The opening of the Union Stock Yard clinched Chicago's new dominant role for beef and pork as farmers across the hinterland shipped their cattle and hogs by rail. Hundreds of small factories opened in Chicago and downstate cities to provide Union forces with urgently needed supplies from uniforms to wagons. Between 1860 and 1870 factory employment in Cook County exploded from 5,400 to 31,000, while the city's population tripled from 112,000 people to 299,000.

All the new business necessitated expanded banking facilities. Thanks to new federal laws creating the national banking system, local financiers opened 13 national banks in the city in 1863 to 1865. Leadership came from the First National Bank of Chicago which not only served local business but also serviced accounts for 80 new national banks in 15 states. Chicago's big banks dominated the west in the same way New York's Wall Street dominated the rest of the nation's finance.

Criticism of the war appeared in Chicago as well as downstate. The Chicago Times under Wilbur F. Storey was the nation's most strident Copperhead critic of Republican Lincoln and his emancipation program. In June 1863, General Ambrose E. Burnside sent Army troops to close the newspaper. It was the leading Democratic newspaper in a Democratic city and protests were vehement, so Lincoln reversed the suppression. Some 26,000 Confederate prisoners were sent to Camp Douglas on the South Side; 4,500 of them died of disease due to deliberately inadequate sanitation and poor medical facilities.

Patriotic women mobilized to help needy Union soldiers and their families. Among them were Chicagoans Mary Livermore and Jane Hoge, who organized two gigantic Northwest Sanitary Fairs in 1863 and 1865 to raise money. Thousands of women volunteered to nurse wounded soldiers at hospitals behind the front. The male doctors were highly dubious about this spontaneous sort of unorganized help. The convalescents were appreciative; as sick civilians they rarely had been hospitalized and instead depended on care at home by mothers, sisters and wives. Most famous of all was Mother Bickerdyke who was highly visible at military hospitals in Grant's army. Back in Chicago she campaigned energetically to raise money and clothing, and tell families how their sons were being treated. The doctors, however did very much appreciate the very well organized Catholic sisters. They were already were operating their own hospitals and they sent well-trained cadres to assist doctors in military hospitals. The Sisters of Mercy based in Chicago worked on a floating hospital on the Mississippi River, and they took charge of a new hospital on shore.

Cook County and neighboring counties sent 36,000 men to war. The draft was unpopular but was seldom needed because Chicago paid irresistible cash bounties for men who volunteered. However, in the southeastern part of the state, draft resistance was fierce in several communities settled by Southerners who resented the increasing dominance of the Yankee element in the state's politics and economy.

About four thousand Chicago soldiers died in the War. Pride in their heroism became memorialized in the tall statues standing guard over parks that were often named after Grant and Lincoln.

== War politics ==
During the 1860 Presidential Election, two men from Illinois were among the four major candidates. Illinois voted in favor of Springfield resident Abraham Lincoln (172,171 votes or 50.7% of the ballots cast) over Chicagoan Stephen Douglas (160,215; 47.2%). Of minor consequence in the statewide results were Southern candidates John C. Breckinridge (2,331; 0.7%), and John Bell (4,914; 1.5%). Throughout the war, Illinois politics were dominated by Republicans under the energetic leadership of Governor Richard Yates, a Southerner from Kentucky, and Senators Lyman Trumbull and Orville H. Browning. Democrats scored major gains in the 1862 election by attacking Lincoln's emancipation plan as danger to the state since it would bring in thousands of freed slaves. As a result, the Democrats had a majority in the legislature and in 1863, Browning's Senate seat, formerly held by Douglas prior to the war, was filled by the Democrats with the election of William Alexander Richardson. In the 1864 presidential election, Illinois residents supported Lincoln's re-election, giving the president 189,512 votes (54.4% of the total) to General George McClellan's 158,724 votes (45.6%). Within a year, Lincoln was dead and his remains had been returned to Springfield for burial.

== Confederate Homefront support ==
=== Copperheads ===
Opposition views of the Peace Democrats (or "Copperheads") filled the columns of The Chicago Times, the mouthpiece of the rival Democratic Party. At one point early in the Gettysburg campaign in June 1863, Union troops forcibly closed the newspaper at bayonet point. It was only reopened when Democratic mobs threatened to destroy the rival Republican paper and President Lincoln intervened. Barry shows that Amos Green (1826–1911) from Paris, Illinois, was a leading lawyer and Peace Democrat (Copperhead). Green saw the War as unjust and Lincoln as a despot who had to be stopped. He wrote vicious denunciations of the administration in local newspapers. He was arrested for sedition in 1862. After his release in August 1862, he became the grand commander of the secret Order of American Knights in Illinois, which fought restrictions on civil liberties. It was also called the Knights of the Golden Circle and later the Sons of Liberty. Green was funded by the Confederate government to arrange riots at the Democratic National Convention in 1864. Although the riots never materialized, he continued giving antigovernment speeches until he was again arrested in November 1864. After this arrest, he agreed to testify for the government about the activities of the Knights; his testimony implicated others but ignored his own deep involvement in antigovernment plots. In 1864, a clash between Copperheads and Union Soldiers in Charleston, Illinois resulted in nine dead and twelve wounded in what is now called the "Charleston Riot".

== Notable leaders from Illinois ==
Pres.
Abraham Lincoln

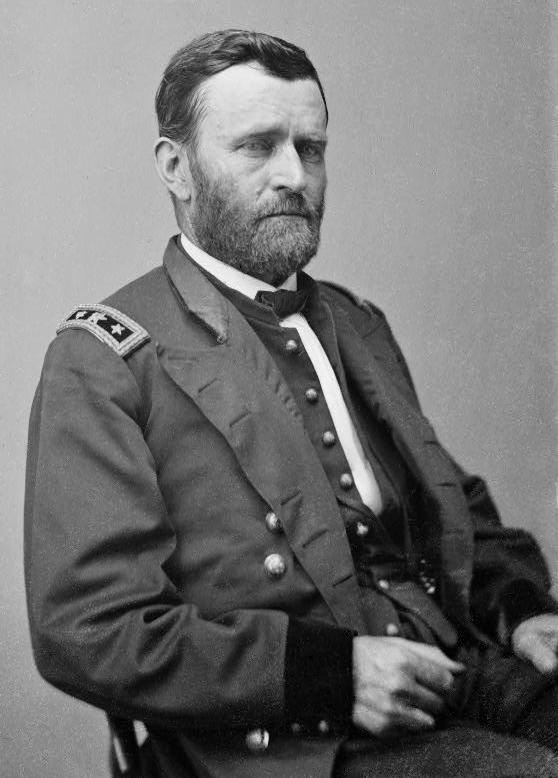
Lt. Gen.
Ulysses S. Grant

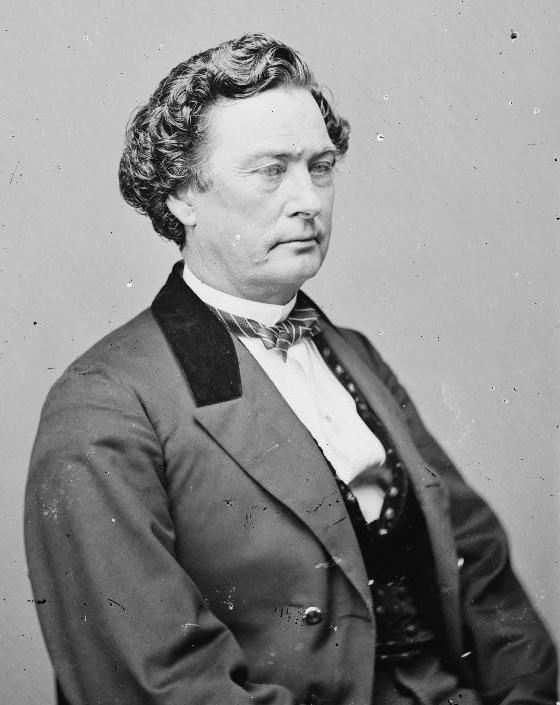
Gov.
Richard Yates

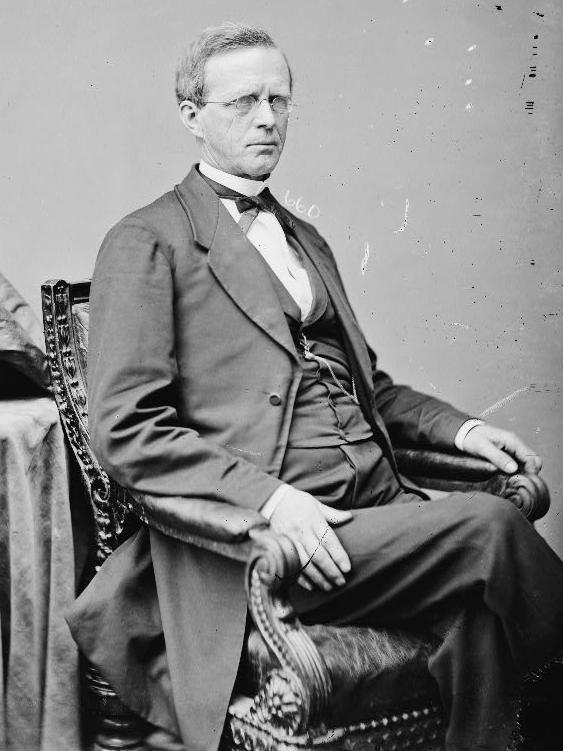
Sen.
Lyman Trumbull

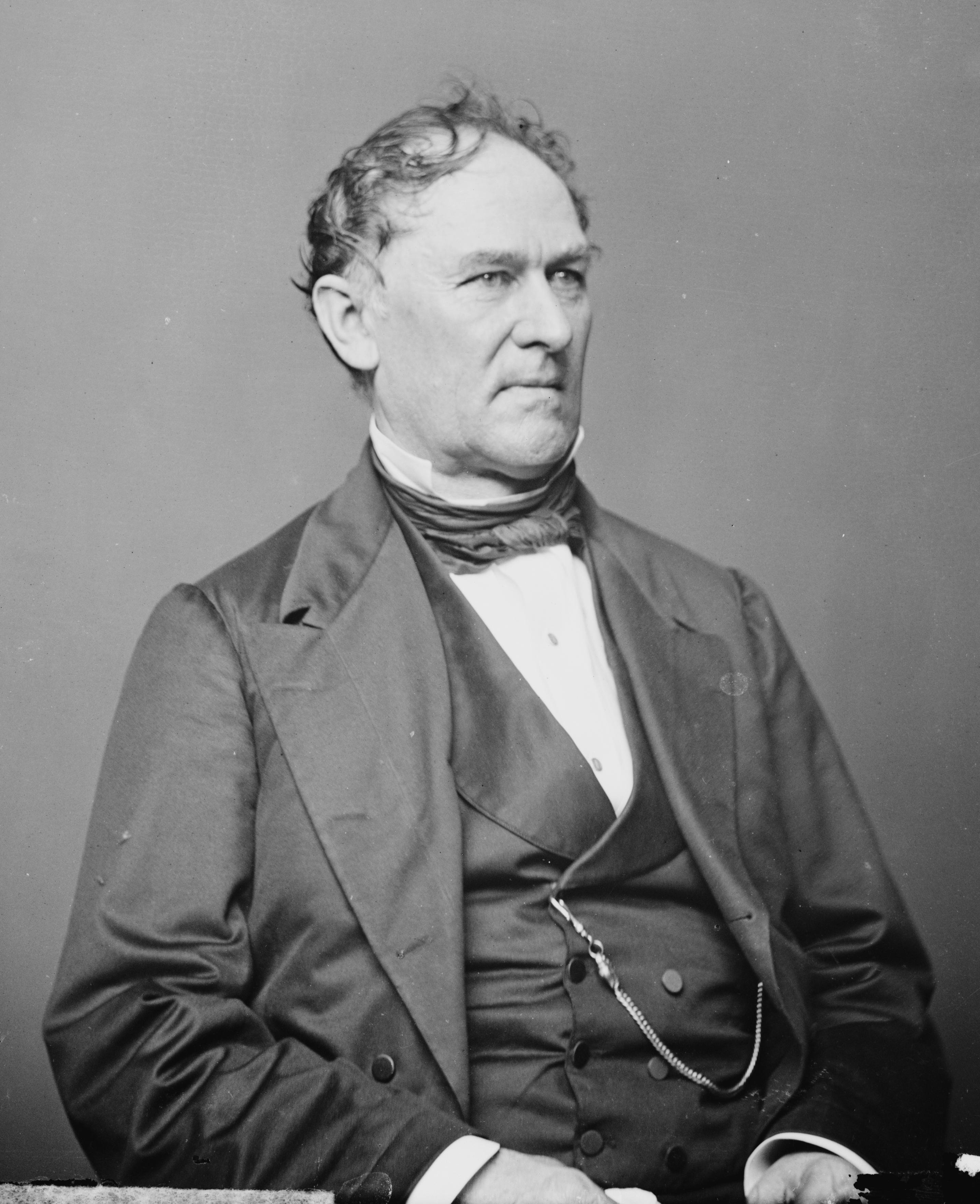
Sen.
Orville H. Browning

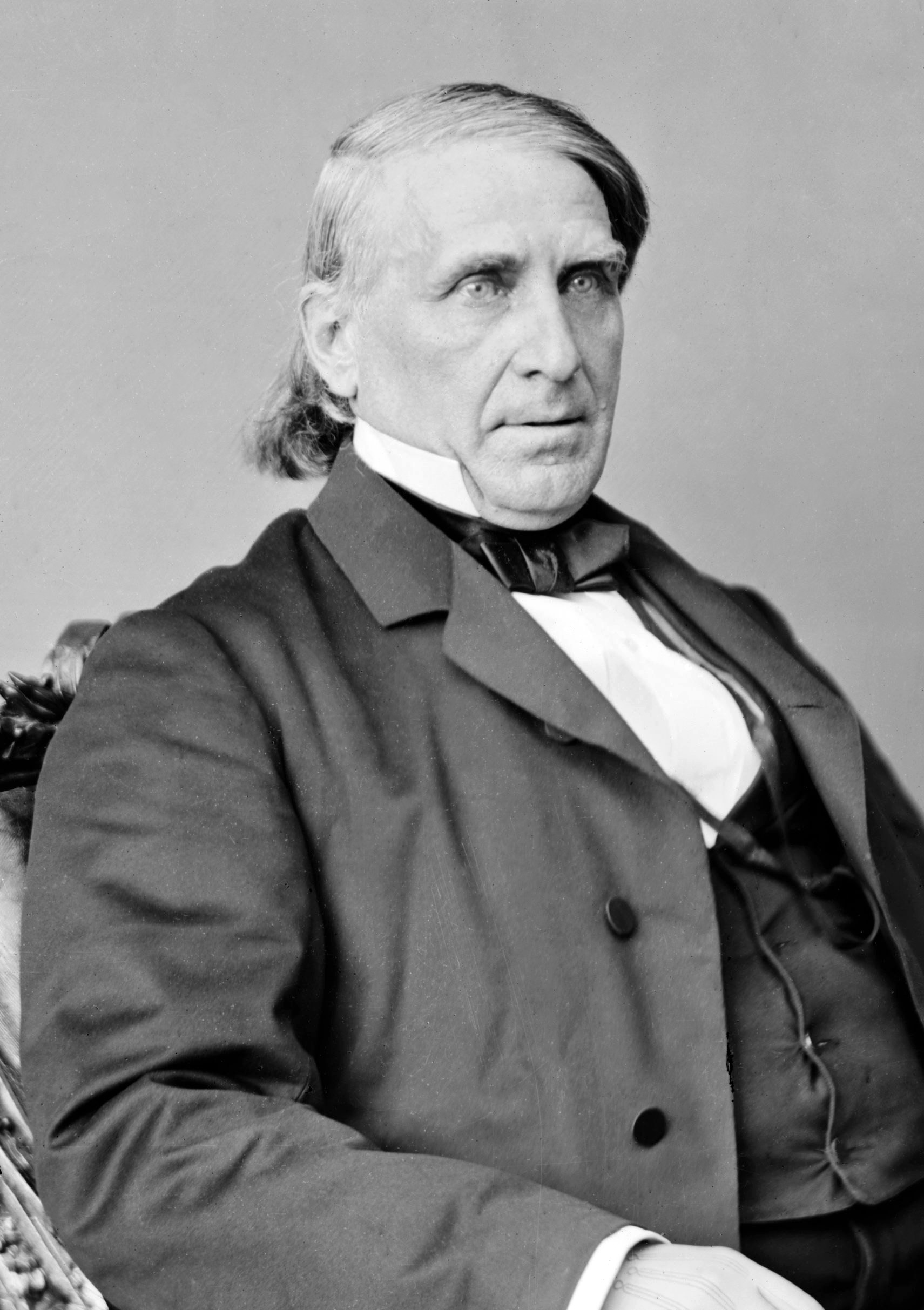
Rep.
Elihu B. Washburne

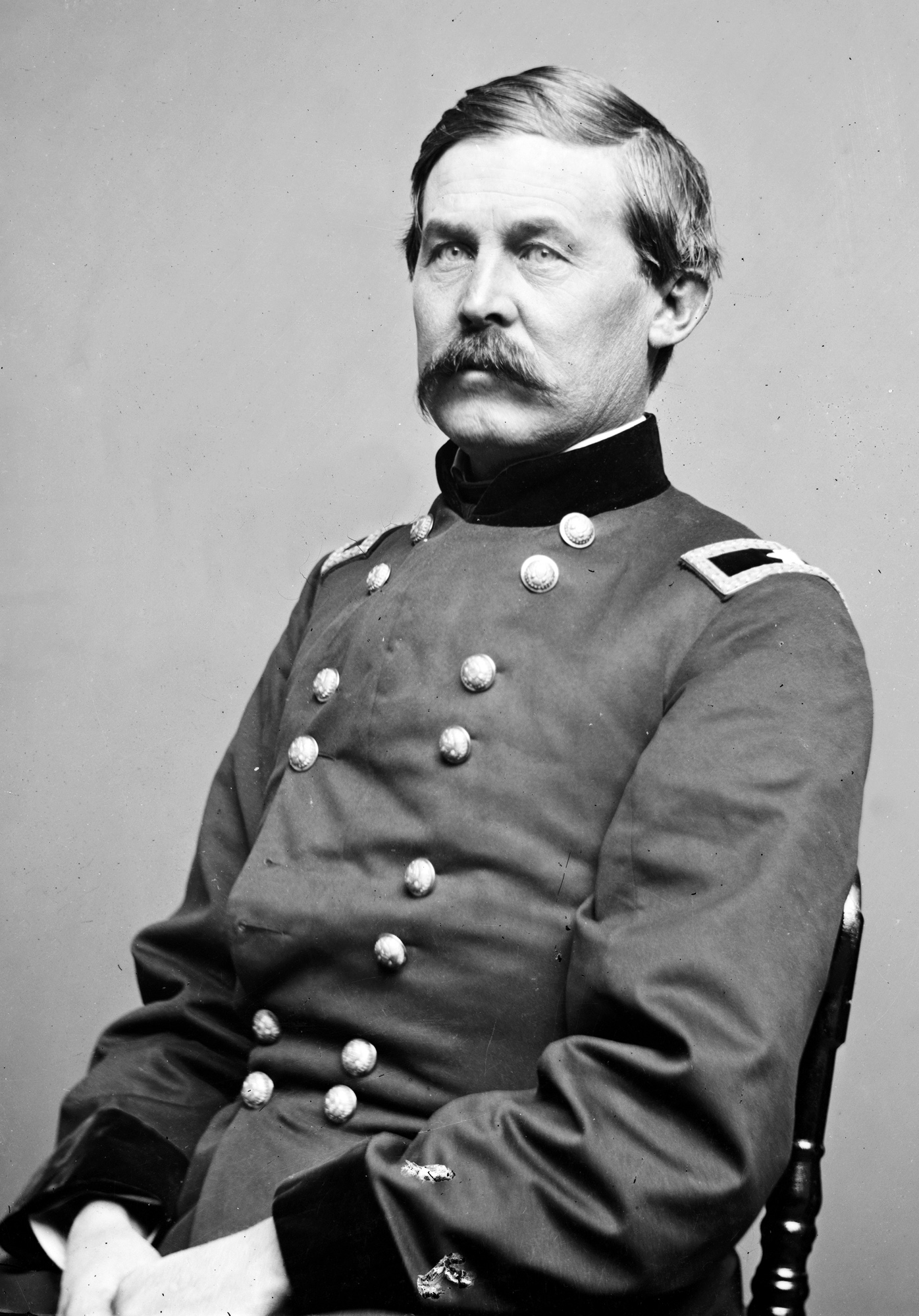
Maj. Gen.
John Buford

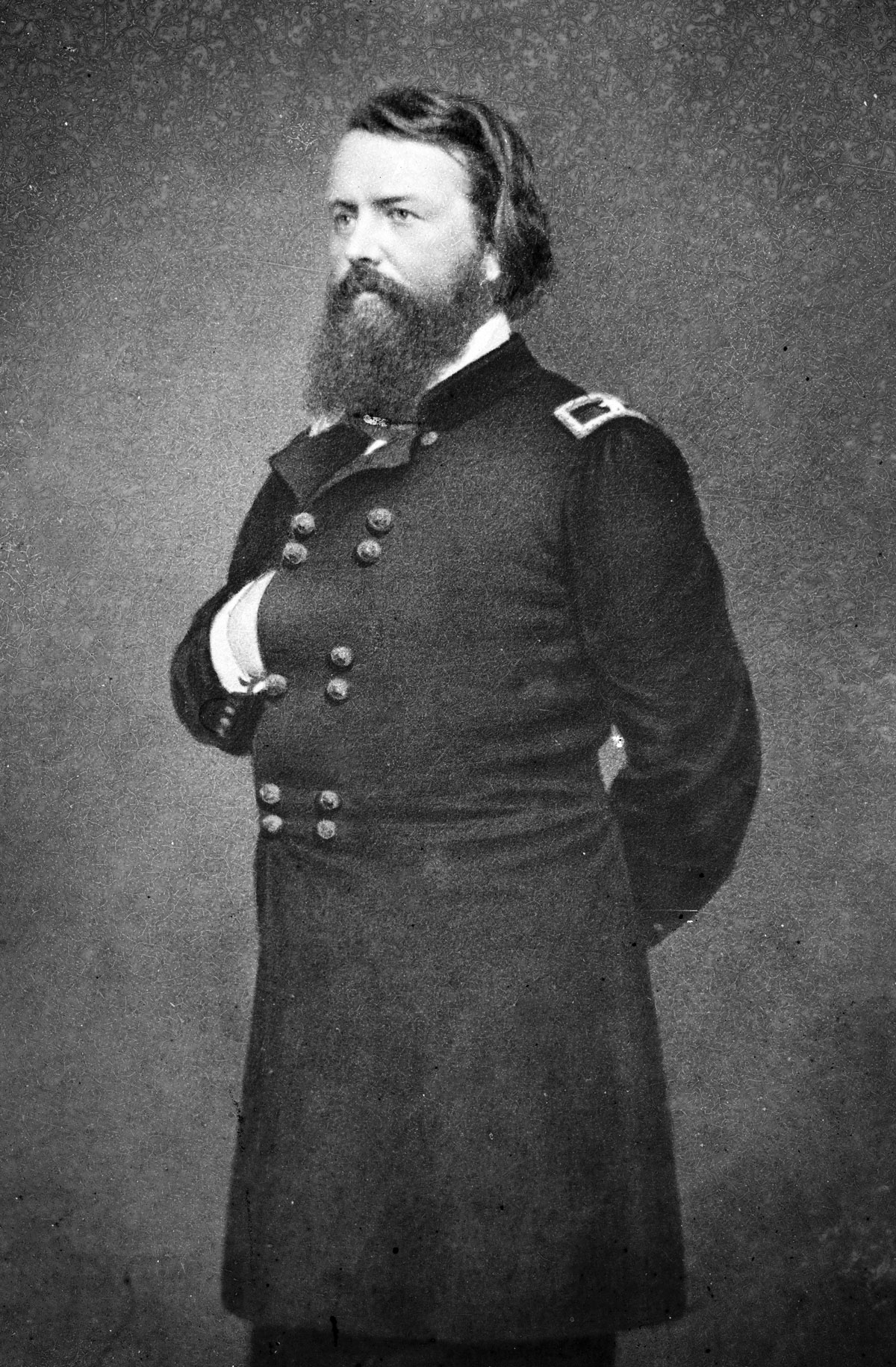
Maj. Gen.
John Pope

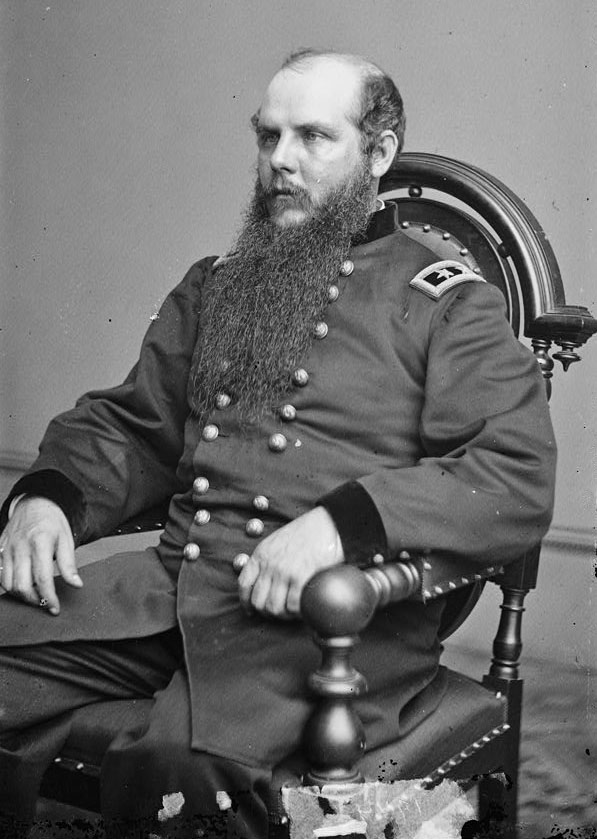
Maj. Gen.
John M. Schofield

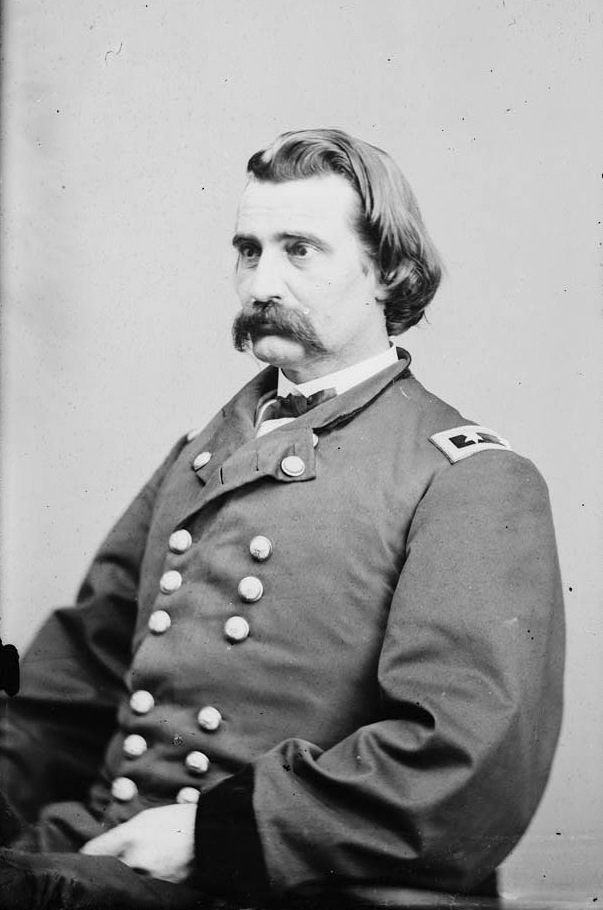
Maj. Gen.
John A. Logan

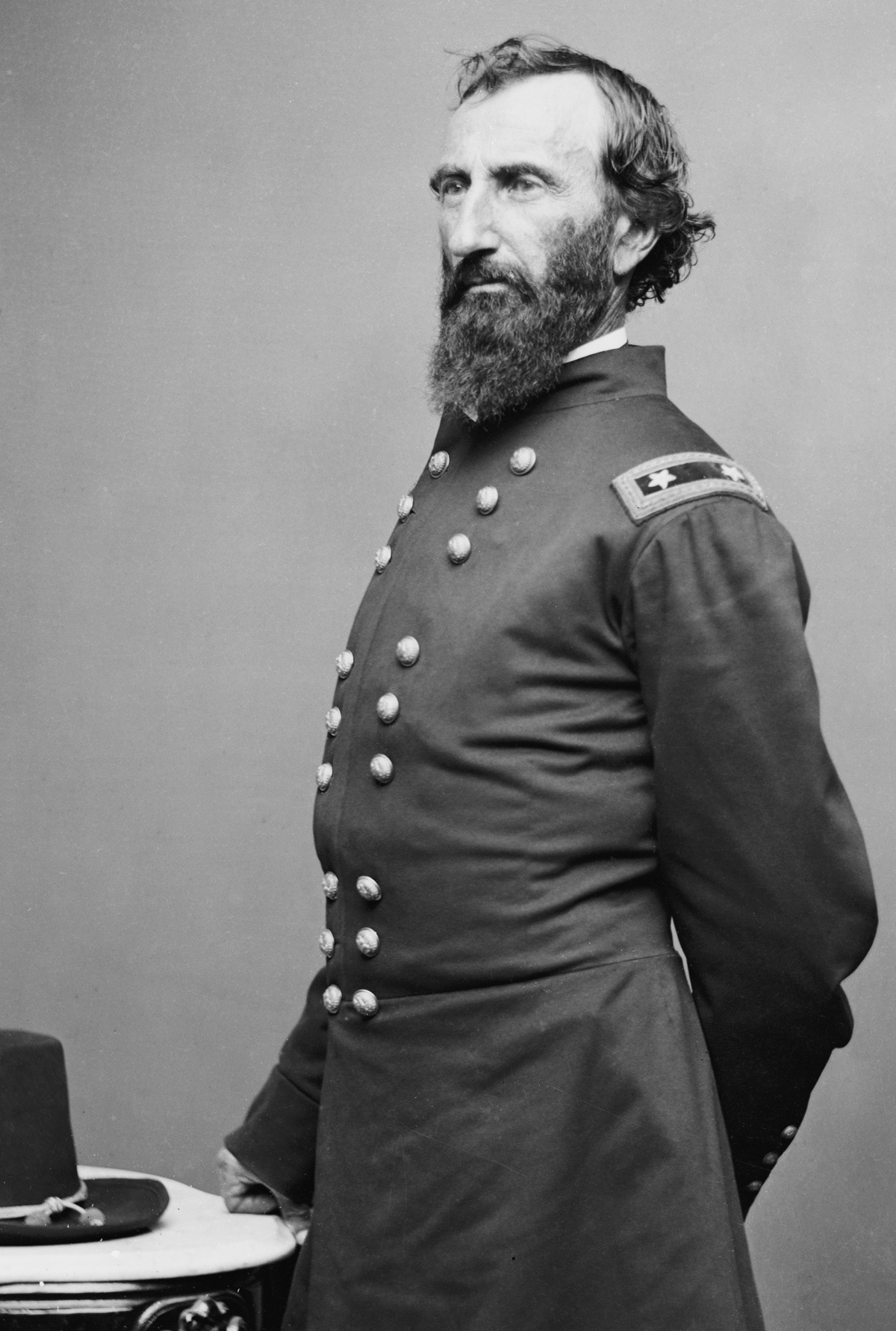
Maj. Gen.
John A. McClernand

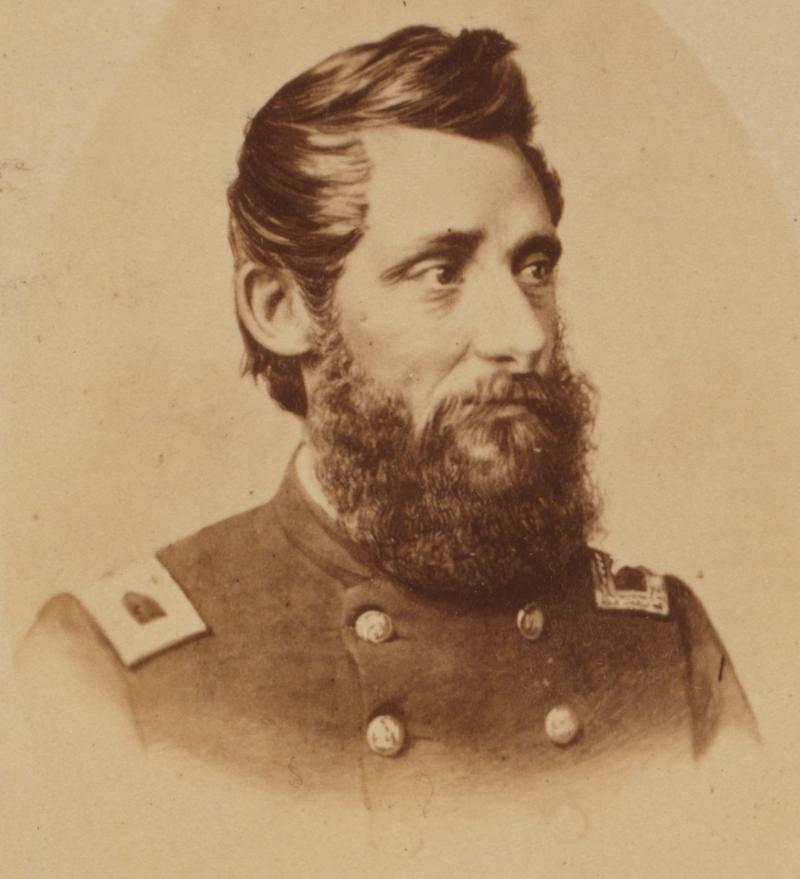
Maj. Gen.
Benjamin Grierson

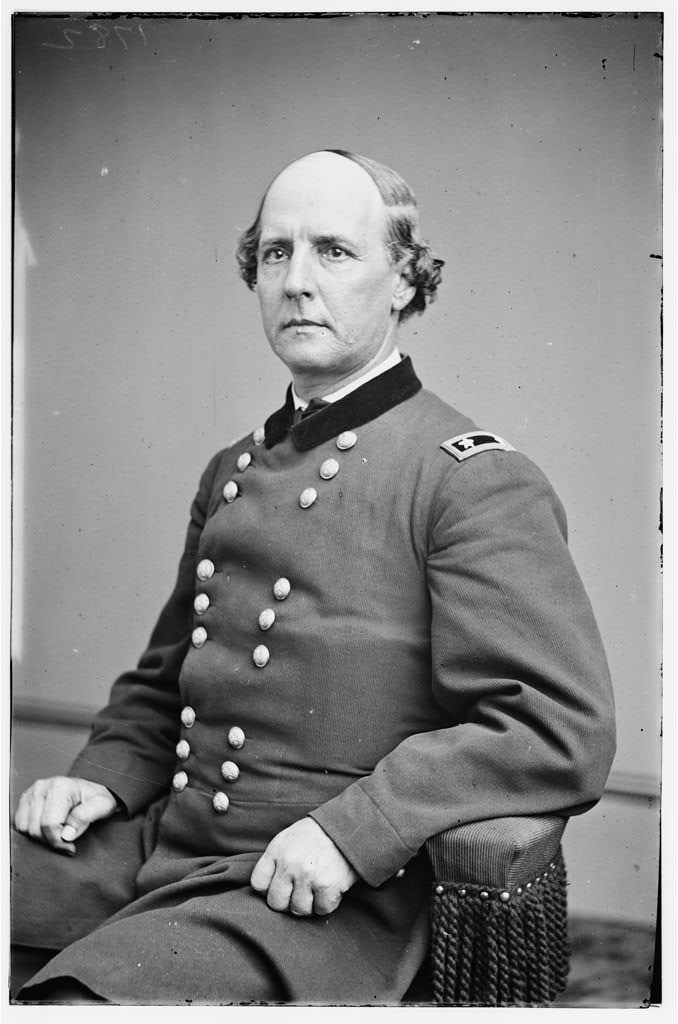
Maj. Gen.
Stephen A. Hurlbut

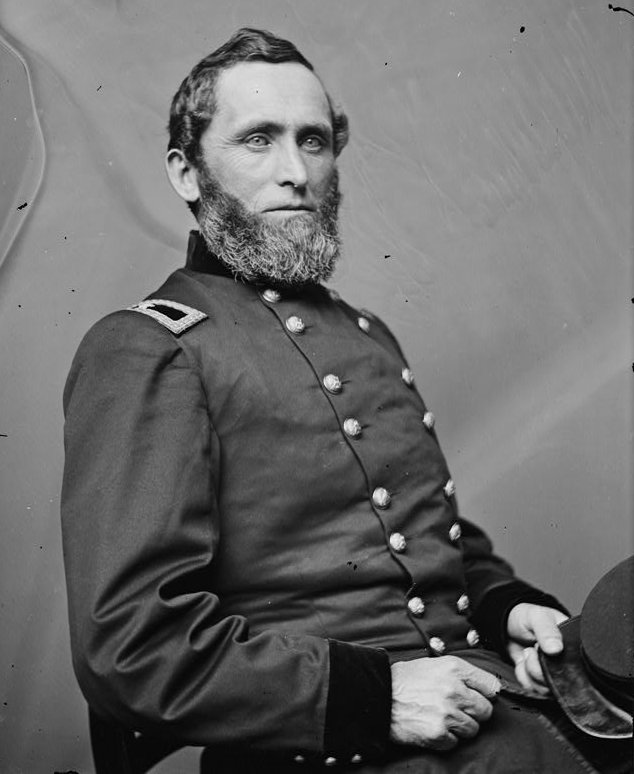
Maj. Gen.
Benjamin Prentiss

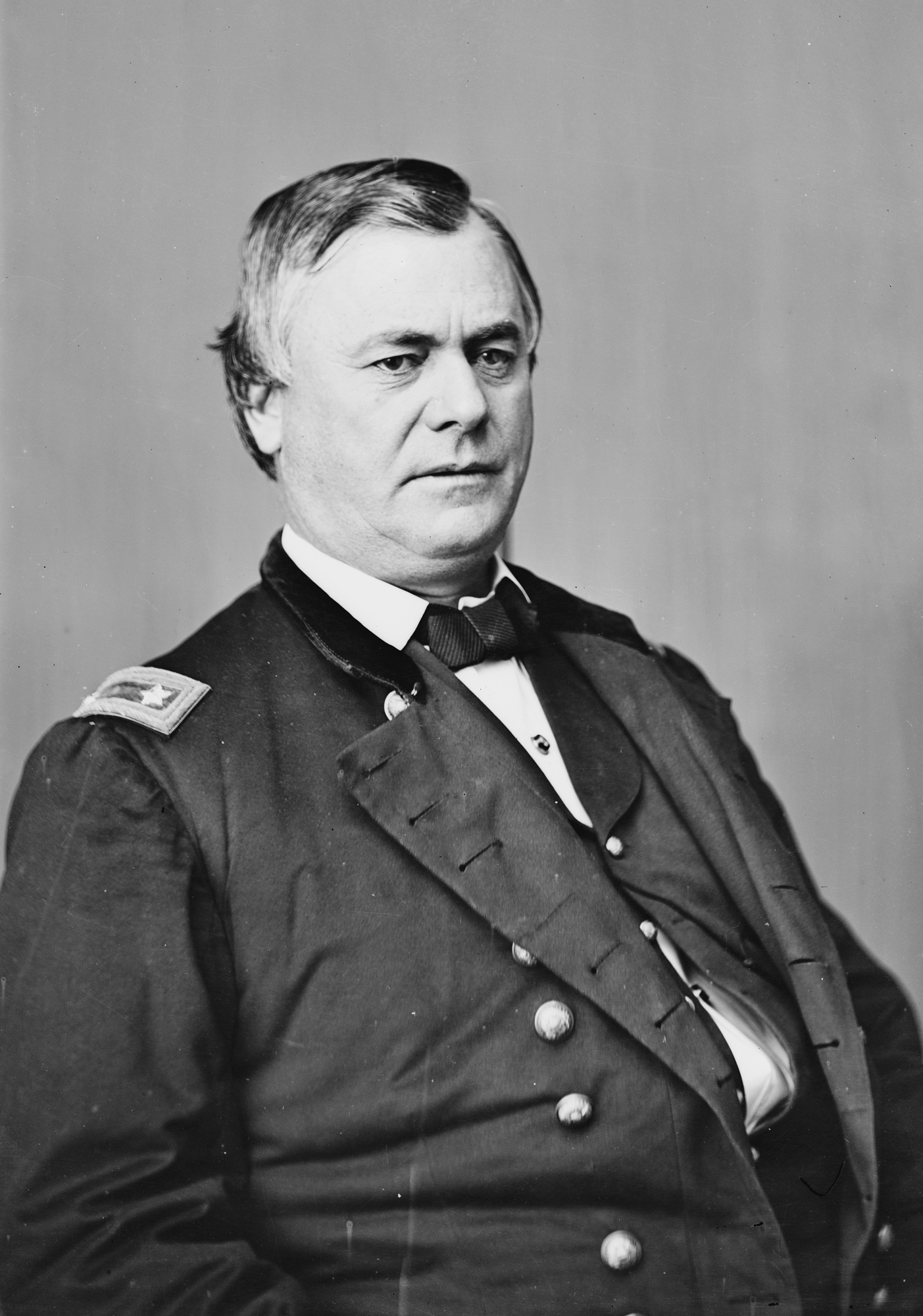
Maj. Gen.
Richard J. Oglesby

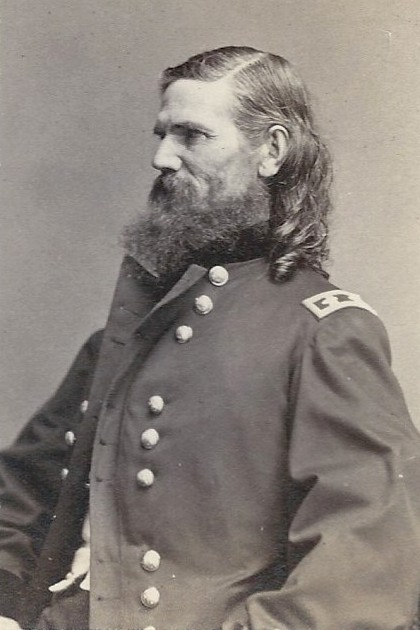
Bvt. Maj. Gen
Elias Smith Dennis

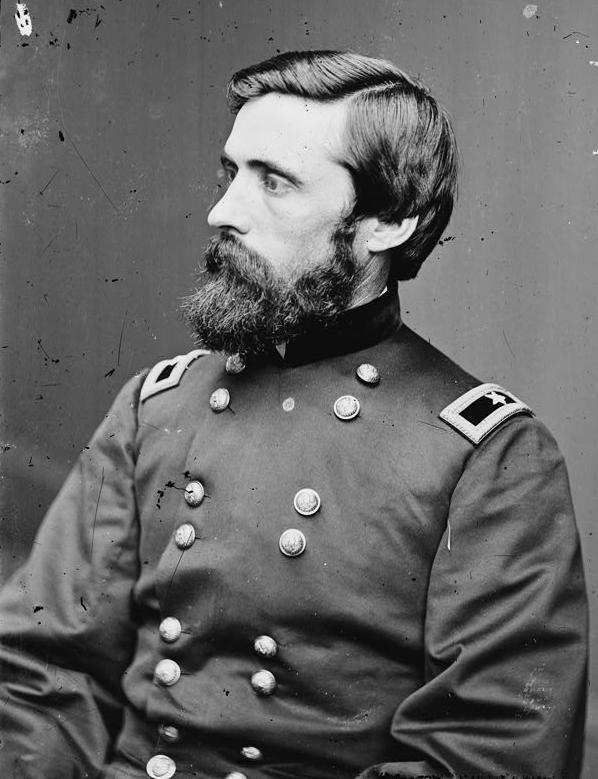
Bvt. Maj. Gen
John Aaron Rawlins

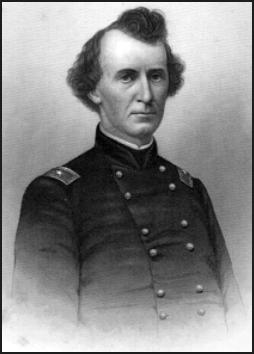
Brig. Gen.
W.H.L. Wallace

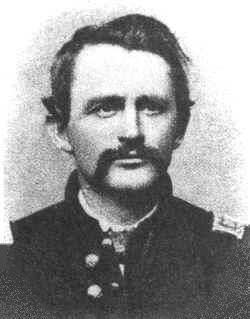
Brig. Gen.
Elon J. Farnsworth

Among the many Illinois generals who rose to post-war prominence were Ulysses S. Grant, who became president in 1869, Green B. Raum, who became a U.S. congressman and the Commissioner of the Internal Revenue Service, and James L. Alcorn, who was a U.S. Senator and the Governor of Mississippi. Both were born near Golconda. Galena-born John Aaron Rawlins, long a confidant of U.S. Grant, became the United States Secretary of War in the Grant Administration. John M. Palmer, a resident of Carlinville, was a postbellum Governor of Illinois and the presidential candidate of the National Democratic Party in the 1896 election. Edward S. Salomon, an immigrant from Europe, was appointed by President Grant as the Governor of the Washington Territory. William P. Carlin of Carrollton became a general in the postbellum U.S. Army and commanded several outposts in Montana and elsewhere.

A number of soldiers from Illinois regiments would eventually become governors of U.S. states. Among them were John Marshall Hamilton, future governor of Illinois; Albinus Nance, future governor of Nebraska; John St. John, future governor of Kansas; and Samuel Rinnah Van Sant, future governor of Minnesota.

== See also ==
- History of Illinois
- List of Illinois Civil War Units
- Bibliography of the American Civil War
- Bibliography of Abraham Lincoln
- Bibliography of Ulysses S. Grant on General Grant's staff

== Research resources ==
- Civil War Records of the 4th Illinois Volunteer Cavalry, 1861–1864 (6 volumes) are housed in the Department of Special Collections and University Archives at Stanford University Libraries
