= 196th Pennsylvania Infantry Regiment =

Union Army infantry regiment

196th Pennsylvania Volunteer Infantry
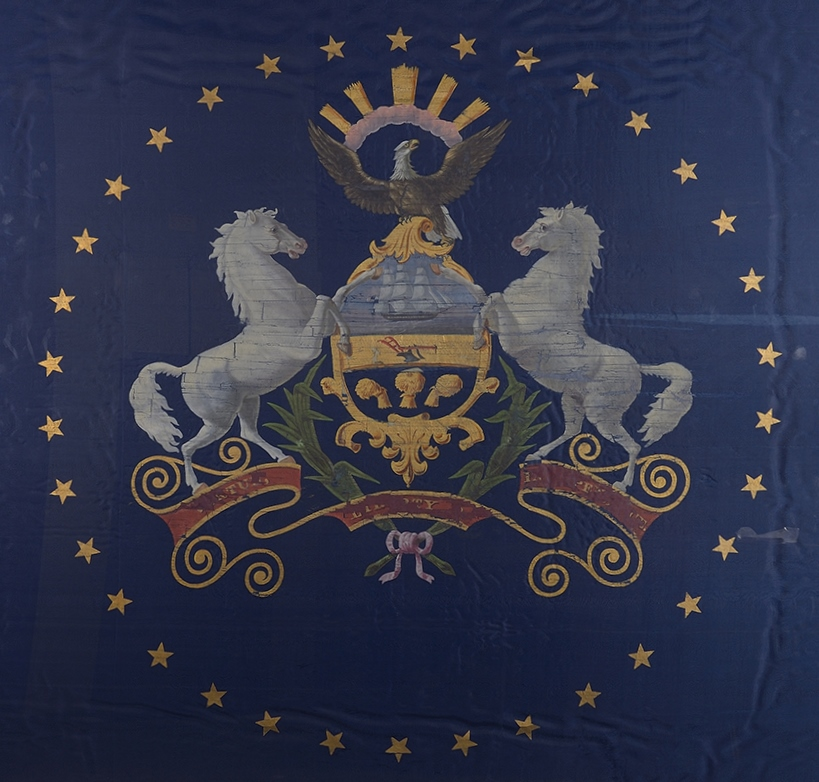
- State Flag of Pennsylvania, circa 1863.
- Active: 20 July–17 November 1864
- Country: United States of America
- Allegiance: Union
- Branch: Union Army
- Role: Infantry
- Size: 958 officers and men (total enrollment)

The 196th Regiment Pennsylvania Volunteer Infantry, alternately the 5th Union League Regiment was an infantry regiment of the Union Army in the American Civil War. Raised in Philadelphia in mid-1864, the regiment was made up of Hundred Days Men in an effort to augment existing manpower for an all-out push to end the war within 100 days, and spent most of its service guarding Confederate prisoners of war at Camp Douglas.

== History ==
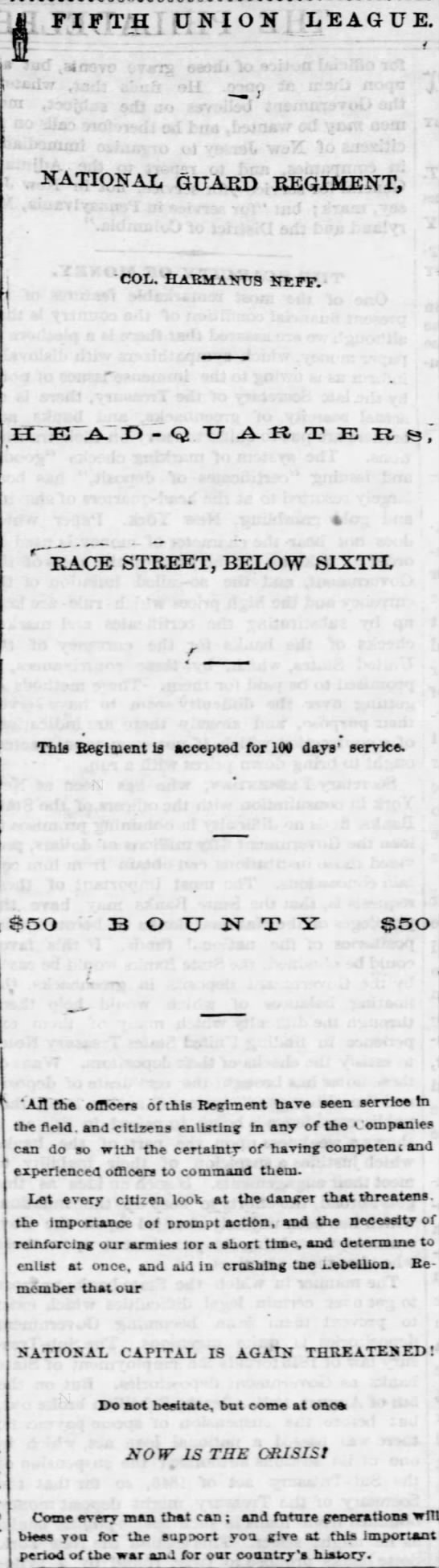
A newspaper recruitment advertisement for the regiment

The regiment was organized at Camp Cadwalader near Philadelphia on 20 July 1864, under the command of printer and Volunteer officer Colonel Harmanus Neff; it had a total enrollment of 958. It was alternately known as the 5th Union League Regiment due to its being organized with the assistance of the Union League of Philadelphia. A week after its organization, on 27 July, the 196th Pennsylvania was sent to Camp Bradford at Mankin's Woods near Baltimore, attached to the 3rd Separate Brigade of VIII Corps. From there, it entrained for Chicago in mid-August, where it guarded Confederate prisoners of war at Camp Douglas. Company H was detached to perform provost duty at Springfield, Illinois on 26 August, and remained there until the end of its term. The regiment helped foil an escape on the night of 27 September by firing at outside sympathizers who had mobilized to facilitate the attempt. In early November, the regiment was sent back to Philadelphia, and left for brief service at Fort Delaware on 5 November. It was mustered out at Philadelphia on 17 November, having lost ten men to disease during its service.

== Notable personnel ==
Future baseball player Ned Cuthbert served with the regiment as a private in Company F.

== See also ==
- List of Pennsylvania Civil War regiments
- Pennsylvania in the Civil War
