= Joseph H. Tucker =

- Born: c. 1819; New York
- Died: October 22, 1894 (aged 74–75); New York City
- Burial place: Graceland Cemetery
- Military career
- Allegiance: United States
- Branch: Illinois militia
- Service years: 1861–1862
- Rank: Colonel
- Conflicts: American Civil War
- Other work: Businessman, stockbroker

Joseph H. Tucker (c. 1819 – October 22, 1894) was a banker, businessman and Illinois militia colonel during the first two years of the American Civil War (Civil War). He was given initial responsibility for building Camp Douglas at Chicago, Illinois, and was the first commander of the camp. Originally a training camp for Union Army recruits, in 1862 and 1863 Camp Douglas was converted into a prison camp for Confederate States Army prisoners captured by the Union Army. Tucker was commander of the camp from the start of its construction in October 1861 until September 28, 1862, except between February 26, 1862, and June 19, 1862. During this time, the camp was used as a training facility and had its initial use as a prisoner of war camp. Tucker was never mustered into the Union Army, remaining a colonel in the Illinois militia during the term of his service in the Civil War.

== Early life ==
Joseph H. Tucker was born in New York in about 1819, the son of a Baptist minister. Tucker had been a banker and businessman in Cumberland, Maryland, before he moved to Chicago, Illinois, in 1858. He was a successful businessman, banker and stock trader.

== American Civil War service ==
=== Background ===
On April 15, 1861, the day after the U.S. Army garrison surrendered Fort Sumter to Confederate forces, President Abraham Lincoln called 75,000 state militiamen into federal service for ninety days to put down the insurrection. Lincoln made further calls for volunteers on May 3, 1861, and the U.S. Congress retroactively approved Lincoln's actions and authorized another one million three–year volunteers in July 1861. The states and localities had to organize and equip the volunteer regiments until late in 1861 when the federal government became sufficiently organized to take over the project.

Soon after President Lincoln's calls for volunteers, many volunteers from Illinois gathered in various large public and private buildings in Chicago and then overflowed into camps on the prairie on the southeast edge of the city. Senator Stephen A. Douglas owned land next to this location and had donated land just south of the camps to the original University of Chicago.

=== Building Camp Douglas, First Tucker command ===
Illinois Governor Richard Yates assigned Judge Allen C. Fuller, soon to be adjutant general for the State of Illinois, to select the site for a permanent army camp at Chicago. Judge Fuller selected the site that was already in use for the makeshift camps because it was only four miles from downtown Chicago, prairie surrounded the site, nearby Lake Michigan could provide water and the Illinois Central Railroad ran within a few hundred yards of the site. Fuller was not an engineer and did not realize that the site was a poor choice for a large camp because of its wet, low–lying location. The camp initially lacked adequate medical facilities, sewers, latrines and drainage and when the camp opened, it had only one water hydrant.

Governor Yates put Colonel Joseph H. Tucker, commanding the 60th Regiment, Illinois State Militia, in charge of building the camp and appointed Tucker as the camp's first commander. State militia troops called the Mechanics Fusileers, who were apprentice and journeyman carpenters, built the barracks in October and November 1861. Regular troops had to suppress rioting construction troops and restore order to the camp when the State tried to convert them to infantry and reneged on a promise of extra pay. This was only the beginning of Tucker's problems.

By November 15, 1861, Camp Douglas housed about 4,222 volunteer soldiers from 11 regiments. In an ominous preview of the effects of living at the camp on the future prisoners, the recruits, who were in better physical condition than the later prisoners, suffered forty-two deaths from disease by February 1862. Colonel Tucker's job as camp commander was not easy even before the camp was converted to a prison camp. He had to use increasingly hard measures to curb considerable drunk and disorderly conduct by recruits in camp and in the city of Chicago, where the soldiers abused pass privileges.

On February 16, 1862, the Union Army under then Brigadier General Ulysses S. Grant captured Fort Donelson on the Cumberland River near Dover, Tennessee and with it about 12,000 to 15,000 Confederate prisoners. The army was unprepared to handle this large group of prisoners and scrambled to find places to house them. Colonel Tucker told General Grant's superior, Major General Henry W. Halleck, that Camp Douglas could accommodate 8,000 or 9,000 prisoners, which was about the same number of recruits that the camp was supposed to be able to accommodate. As it turned out, the camp and its staff could not even easily handle the 4,459 prisoners who were sent to it.

The first Confederate prisoners of war arrived at Camp Douglas on February 20, 1862, to find a camp but no real prison. They were housed for their first few days at the camp in the White Oak Square section along with newly–trained Union soldiers about to depart for service at the front. The army sent sick prisoners to the camp, where there were no medical facilities at the time, even though army staff were specifically warned not to do so. On February 23, 1862, the Union troops vacated the camp except for an inadequate force of about 40 officers and 469 enlisted men left to guard the prisoners. About 77 escapes were recorded at Camp Douglas by June 1862.

On February 26, 1862, General Halleck ordered Colonel Tucker to report to Springfield, Illinois and a Union Army officer from Illinois, Colonel James A. Mulligan, took command of the camp until June 14, 1862. Between June 14 and June 19, 1862 Colonel Daniel Cameron, Jr. was in charge.

=== Colonel Mulligan's command ===
The first group of prisoners was treated reasonably well under the circumstances and despite the inadequacy of the grounds, barracks and sewer and water systems, they were given clothing and enough to eat, although not a balanced diet. They received enough to eat, cooking stoves and utensils and clothing. Nonetheless, sickness and death among the prisoners, and even among some guards, reached epidemic levels. Frozen hydrants led to a water shortage. One in eight of the prisoners from Fort Donelson died of pneumonia or various diseases.

After the Union Army victory at the battle of Shiloh and capture of Island No. 10 in the spring of 1862, Camp Douglas housed 8,962 Confederate prisoners. Conditions at the camp further deteriorated with the overcrowding. Escapes increased. Some escapes were aided by Southern sympathizers in Chicago and others were facilitated by lax administration by Colonel Mulligan and the guards.

=== Second Tucker command ===
Even though he remained in the Illinois militia and was not taken into federal service, Colonel Tucker returned to command the camp on June 19, 1862. To deal with local civilian sympathizers who might be aiding escapes, Colonel Tucker declared martial law on July 12, 1862. When twenty–five prisoners escaped on July 23, 1862, Tucker arrested several citizens who he believed aided the escapees. In addition, he brought in Chicago police to search the camp. This action caused much lasting animosity from the prisoners because the police confiscated many of the prisoners' valuables. The police also confiscated five pistols and many bullets. Twenty of the escapees were recaptured within two weeks.

In the summer of 1862, Henry Whitney Bellows, president of the U.S. Sanitary Commission, wrote the following to Lieutenant Colonel William Hoffman, Union Army commissary general of prisoners, who had considerable authority over Union prison camps, after visiting the camp: "Sir, the amount of standing water, unpoliced grounds, of foul sinks, of unventilated and crowded barracks, of general disorder, of soil reeking miasmatic accretions, of rotten bones and emptying of camp kettles, is enough to drive a sanitarian to despair. I hope that no thought will be entertained of mending matters. The absolute abandonment of the spot seems to be the only judicious course. I do not believe that any amount of drainage would purge that soil loaded with accumulated filth or those barracks fetid with two stories of vermin and animal exhalations. Nothing but fire can cleanse them." Hoffman already had made requests for improvements in the camp, but he kept the report secret because he did not want to take a position contrary to that taken by any superior such as Quartermaster General Meigs, who opposed costly improvements to the camp. The camp was such an unhealthy place that one of Colonel Tucker's sons who served with him at the camp, Captain Lansing Tucker, became ill and died in the summer of 1862.

Conditions at the camp improved that summer as almost all the prisoners left by September 1862. About one thousand prisoners took an oath of allegiance to the United States and were freed. All prisoners who were not too ill to travel were exchanged due to implementation of the July 22, 1862 Dix–Hill prisoner cartel between the Union and Confederate armies. By October 6, 1862, the few remaining prisoners who had been too ill to leave earlier also were gone. Through September 1862, 980 Confederate prisoners and 240 Union Army trainees and guards had died at Camp Douglas, almost all from disease.

In the fall of 1862, Camp Douglas again briefly became a training camp for Union army volunteers. The Union Army then used the camp for its most unusual purpose.

=== Final service with Tyler ===
Union soldiers who were paroled after their capture by Confederate Lieutenant General Thomas J. "Stonewall" Jackson at the Battle of Harpers Ferry, Virginia (later West Virginia) on September 15, 1862, were sent to Camp Douglas for temporary detention. Under the terms of the prisoner cartel, they had to await formal exchange before they could leave the camp. These 8,000 paroled Union soldiers began to arrive at Camp Douglas on September 28, 1862. Brigadier General Daniel Tyler relieved Colonel Tucker of command of the camp. Under Tyler's command these Union soldiers had to live under similar conditions to those endured by the Confederate prisoners from Fort Donelson. In fact, the conditions were worse because the camp had become filthy and even more run down during its occupancy by the prisoners. The paroled soldiers were fortunate to have only about a two-month stay. They were able to tolerate the conditions somewhat better than the previous Confederate prisoners could because the Union parolees were more warmly dressed and in better physical condition. The damp conditions and bad food still took their toll on the parolees. By November, forty soldiers of the 126th New York Volunteer Infantry Regiment were dead and about another sixty were ill with fevers. Soon after Tucker's resignation from the Illinois militia, Brigadier General Jacob Ammen became the camp commander.

== Later life ==
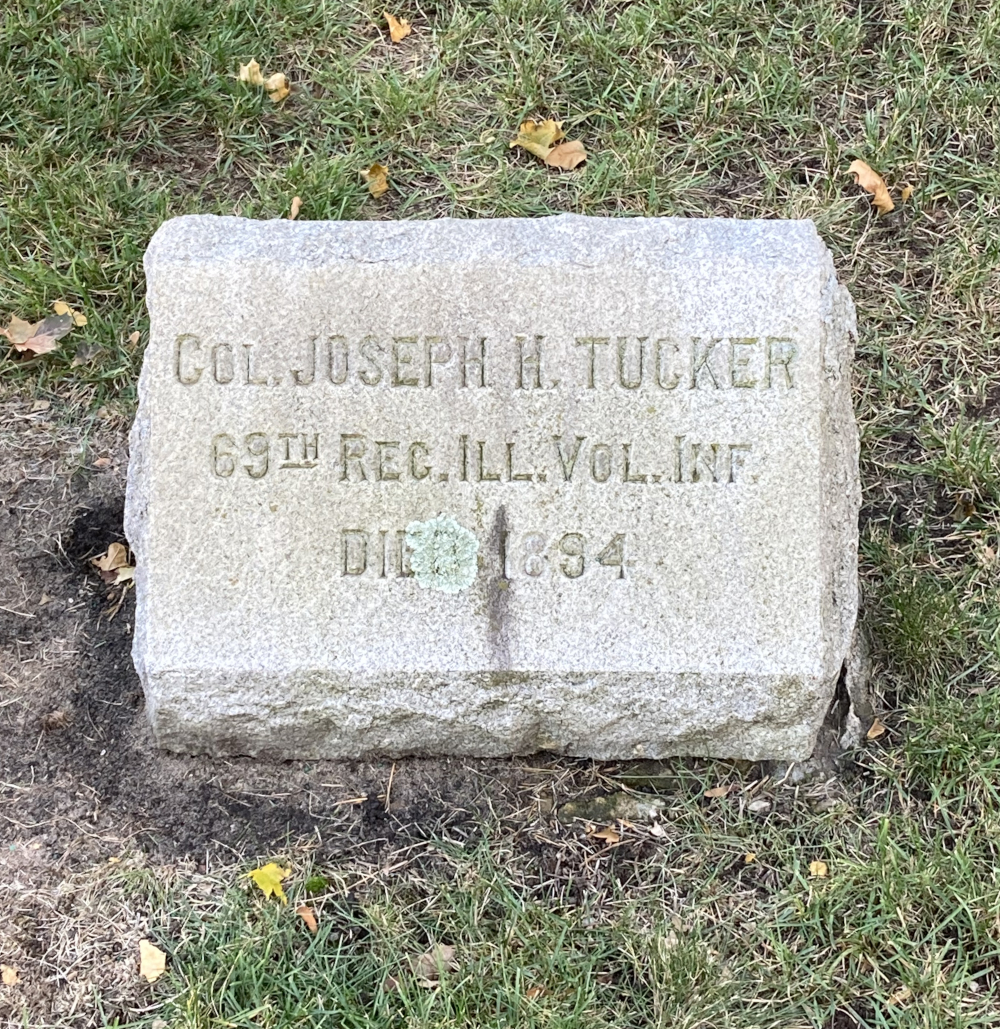
Tucker's grave at Graceland Cemetery

Having lost two of his sons in the war, Tucker left Chicago in 1865, never to return. He became a businessman and Member of New York and Consolidated Stock Exchanges in New York City until he became an invalid by 1887.

Joseph H. Tucker died in New York City on October 22, 1894, aged 74 or 75.

He was buried at Graceland Cemetery in Chicago.
