= Camp Douglas (Chicago) =

Civil War camp in Illinois

Coordinates: 41°50′13″N 87°36′55″W

- Chicago, Illinois, US
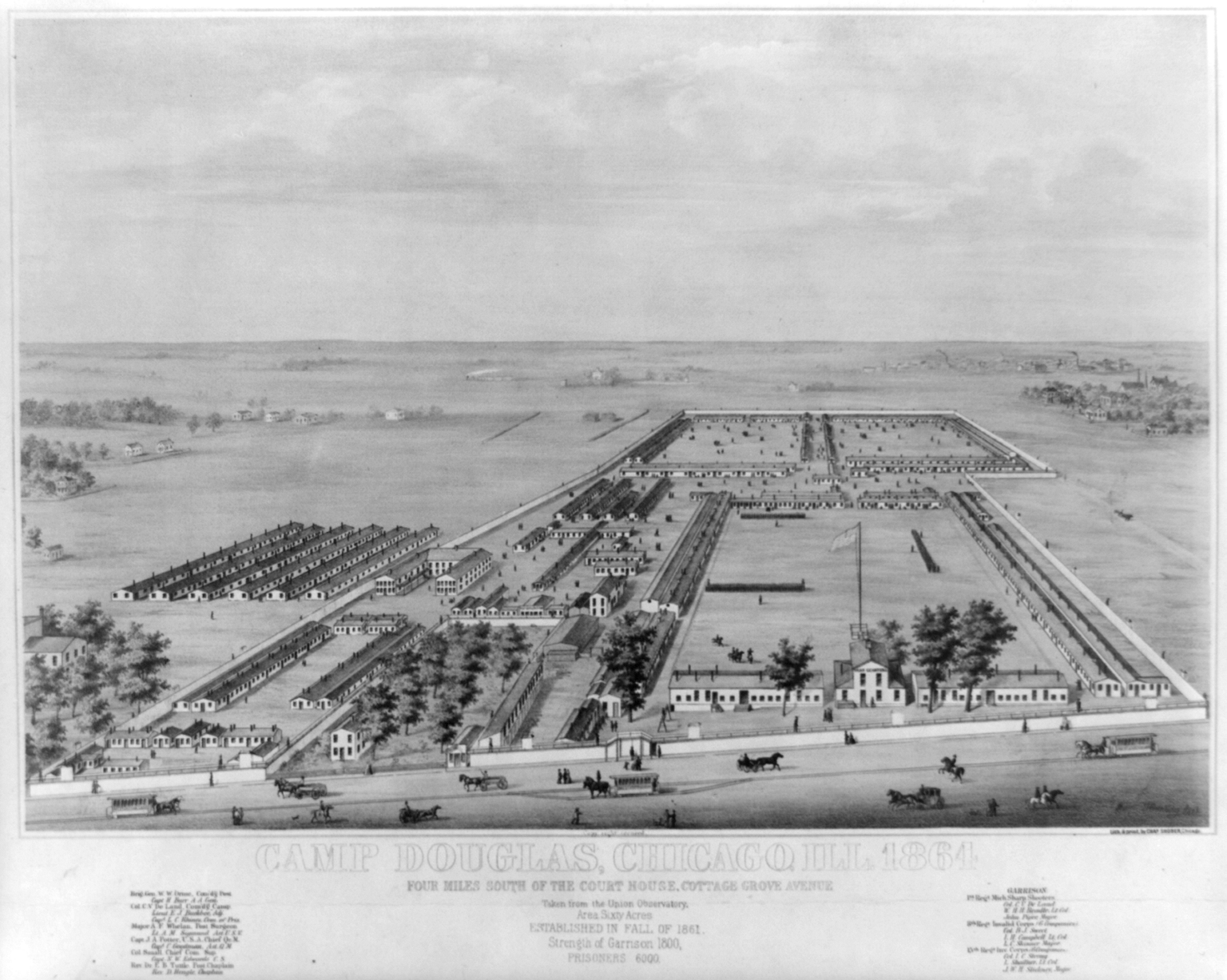
- Union soldier training camp and the largest prisoner of war camp for detaining military personnel of the Confederate States of America

Site information
- Type: Training Camp and Union Prison Camp
- Owner: U.S. Government
- Controlled by: Union Army

Site history
- Built: 1861
- In use: 1861–1865
- Demolished: 1865
- Battles/wars: American Civil War

Garrison information
- Past commanders: Brigadier General Daniel Tyler Brigadier General Jacob Ammen Brigadier General William W. Orme Colonel Joseph H. Tucker Colonel Arno Voss Colonel James A. Mulligan Colonel Daniel Cameron Colonel Charles V. DeLand Colonel James C. Strong Colonel Benjamin J. Sweet Captain J. S. Putnam
- Occupants: Union soldiers, Confederate prisoners of war

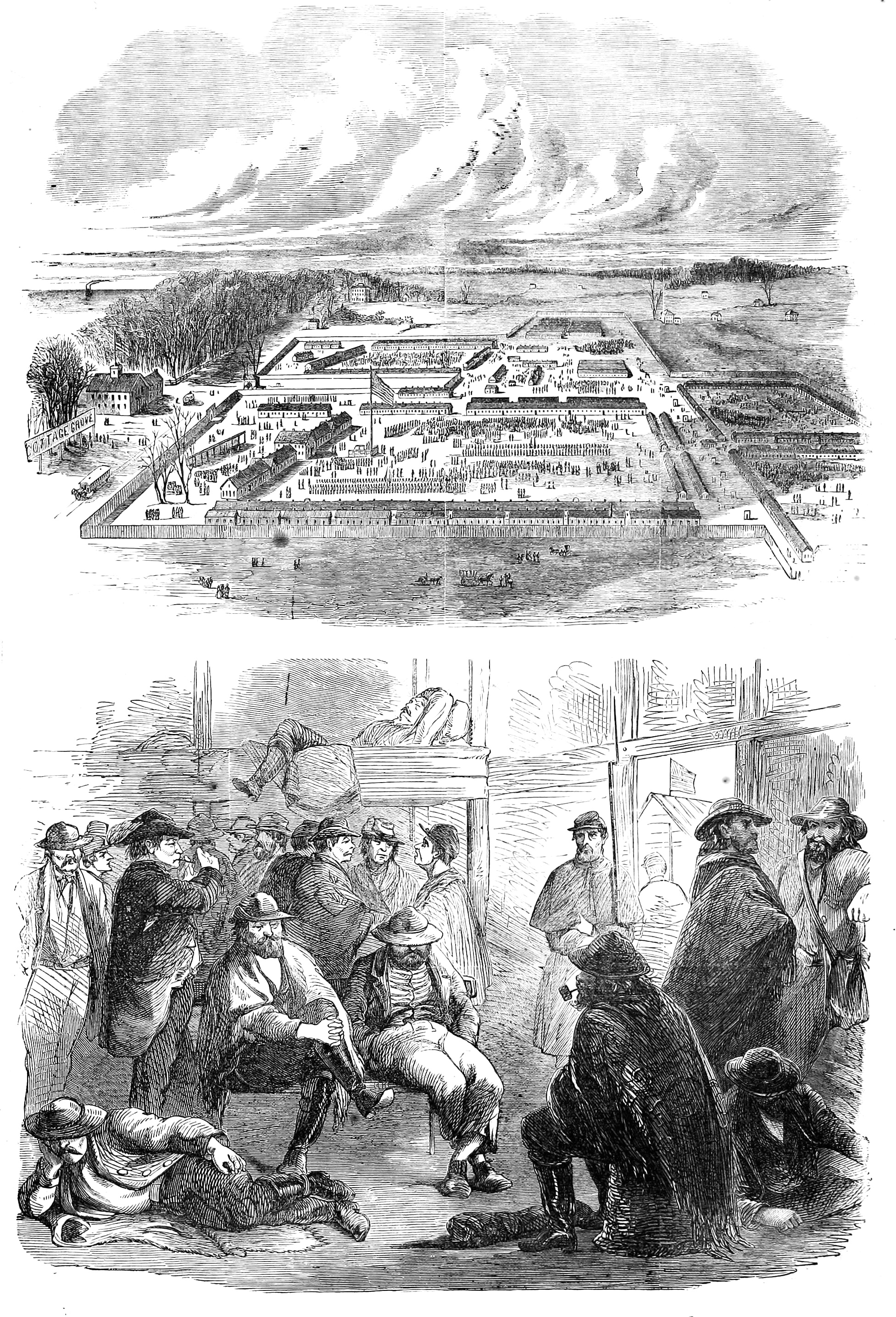
Union prisoner of war camp in Chicago during the American Civil War

Camp Douglas in Chicago, Illinois, was one of the largest Union Army prisoner-of-war camps for Confederate soldiers taken prisoner during the American Civil War. Although not alone in this distinction, it is sometimes described as "The North's Andersonville." Based south of the city on the prairie, it was also used as a training and detention camp for Union soldiers. The Union Army first used the camp in 1861 as an organizational and training camp for volunteer regiments. Camp Douglas became a prisoner-of-war camp in early 1862, but military training continued. Later that year, the Union Army used the facility as a detention camp for paroled Confederate prisoners (Union soldiers who had been captured by the Confederacy and sent north under an agreement that they would be held temporarily while formal prisoner exchanges were worked out).

Camp Douglas became a permanent prisoner-of-war camp from January 1863 through the end of the war in May 1865. In the summer and fall of 1865, the camp served as a mustering-out point for Union Army volunteer regiments. The camp was dismantled and the movable property was sold off late in the year. The land was eventually sold off and subsequently developed.

In the aftermath of the war, Camp Douglas eventually came to be noted for its poor conditions and death rate of roughly seventeen percent (about the same as other POW camps in the North). Some 4,275 Confederate prisoners were known to be re-interred from the camp cemetery to a mass grave at Oak Woods Cemetery after the war.

== Location and construction ==
=== Training Camp Douglas ===
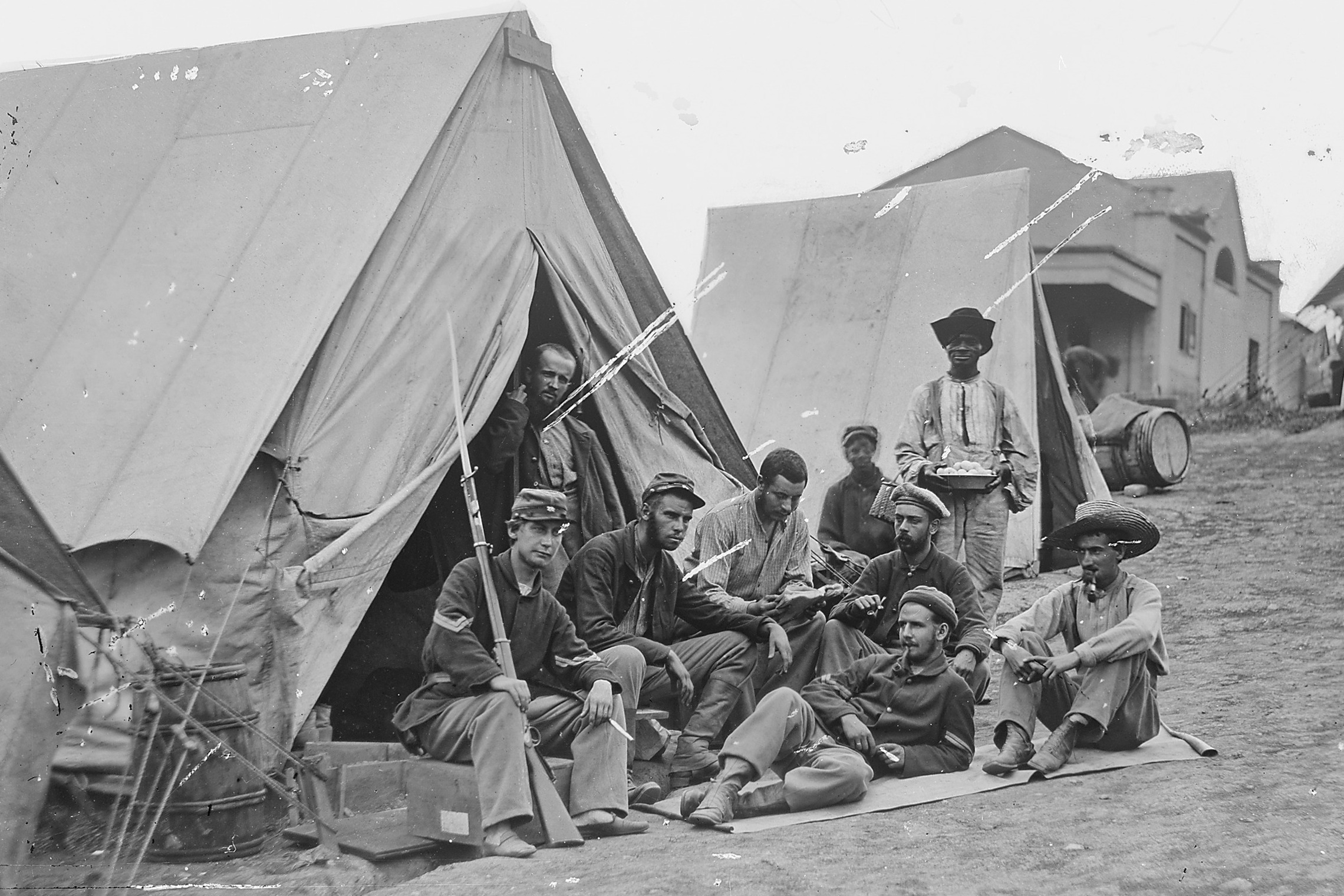
Members of the 71st New York Infantry at Camp Douglas, 1861

On April 15, 1861, the day after the U.S. Army garrison surrendered Fort Sumter to Confederate forces, President Abraham Lincoln called 75,000 State militiamen into federal service for ninety days to put down the insurrection. On May 3, 1861, President Lincoln called for 42,000 three-year volunteers, expansion of the regular army by 23,000 men and of the U.S. Navy by 18,000 sailors. Convening in July 1861, Congress retroactively approved Lincoln's actions and authorized another one million three-year volunteers.

The states and localities had to organize and equip the volunteer regiments until later in 1861, when the federal government became sufficiently organized to take over the project. Soon after President Lincoln's calls for volunteers, many volunteers from Illinois gathered in various large public and private buildings in Chicago and then overflowed into camps on the prairie on the southeast edge of the city. Senator Stephen A. Douglas owned land next to this location and had donated land just south of the camps to the original University of Chicago.

Henry Graves owned most of the property on which the camp was located. Illinois Governor Richard Yates assigned Judge Allen C. Fuller, soon to be adjutant general for the State of Illinois, to select the site for a permanent army camp at Chicago. Judge Fuller selected the site that was already in use for the makeshift camps because it was only 4 miles (6.4 km) from downtown Chicago, prairie surrounded the site, nearby Lake Michigan could provide water, and the Illinois Central Railroad ran within a few hundred yards of the site.

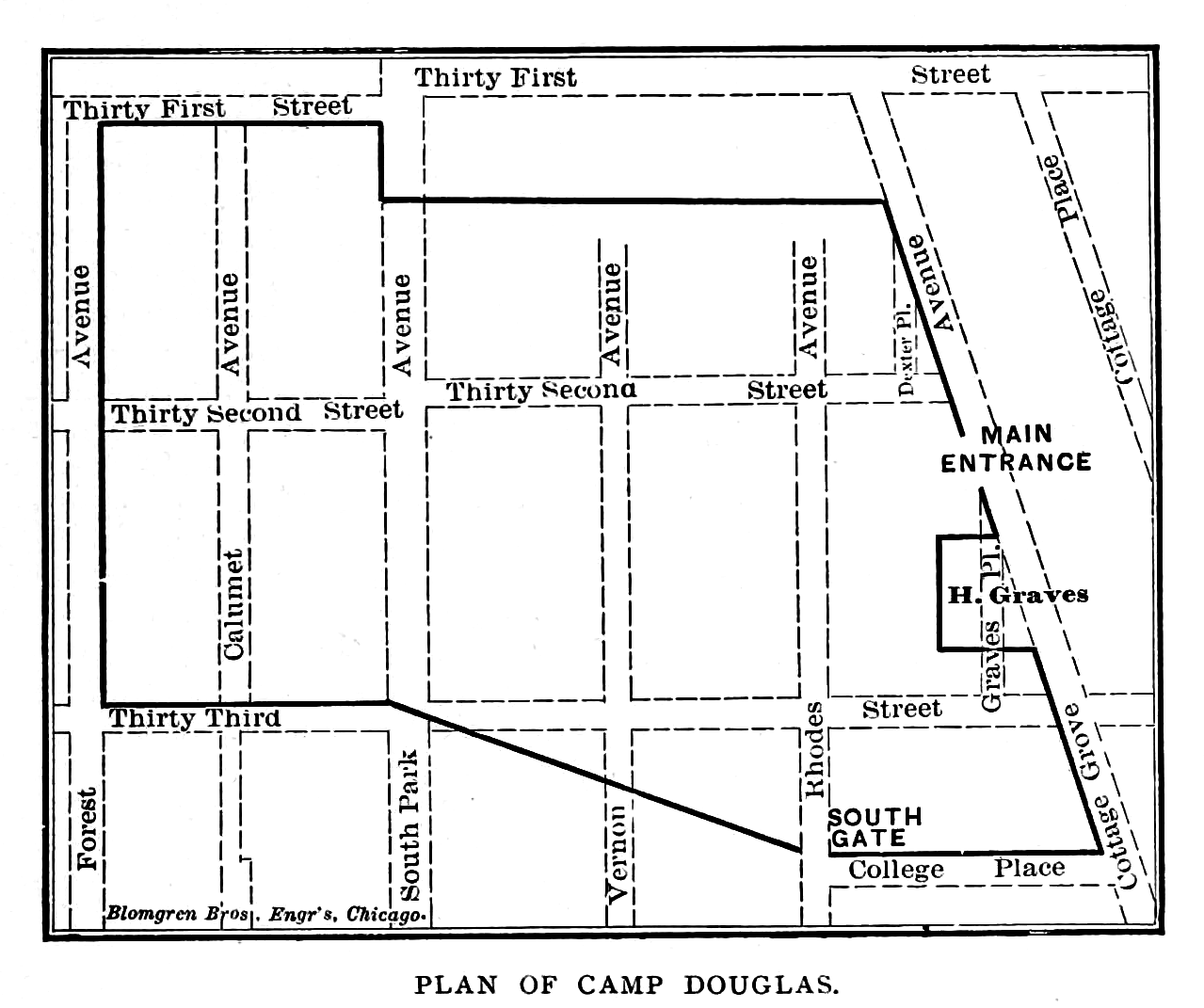
Plan of Camp Douglas, 1864–65. Dotted lines show streets as located in 1884.

Fuller was not an engineer and did not realize that the site was a poor choice for a large camp because of its wet, low-lying location. The camp lacked sewers for more than a year, and the prairie on which it was built could not absorb the waste from thousands of humans and horses. The camp flooded with each rainfall. In the winter, it was a sea of mud when the ground was not frozen. When the camp opened, only one water hydrant worked. There was a severe shortage of latrines and medical facilities from the time of the camp's initial use through the period of incarceration of the first group of Confederate prisoners in mid–1862.

The camp ran west four blocks from Cottage Grove Avenue to the present Martin Luther King Drive. Its northern boundary was what is now East 31st Street, and its southern boundary was the current East 33rd Place, which then was named College Place. A gate in the south fence of the camp provided access to the 10-acre property (4.0 ha) donated by Senator Douglas to the Old University of Chicago, which had opened in 1857 at its site on Cottage Grove Avenue and 35th Street. A smallpox hospital, four rows of garrison barracks, and an Illinois Central Railroad station were located on the former Douglas property.

The boundaries of the camp and the number, use and location of its buildings evolved during the war, but certain main divisions of the camp existed for significant periods of time. "Garrison Square" contained officers' quarters, post headquarters, a post office and parade ground. "White Oak Square" housed both Union soldiers and prisoners until late in 1863. White Oak Square included the original camp prison and the building that would become the infamous "White Oak Dungeon." Prisoners who were being punished were subject to close confinement in small, dark and dirty conditions in this "dungeon." The "dungeon" was a room 18 square feet (1.7 m^{2}), lit by one closely barred window about 18-by-8-inch (460 by 200 mm) off the floor, with entry only through a hatch about 20-inch (510 mm) square in the ceiling. The room had a damp floor and an intolerable stench from a sink (latrine) in the corner of the room.

Prison hospitals and a morgue were located just to the south of the camp in an area of 10 acres (4 ha) known as "Hospital Square". In 1863, the army built "Prison Square" or "Prisoner's Square" in the western division of the camp, as well as surgeons' quarters and warehouses. Prison Square, which was located along the south and west sides of Garrison Square, was created by combining parts of other squares with White Oak Square and separating the area from other parts of the camp with a fence. Prison Square eventually contained 64 barracks, which were 24 by 90 feet (7.3 by 27.4 m) with 20 feet (6.1 m) partitioned off as a kitchen. Designed for about 95 men each, the camp's barracks held an average of 189 men when the prison population was at its highest.

=== Command of Colonel Joseph H. Tucker ===
Governor Yates put Colonel Joseph H. Tucker, commanding the 60th Regiment, Illinois State Militia, in charge of building the camp. Yates also appointed Tucker as the camp's first commander. State militia troops called the Mechanics Fusileers, who were apprentice and journeyman carpenters, built the barracks in October and November 1861. These troops mutinied on December 18, 1861, when the State of Illinois tried to press them into service as infantry upon completion of their work on Camp Douglas. The State paid them less than they believed they were promised for their work. Regular troops had to suppress the rioting construction troops and restore order to the camp. After the Mechanics Fusileers repaired damage that they had caused to a fence, they were allowed to return home.

By November 15, 1861, Camp Douglas housed about 4,222 volunteer soldiers from 11 regiments. By February 1862, the recruits suffered 42 deaths by disease. According to George Levy's 1999 history of the camp, a total of about 40,000 Union Army recruits passed through the camp for outfitting and training before the facility was permanently converted to a prisoner-of-war camp. A 1960 history by Eisendrath estimated the number of recruits as 25,000 based on his sources at the time. Colonel Tucker's job as camp commander was not easy; he had to use increasingly hard measures to curb considerable drunk and disorderly conduct by recruits in camp. He also had to supervise their conduct and sometimes take punitive action against them for acts in the city of Chicago, where the soldiers abused pass privileges.

== Designated prisoner of war camp, 1862 ==
=== Commands of Colonel Joseph H. Tucker and Colonel Arno Voss ===
On February 16, 1862, the Union Army under then Brigadier General Ulysses S. Grant captured Fort Donelson, on the Cumberland River, and Fort Henry, on the Tennessee River, near Dover. With these victories, his forces took about 12,000 to 15,000 Confederate prisoners. The army was unprepared to handle this large group of prisoners and scrambled to find places to house them. Colonel Tucker told General Grant's superior, Major General Henry W. Halleck, that Camp Douglas could accommodate 8,000 or 9,000 prisoners, which was about the same number as the recruits it had been built for. This did not anticipate the differences required of a prison facility.

General Halleck's chief of staff at the scene in Tennessee, Brigadier General George W. Cullum, sent many prisoners to St. Louis before he received War Department instructions to direct 7,000 prisoners to Camp Douglas. This relieved pressure in Chicago, as the camp and its staff could not easily handle even the smaller number of prisoners that it received. In the event, the Illinois Central Railroad transported 4,459 of the Fort Donelson prisoners to Camp Douglas from Cairo, Illinois, where they had initially been sent.

On February 18, 1862, Colonel Arno Voss took brief temporary command of the camp until Colonel Tucker returned from Springfield, Illinois, several days later. Voss had to prepare for arrival on February 20, 1862, of the first prisoners from Fort Donelson, who found a camp but no real prison. For the first few days, they were housed in the White Oak Square section, along with newly trained Union soldiers about to depart for service at the front. The army sent sick prisoners to the camp, although it had no medical facilities at the time, and they had been advised not to do so.

On February 23, 1862, the Union troops vacated the camp, except for a small force left to guard the prisoners. This guard consisted of one regiment of 469 enlisted men and about 40 officers.

On February 25, 1862, General Halleck ordered Confederate officers to be transferred to Camp Chase, Ohio; several hundred men were pulled out and Camp Douglas became a prison camp only for enlisted men. In little more than a month, by the end of March, over 700 prisoners had died. About 77 escapes were recorded at Camp Douglas by June 1862. Historians have found no record of any escapee harming civilians.

=== Command of Colonel James A. Mulligan ===
On February 26, 1862, General Halleck ordered Colonel Tucker to report to Springfield. Colonel James A. Mulligan, a Union Army officer from Illinois, was appointed as commander of the POW camp until June 14, 1862. Between June 14 and June 19, 1862, Colonel Daniel Cameron Jr. was in charge.

The first group of prisoners were treated reasonably well under the circumstances, despite the inadequacy of the grounds, barracks, and sewer and water systems. Sewers were not authorized until June 1863 for the camp, and took time to be completed. Initially the prisoners received enough to eat, with cooking stoves and utensils to aid in preparation, and clothing. A good sutler store was set up.

The Union Army sent three tons of corn meal and large quantities of blankets, clothing, shoes and eating utensils to the camp on March 1, 1862. Sickness and death among the prisoners, and even among some guards, reached epidemic levels. Frozen hydrants led to a water shortage. One in eight of the prisoners from Fort Donelson died of pneumonia or various diseases. After April 12, 1862, Colonel Mulligan finally permitted only physicians and ministers to visit the prisoners to reduce exposure to illness.

Colonel Mulligan cooperated with local residents who provided a relief committee for the prisoners when they learned of the camp's poor conditions. Mulligan apparently showed some sympathy for the prisoners because he had been treated with respect by Confederate General Sterling Price when Mulligan's regiment had been captured and paroled at the First Battle of Lexington, Missouri, on September 19, 1861. Mulligan was exchanged on October 30, 1861.

After the Union Army victory at the battle of Shiloh and capture of Island No. 10 in the spring of 1862, Camp Douglas housed 8,962 Confederate prisoners. Conditions at the camp deteriorated with the overcrowding and escapes increased. Some escapes were aided by Southern sympathizers in Chicago and others were facilitated by lax administration by Colonel Mulligan and the guards.

=== Roles of officers at Dept. of Army ===
To try to manage the great number of prisoners being captured during the war, the Department of the Army set up the Office of the Commissary-General of Prisoners and, starting in June 1862, this position reported directly to the Secretary of War. In August 1862, Lieutenant Colonel William Hoffman, newly released from a Confederate POW camp, took over that office and served in it through the war, setting national policy related to treatment of prisoners, prison camps, and conditions for exchanging or releasing prisoners.

Based on reports he received, Colonel Hoffman soon realized that Camp Douglas was inadequate for a prison camp. He proposed construction of two-story insulated barracks at the camp, but the Army approved maintenance or construction of only the thin single-story structures, which had been constructed for short-term use by volunteer trainees. In 1862, Colonel Mulligan, Colonel Tucker and Colonel Hoffman all tried to get funds to improve the sewers and to build new barracks, but without immediate success. Quartermaster General Montgomery C. Meigs said construction of a new sewer system would be too "extravagant". It was not until June 1863 that he authorized the construction of the sewers, after being pressured by leading members of the U.S. Sanitary Commission.

Twentieth-century historians have criticized local commanders and Hoffman for failing to secure a proper balanced diet for the prisoners. A better diet could have helped prevent the onset or spread of disease, including scurvy, which resulted from a known vitamin deficiency.

=== Second command of Colonel Joseph H. Tucker ===
Although still with the Illinois militia and not in the federal army, Colonel Tucker returned to command the camp on June 19, 1862. To deal with local civilian sympathizers who might be aiding escapes, Colonel Tucker declared martial law on July 12, 1862. When twenty-five prisoners escaped on July 23, 1862, Tucker arrested several citizens who he believed aided the escapees. In addition, he brought in Chicago police to search the camp. This action caused much lasting animosity from the prisoners because the police confiscated many of the prisoners' valuables. The police also confiscated five pistols and many bullets. Twenty of the escapees were recaptured within two weeks.

In the summer of 1862, Henry Whitney Bellows, president of the U.S. Sanitary Commission, wrote the following to Colonel Hoffman after visiting the camp:

Sir, the amount of standing water, unpoliced grounds, of foul sinks, of unventilated and crowded barracks, of general disorder, of soil reeking miasmatic accretions, of rotten bones and emptying of camp kettles, is enough to drive a sanitarian to despair. I hope that no thought will be entertained of mending matters. The absolute abandonment of the spot seems to be the only judicious course. I do not believe that any amount of drainage would purge that soil loaded with accumulated filth or those barracks fetid with two stories of vermin and animal exhalations. Nothing but fire can cleanse them.

Hoffman already had requested improvements in the camp, but he kept the report secret because he did not want to take a position contrary to that taken by any superior, such as Quartermaster General Meigs. Not only prisoners suffered, but one of Colonel Tucker's sons, who served with him at the camp, became ill and died in the summer of 1862.

Conditions at the camp improved that summer as almost all the prisoners left by September 1862. About one thousand prisoners took an oath of allegiance to the United States and were freed. All prisoners who were not too ill to travel were exchanged due to implementation of the July 22, 1862 Dix–Hill prisoner cartel between the Union and Confederate armies. By October 6, 1862, the few remaining prisoners who had been too ill to leave earlier also were gone. Through September 1862, 980 Confederate prisoners and 240 Union Army trainees and guards had died at Camp Douglas, almost all from disease.

== Training camp and camp for detained Union parolees, 1862 ==
In the fall of 1862, Camp Douglas again briefly became a training camp for Union Army volunteers. The Union Army then used the camp for its most unusual purpose.

=== Union Army parolees under command of Brigadier General Daniel Tyler ===
Union soldiers who were paroled after their capture by Confederate Lieutenant General Thomas J. "Stonewall" Jackson at the Battle of Harpers Ferry, Virginia (later West Virginia) on September 15, 1862, were sent to Camp Douglas for temporary detention. Under the terms of the prisoner cartel, they had to await formal exchange before they could leave the camp. These 8,000 paroled Union soldiers began to arrive at Camp Douglas on September 28, 1862. Brigadier General Daniel Tyler relieved Colonel Tucker of command of the camp. Under Tyler's command, these Union soldiers had to live under similar conditions to those endured by the Confederate prisoners from Fort Donelson. The conditions were worse because the camp had become filthy and even more run down during its occupancy by the prisoners. The paroled soldiers were fortunate to have only about a two-month stay. They were able to tolerate the conditions somewhat better than the previous Confederate prisoners could because the Union parolees were more warmly dressed and in better physical condition. The damp conditions and bad food still took their toll. By November, forty soldiers of the 126th New York Volunteer Infantry Regiment had died and about another sixty were ill with fevers.

Under these oppressive conditions, the Union Army parolees became mutinous, set fires, and made many attempted escapes. On October 23, 1862, General Tyler brought in regular U.S. troops to stop parolee riots. Secretary of War Edwin Stanton also ordered Tyler to relax his strict discipline, which helped calm the parolees. Most of the prisoner of war exchanges between the Union and Confederate armies under the cartel were completed by the end of November 1862. All the parolees left the camp by the end of that month except for Colonel Daniel Cameron and his 65th Illinois Volunteer Infantry Regiment, who were held until April 19, 1863, and put to work as guards. Thirty-five men of this regiment also died of disease at the camp during their confinement.

== Prison camp, 1863–1865 ==
=== Command of Brigadier General Jacob Ammen and Second and Third Commands of Colonel Daniel Cameron ===
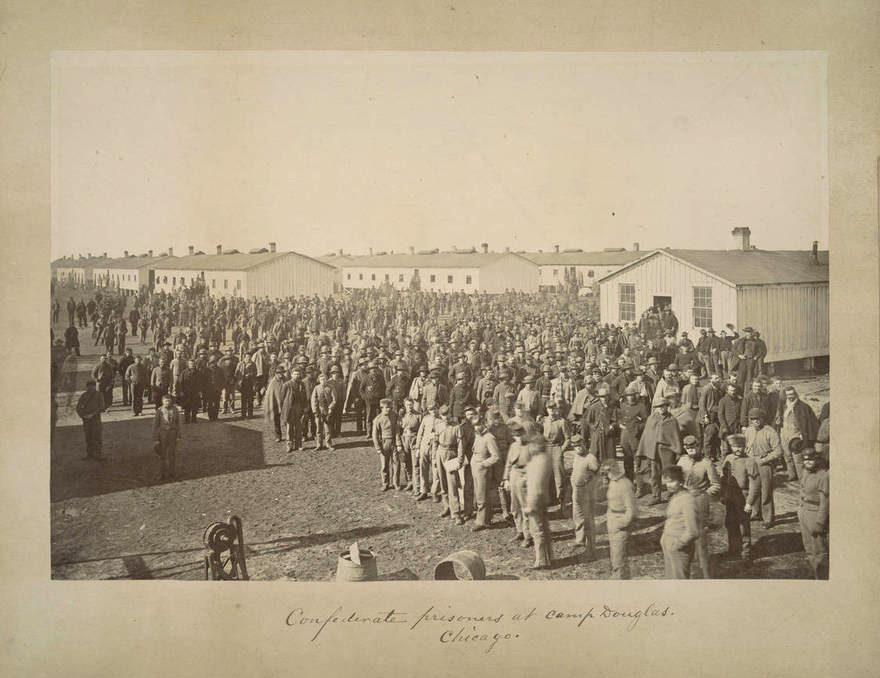
Confederate prisoners at Camp Douglas, Chicago, circa 1863

On November 20, 1862, Colonel Daniel Cameron, who had been in brief command of the camp earlier in the year, and had been among the parolees, again took command of the camp.

On January 6, 1863, the Union Army ordered Brigadier General Jacob Ammen to take command of Camp Douglas, as Confederate prisoners from the Battle of Stones River were being sent to the camp. About 1,500 poorly clothed and generally physically unfit Confederate prisoners arrived at the camp on January 26, 1863. About 1,300 other prisoners arrived the next day and 1,500 more arrived on January 30, 1863, after the Union Army captured Fort Hindman (Arkansas Post). During January a group of Lake Superiour Chippewa Chiefs were shown the camp en route to Washington D.C. The ranking Chief was Naw-gaw-nab (Foremost sitter) of the Fond-du-Lac band. He lectured the rebels saying: "you have been fighting to break up this government like the bloody Sioux" plus a good deal more.

On February 2, 1863, General Ammen reported that many prisoners were too sick to endure conditions at the camp. Neither the Army nor the War Department made any immediate improvements at the camp. That month, 387 of the prisoners died. This was the highest mortality rate in any prison camp for any month during the war. Since the prisoners had just arrived at the camp during the previous few weeks, these prisoners likely were already in weakened and poor physical condition at the time. Temperatures that month reportedly were as low as −20 °F (−29 °C). Smallpox and other diseases were widespread among these prisoners. By March 1863, nineteen prisoners and nineteen guards had died from smallpox. Smallpox later was spread to northern cities and into Virginia by several infected prisoners who traveled together with many other prisoners through several large cities by train and steamer to City Point, Virginia, for exchange. Most of the prisoners were exchanged by April 3, 1863, under this later prisoner cartel.

By April 27, 1863, the final death toll from this group of prisoners was 784. Levy suggests that more than 300 deaths must have been covered up at the time, which would have made 784 a significant undercount of prisoner deaths to date. By the time these early 1863 prisoners departed from the camp, sources suggest that between 1,400 and 1,700 prisoners likely had died at Camp Douglas. But official records showed only 615 prisoner deaths to this date. The majority of the deaths at the camp had been caused by typhoid fever and pneumonia. The prisoners arrived in a weakened condition, making them vulnerable to disease; at the camp they suffered filthy conditions, an inadequate sewer system, harshly cold weather, and lack of sufficient heat and clothing. A few prisoners were wounded or killed by guards who saw them step over the "dead line" near the boundaries of the camp or commit minor offenses, but such incidents occurred infrequently. Despite these hardships, survivors from this group of prisoners who wrote about their experiences generally stated that they were treated humanely at Camp Douglas.

General Ammen was ordered to Springfield to command the District of Illinois on April 13, 1863. Colonel Cameron took command of the camp for a week.

=== Interim Command of Captain J. S. Putnam ===
For about two weeks, Captain John C. Phillips was the senior officer at the camp and in command. Between May 12, 1863, and August 18, 1863, Captain J. S. Putnam was in charge of the almost empty camp, which then held only about fifty prisoners.

The army made some improvements to the camp and planned others in the summer of 1863 because it intended to return the camp to its original purpose of housing and training new Union Army recruits. But, Union victories during the summer of 1863 produced a large number of prisoners. Camp Douglas was returned to use as a POW camp from this time until the end of the war.

=== Command of Colonel Charles V. DeLand ===
The first of the new Confederate prisoners, 558 militant guerrilla raiders who had been under the command of Brigadier General John Hunt Morgan, arrived at the camp on August 20, 1863. Colonel Charles V. DeLand, who had been a prisoner of the Confederates earlier in the war as a captain in the 9th Michigan Infantry Regiment and would be again after being wounded at the Battle of Peeble’s Farm during the Siege of Petersburg and who had commanded the 1st Michigan Sharpshooters in the pursuit of Morgan, was ordered to take command of the camp on August 18, 1863. Colonel DeLand was appointed commandant of the camp because he was the senior officer of the regiment guarding the prisoners as they were brought there. By September 26, 1863, a total of 4,234 Confederate prisoners were being held at Camp Douglas. On October 9, 1863, Dr. A. M. Clark, medical director of prisoners, inspected the camp and found the number of prisoners had risen to 6,085, with only 978 Union soldiers in the garrison to guard them.

Colonel DeLand tried to impose discipline on the disorderly camp but was frustrated by its poor condition and corrupt guards, including especially those from his own regiment. Because only two water hydrants were available to the prisoners, they had to wait in the cold for hours to get water. Open sinks (latrines), or sewers, ran through the middle of the camp. The rundown buildings provided inadequate shelter. Hospital capacity, with 120 beds for prisoners and 50 beds for guards, was seriously inadequate. The post chapel was converted into hospital space, but there was still insufficient capacity for all the sick prisoners and guards.

During this period, in retaliation for treatment of Union prisoners by Confederates, an undisclosed official in the high command ordered the cook stoves, which also provided heat, replaced by 40-US-gallon (150 L) boilers. These large pots provided little heat for the buildings and destroyed the quality of the food cooked in them.

DeLand put infantry prisoners to work building a new sewer system for the camp. Prisoners were not required to work but many volunteered, probably in part because they were paid in chewing tobacco and clothing. He also had them begin construction on a more substantial stockade. After criticism from Dr. Clark and Colonel Hoffman, who reviewed reports on the camps, in mid-October 1863 DeLand provided the prisoners with cooking utensils, one hundred barrels of lime, twenty-four white-wash brushes, and a quantity of lumber for repairs and washing of buildings. On October 25, 1863, DeLand ordered that prisoners clean their quarters regularly, but overcrowding seems to have made it impossible to keep the barracks sanitary. Construction of the new sewers was finished by November 6, 1863, but this new system had inadequate 3-inch (76 mm) pipes and ran along only two sides of the camp. Additional improvements at this time included laying of water pipes and the near completion of fences for the first time since the camp became a prisoner detention facility.

Prisoners who tried to escape were placed in White Oak Dungeon, an 18-square-foot (1.7 m^{2}) space under the guard room, which had only one small window and was permeated with an intolerable stench. In his October 1863 inspection, Dr. Clark found 24 prisoners in this space, which he described as suitable for no more than 3 or 4. Morgan's men attempted many escapes because of the weak security force. Twenty-six prisoners escaped from the dungeon on October 26, 1863. More than 150 prisoners escaped during DeLand's period of command of the camp.

President Lincoln's brother-in-law, Ninian Wirt Edwards, a Union Army captain, contracted with vendors to supply meat and other rations to military camps. Their subcontractors delivered poor quality rations directly to prisoners at Camp Douglas and not to the camp commissary. The garrison also received poor quality meat from these subcontractors. News of this developed into a scandal that carried over to the administration of the next camp commander.

DeLand was pressured to increase security but had several factors working against him: the layout of camp, guards from the Invalid Corps who were unable to perform efficiently, and the quartering of prisoners and guards together at White Oak Square. Together with the ease by which money could be sent or brought to prisoners, these factors contributed to corruption and bribery. On one occasion, DeLand lined up the prisoners from the 8th Kentucky Cavalry Regiment when a tunnel was found under their barracks and ordered guards to shoot "if any sat down." One prisoner was killed and two were wounded by the guards before the line-up was concluded. Finally, fifteen to twenty men confessed to being the main diggers and were sent to White Oak Dungeon. Later, DeLand hanged three men by their thumbs so they partly had to tiptoe for an hour, allegedly because they threatened an informer. One of these men fainted and another threw up on himself. DeLand imposed the same punishment at least one more time.

DeLand ordered men out of barracks for long periods of time while searches for tunnels were conducted. He ordered that cook stoves be extinguished when "Taps" was played at sunset, which was a hardship during cold weather. Despite these measures, about 100 of Morgan's men escaped through a tunnel on December 3, 1863. Most were recaptured. DeLand ordered guards to shout only one challenge to prisoners who came too near a fence or outside a barracks at night before firing if they did not obey. Confederate prisoner T. D. Henry suggests that most shooting incidents at Camp Douglas occurred during DeLand's term as commandant. To discourage escape attempts, prisoners who went to use latrines at night had to leave their clothes in the barracks regardless of the weather.

On November 9, 1863, Colonel Banjamin J. Sweet, commander of the Eighth Regiment of the Invalid Corps guarding the camp, challenged Colonel DeLand's command of the camp because Sweet's commission arguably pre-dated DeLand's. A few days later, DeLand reacted quickly to prevent escapes when a fire destroyed 300 feet (91 m) of barracks, fences and the sutler's shop on November 11, 1863. This worked in his favor. Colonel Hoffman ordered that Colonel DeLand remain as commander. Hoffman ordered DeLand to cut rations at this time, which increased the hardships of the prisoners, although they still seem to have had a sufficient quantity of food daily.

Because of the serious fire damage, Hoffman decided to go to Chicago to inspect the camp himself, arriving on November 15, 1863. DeLand bribed prisoners with whiskey to clean up the camp for Hoffman's visit. On November 18, 1863, Brigadier General William W. Orme, who reported directly to Secretary of War Edwin Stanton, showed up to inspect the camp in preparation for Orme taking over command. Orme noted that the garrison of 876 men was dangerously small and that sixty-one men had escaped in the preceding three months. Chicago doctors who inspected the prison in 1863 called Camp Douglas an "extermination camp." It quickly became the largest Confederate burial ground outside of the South.f>

The Army ordered sutler stores at prison camps shut down on December 1, 1863, in retaliation for reported Confederate mistreatment of Union prisoners. The store at Camp Douglas was closed on December 12. After a successful tunneling escape on December 3, Colonel DeLand ordered all floors torn out of barracks, to be replaced by dirt even with the floor joist. This resulted in conditions that increased sickness and mortality. The garrison also tore out partitions in the barracks. DeLand confiscated warm coats, possibly to prevent escapes but as likely in retaliation for past escapes and attempts. On December 17, 1863, the prison camp officials closed the barber shop and newsstand, and stopped sales of stamps, envelopes and writing paper, likely also in retaliation for the major escape attempt. When Sergeant-Major Oscar Cliett of the 55th Georgia Infantry Regiment reported to DeLand that his men rejected an offer of amnesty if they joined the Union Navy because they could not swim, DeLand had him placed in the dungeon for twenty-one days. Despite these harsh actions, DeLand also worked to free fifty underage prisoners who he discovered were between the ages of 14 and 17 The Army did not free them.

=== Command of Brigadier General William W. Orme ===
On December 23, 1863, Brigadier General William W. Orme relieved Colonel DeLand as commander of the camp; Colonel DeLand remained at the camp until March 11, 1864, as commander of the garrison. Orme had arranged to increase the garrison; about 400 reinforcements for the guards from the 15th regiment of the Invalid Corps under Colonel James C. Strong arrived the next day. On March 18, 1864, in an effort to improve morale, the Union Army renamed the Invalid Corps as the Veteran Reserve Corps.

General Orme tried to handle the continuing scandal over the poor quality beef as well as other administrative problems that he inherited. After investigation, he exonerated Ninian Edwards and his vendors, and placed the blame for the meat problem solely on sub-contractors. Despite Edwards' exoneration and his relationship with the President, the Army took control of subsistence at the camp away from Edwards on January 27, 1864. Edwards, a captain in the Union Army, was reassigned as food commissary and treasurer of the prison fund in March 1864.

A blizzard and temperatures of −18 °F (−28 °C) occurred on January 1, 1864. Some prisoners who escaped at this time were found frozen to death nearby. On January 8, 1864, General Orme instituted a program of armed guard patrols. Some prisoners reported killing and eating rats after a prison kitchen was demolished on January 10, 1864, and food shortages resulted, but the reports appear to be dubious. General Orme obtained some Union army overcoats outside of channels and distributed them to prisoners. But when Colonel Hoffman learned of his actions, he reprimanded him for proceeding outside regulations.

Dr. Edward D. Kittoe of the surgeon general's office inspected the camp on January 18, 1864. He found the severely overcrowded barracks deep in filth and mud, and swarming with vermin due to the lack of flooring. Cooking was deficient and garbage littered the streets. Old sinks (latrines) were not sealed properly and waste was seeping to the surface. Dr. Kittoe gave high marks to the hospital but noted that 250 sick men remained in barracks because the hospital's 234 beds were full. He found that thirty-six percent of the prisoners were ill, and fifty-seven prisoners had died in December 1863. The guards also were suffering from the poor conditions at the camp, with twenty-nine percent ill and six deaths among them in December 1863. Dr. Kittoe concluded the camp was unfit for use, but it remained in use.

On January 20, 1864, prisoners began to be transferred from White Oak Square to Prisoner's Square. The construction added 40 acres (16 ha) to the camp. The barracks had to be moved on rollers. When unpaid prisoners refused to do further work on the move, they were forced to use makeshift shelters rather than being allowed to sleep in the partially moved buildings. All the prisoners were not moved from White Oak Square until April 1864.

Thanks to another inspection of the camp by Dr. Clark on February 4, 1864, flooring was restored to the barracks. Clark found that the number of working hydrants for supplying water to the camp had been increased from three to twelve. By February 27, 1864, floors were laid in all barracks and the structures were raised five feet off the ground on thick timber legs. This not only improved the sanitary condition of the barracks but helped prevent tunneling. During the move, many of the barracks and kitchens had been placed closer to the fences, which was found to encourage tunneling efforts. Upon the discovery of these escape efforts, prison officials moved the barracks further from the stockade walls, and reduced the attempts to escape by tunnels.

On March 11, 1864, Colonel DeLand and his regiment were sent to the front. DeLand was wounded four times after his time at Camp Douglas, at the Spotsylvania, Battle of the Crater, and Battle of Peebles Farm. He was taken prisoner by the Confederates at Peebles Farm but was not mistreated despite his command of Camp Douglas. His Confederate captors treated his wounds. DeLand was exchanged and discharged from the army on February 4, 1865. On March 13, 1867, Congress confirmed the award to DeLand of the honorary grade of brevet brigadier general to rank from March 13, 1865.

=== Garrison command of Colonel James C. Strong ===
The War Department appointed Colonel James C. Strong as the new head of the garrison. His command began during General Orme's command of the camp and continued through Colonel Sweet's command. At the beginning of his duty, Strong had only about 650 healthy men to guard almost 6,000 prisoners. Strong prepared new prison rolls and found that 84 prisoners were missing. He was the first garrison commander to force prisoners to work, but work details were restricted to four hours per day. Between January and March 1864, when Colonel Strong had only 550 men available for guard duty, thirty-two escapes were made from the camp. Strong realized placement of the buildings in Prisoner's Square contributed to the problem and had them moved away from the fences and closer to the middle of the square. The fence separating Prisoner's Square from the rest of the camp was completed on March 22, 1864. About this time General Orme attached many bright oil-burning lamps to the fence to illuminate the area at night.

A new sutler's store, with high prices, was established at the camp around April 1, 1864. Construction of a very advanced additional 180-bed hospital, including a mess room, kitchen, hot water, adjoining laundry and flush toilets, was completed on April 10, 1864. Yet, the hospital facilities were still too small for all the needs of the prisoners and guards. Despite the need, the camp added only 70 more beds in two old buildings. The separate smallpox hospital remained in a converted cavalry stable until it was moved to a site called Adele Grove, one-half mile south of the camp on the south side of the University of Chicago, facing Cottage Grove. The expanded facility began to operate on April 15, 1864.

Strict discipline and abuse of the prisoners increased at this time. Colonel Strong gave more power to patrols and put each barracks under control of a sergeant, two corporals and five privates. Some of these individuals were vindictive and even dangerous. On April 10, 1864, guards made some prisoners stand on barrels for purchasing whiskey from a guard. Others were made to wear signs noting various offenses. A new dungeon about 20 feet (6.1 m) and 7 feet (2.1 m) high, with two small air holes, was built in Prisoner's Square. Three men spent a night there for climbing a roof to watch horse racing. Punishment through extensive use of ball and chain, using a 32-pound (15 kg) cannonball chained to a prisoner's leg, began. Some prisoners received this punishment for reneging on a request to take the oath of allegiance to the United States.

On March 17, 1864, the War Department ordered that any shooting incident at a prison camp must be investigated by a board of officers. Thereafter only eight shooting incidents were reported at Camp Douglas: six in connection with escape attempts, one for urinating in the street and one for crossing the deadline. Two prisoners in a barracks were wounded when the shots missed the prisoner who had crossed the deadline.

On April 16, 1864, Lt. Colonel John F. Marsh of the inspector general's office inspected the camp. He found lax control of sutlers, prisoners being paid tobacco for garbage collection by a private garbage contractor, barracks in poor condition, with floors ripped up, filthy bedding, grounds wet and poor policing.

On April 17, 1864, General Ulysses S. Grant canceled all prisoner exchange negotiations and said they would not resume unless they included black Union prisoners held by Confederates. This led to a several months-long impasse in prisoner exchanges until shortly after negotiations were resumed on January 21, 1865. Both Union and Confederate armies had to house many additional prisoners for longer periods of time than in the past. When the prisoner cartel had been operating, many prisoners could expect to be exchanged within a few months.

On April 27, 1864, without authority, General Orme fired Colonel Strong as commander of the garrison and installed Colonel Benjamin J. Sweet. Two days later, when Orme was ordered to correct the problems at the camp, he resigned. He was also reported to be ill at the time.

=== Command of Colonel Benjamin J. Sweet ===
On May 2, 1864, the War Department appointed Colonel Benjamin Sweet as commander of the camp. He had been at the camp for seven months and wanted the post. (Some historians now doubt his claim to have been wounded at the battle of Perryville, because he claimed that two wounds, including a chest wound, were treated by ordinary soldiers, not doctors. On the other hand, other sources say that his right arm was rendered useless by the wounds.) In any event, Sweet transferred to the Invalid Corps.

Sweet proved to be a strict disciplinarian who increased punishments and cut rations. This latter action was in line with revised War Department policy in 1864. He proved to be better organized in most respects and a better administrator than his predecessors.

Colonel Sweet reinstated Colonel Strong as commander of the garrison. Sweet strained relations with Colonel Hoffman in the national office by refusing to live at the camp and by moving his office to downtown Chicago. His 12-year-old daughter, Ada, was living with him, apparently to act as his secretary. Confederate prisoner T. D. Henry noted that Sweet appointed "a fiend name Captain Webb [Wells] Sponable as inspector of prisoners. From this time forward the darkest leaf in the legends of tyranny could not possibly contain a greater number of punishments." Sponable's patrol force of 2 lieutenants, 10 sergeants, 20 corporals and 38 privates continued to regulate rations, cooking arrangements and work details. A 5-man squad was on constant patrol in Prisoner's Square. As Sweet was not on site, prisoners felt that the garrison soldiers would not be held accountable for their treatment. For some prisoners, the patrols were a benefit because they protected prisoners from each other. The patrols cracked down on a few guards whose actions were out of line.

Sweet changed the rations by eliminating hominy, which he said was wasted, and candles, which he believed were used in aid of tunneling. Using forced labor to build new units, he placed the increasing number of prisoners' barracks on parallel streets. Sweet had the prisoners searched daily for contraband to be sure prisoners had no cash to bribe guards, but such hidden money was not found. During a prison-wide roll call on May 24, 1864, the guards confiscated excess clothing from the prisoners' barracks.

The topsoil at the camp had become so eroded that guards had to wear goggles as protection against blowing sand and dust, and prisoners had to almost close their eyes to move around. On May 27, 1864, Sweet ordered two more sinks built in Prisoner's Square. He had more than six thousand feet of pine board delivered for repairs to barracks. He also tried to force prisoners to keep the camp in repair.

Prisoners attacked the fence in an escape attempt on June 1 but were thwarted, mainly by guards on the ground using revolvers. Those on the fence lines were armed with rifles that might not have worked. No prisoners were killed in the incident.

As the number of prisoners at the camp increased in the summer of 1864, the War Department again reduced rations, in retaliation for the Confederates reducing rations for Union prisoners. Rations reportedly no longer lasted quite as long as the period for which they were allotted. A few prisoners reported that prisoners resorted to eating rats. Guards punished anyone caught taking bones from the garbage by tying the bone in the prisoner's mouth and making him crawl around like a dog. As the length of confinements increased due to the lack of prisoner exchanges, more fights between prisoners arose. Other prisoners usually broke them up before guards intervened. Work details were still required.

By June 1864, guards had set up "the mule" or "wooden horse," a sawhorse-type device set about 4 feet (1.2 m) off the ground, later raised to 15 feet (4.6 m). It had a thin, almost sharp, edge and was used as punishment; prisoners were forced to sit on it. Prisoners used their hands to brace themselves when on the device, but a Confederate prisoner reported seeing men forced to sit on it until they fainted and fell off. Sometimes weights were tied to the prisoner's feet. The device, which was outside, was used in any type of weather. A guard was also required to sit on the device as punishment for an unrecorded offense. In line with War Department instructions, the post surgeon refused Confederate surgeons' requests to send medicine for free to the prisoners.

== The 1864 'Camp Douglas Conspiracy' to break out prisoners ==
The Camp Douglas Conspiracy, thought to have been a serious plot to assault the camp and free the prisoners, was supposed to have come to fruition on November 8, 1864. Historians still do not agree on whether the plot was real or a hoax devised by people seeking advantage from misinformation. Attorney and historian George Levy maintains the "conspiracy" began as a con aimed at Confederate agents that evolved into a hoax exploited by Colonel Sweet for his own advantage. Levy wrote that believing in the Camp Douglas conspiracy was a matter of faith: Confederate agents thought they had created a workable plot, and Colonel Sweet made their dream come true. On the other hand, Kelly wrote that Sweet seemed to believe the plot to be real. Eisendrath also treated the plot as real. Writing at a time closer to the event, Bross also describes the plot as real.

In the spring of 1864, the Confederate government did send agents to Canada to plan prison escape attempts and attacks in the North. One of the agents, Captain Thomas Hines, believed that he could raise a force of about 5,000 Confederate sympathizers in Chicago to free the prisoners from Camp Douglas. On the other hand, no evidence of elementary planning of the details for the assault before Hines began to plan the operation, in mid-August 1864, has been found. He soon found that he had only 25 untrained volunteers for the difficult mission.

He apparently gave up on the scheme as the Democratic convention in Chicago, which was supposed to provide volunteers and cover for execution of the plan, ended at the end of August. Sweet kept the tale alive, however, and told superiors he was about to crush a dangerous uprising. As Sweet made no effort to prevent the 196th Pennsylvania Infantry from leaving the camp 11 days earlier, Levy thinks that his report to superiors was self-serving.

On November 6, 1864, Brigadier General John Cook in Springfield, Illinois authorized Colonel Sweet to arrest two Confederate agents at Chicago. Sweet sent a message by hand delivery, not by telegraph, to Cook that said that Colonel Marmaduke of the Rebel army and other officers were in town plotting to release the prisoners. Sweet claimed that he had to act immediately and arrest two or three prominent citizens who were actively involved in the plot.

Without a warrant, Sweet's men searched the home of Charles Walsh, leader of the "Sons of Liberty," who were sympathetic with the South, and discovered a cache of guns and ammunition. The arms were not found in the quantity needed to arm 2,000 men, as the plot supposedly called for. Sweet effectively extended martial law from the few blocks surrounding the camp to the entire city of Chicago. Sweet stated that 106 men were arrested, including Walsh and Judge Buckner Stith Morris of the Circuit Court of Illinois, treasurer of the Sons.

Over half of those arrested were promptly released. Another search on November 11 turned up seventy-eight more guns. Only six of eighteen Camp Douglas prisoners from Chicago were arrested on November 6, while the others were arrested between November 12 and 16. Sweet found only fifty-one of the sixty-nine Chicagoans on his list of 108 suspects on November 6. The other Chicagoans were seized later and the other suspects were arrested outside Chicago in their home counties. Sweet's claim to have arrested leaders of the Clingmann gang of southern Illinois draft resisters and Southern sympathizers is not borne out by the records. Sweet confined those he arrested in a church before moving them to Camp Douglas.

Secretary of War Stanton approved of Sweet's action; Generals Hooker and Cook sent him reinforcements, and Governor Yates put the Chicago militia at Sweet's disposal. Sweet then had about 2,000 troops available. Sweet arrested five more members of the Sons of Liberty on November 14, including Richard T. Semmes. He was not the brother of the Confederate Admiral, Raphael Semmes, as Sweet asserted at the time. He also arrested Vincent Marmaduke, who was not the Confederate colonel, according to Levy. After the release of a number of the suspects, the total number of leaders and foot soldiers in the alleged plot to assault the camp and free the prisoners was sixty-six men. The army agreed with Sweet's advice to try those arrested before a military commission but ordered that this trial take place in Cincinnati, not in Chicago. Sweet did not arrest Mary Morris, the young pro-Southern wife of Judge Morris, but the prosecutor, Major Henry L. Burnett, ordered her arrested. She was not charged, likely as part of a deal in return for her testimony. Her later self-incrimination led to the exoneration of her husband.

Sweet's main informer and agent, John T. Shanks, a Confederate prisoner who was a former Morgan's Raider and a convicted criminal, testified against the defendants. Sweet kept the pretense that Shanks was not his agent and lied that Judge Morris had aided Shanks to escape from Camp Douglas. In a recently discovered letter of March 29, 1865, from Sweet to Hoffman, Sweet told Hoffman of using Shanks and asked for approval of one year's pay from the prison fund for him. No record of a reply from Hoffman has been found.

Shanks' criminal past was disclosed to the military commission, but it still convicted many of the defendants. On December 12, 1864, President Lincoln awarded Sweet the rank of brevet brigadier general United States Volunteers to rank from December 20, 1864, and the U.S. Senate confirmed the award on February 14, 1865. Shanks was recruited as a "Galvanized Yankee" in 1865. As a captain commanding Company I of the 6th U.S. Volunteer Infantry, he was the only former Confederate prisoner commissioned as an officer.

The first use recorded in the Oxford English Dictionary of the phrase, to hell in a hand basket, was in The Great North-Western Conspiracy in All Its Startling Details, an 1865 account by I. Windslow Ayer of events surrounding the Camp Douglas Conspiracy. Ayer alleges that, at an August meeting of the Order of the Sons of Liberty, Judge Morris (noted above) said: "Thousands of our best men were prisoners in Camp Douglas, and if once at liberty would 'send abolitionists to hell in a hand basket.'"

== Final months ==
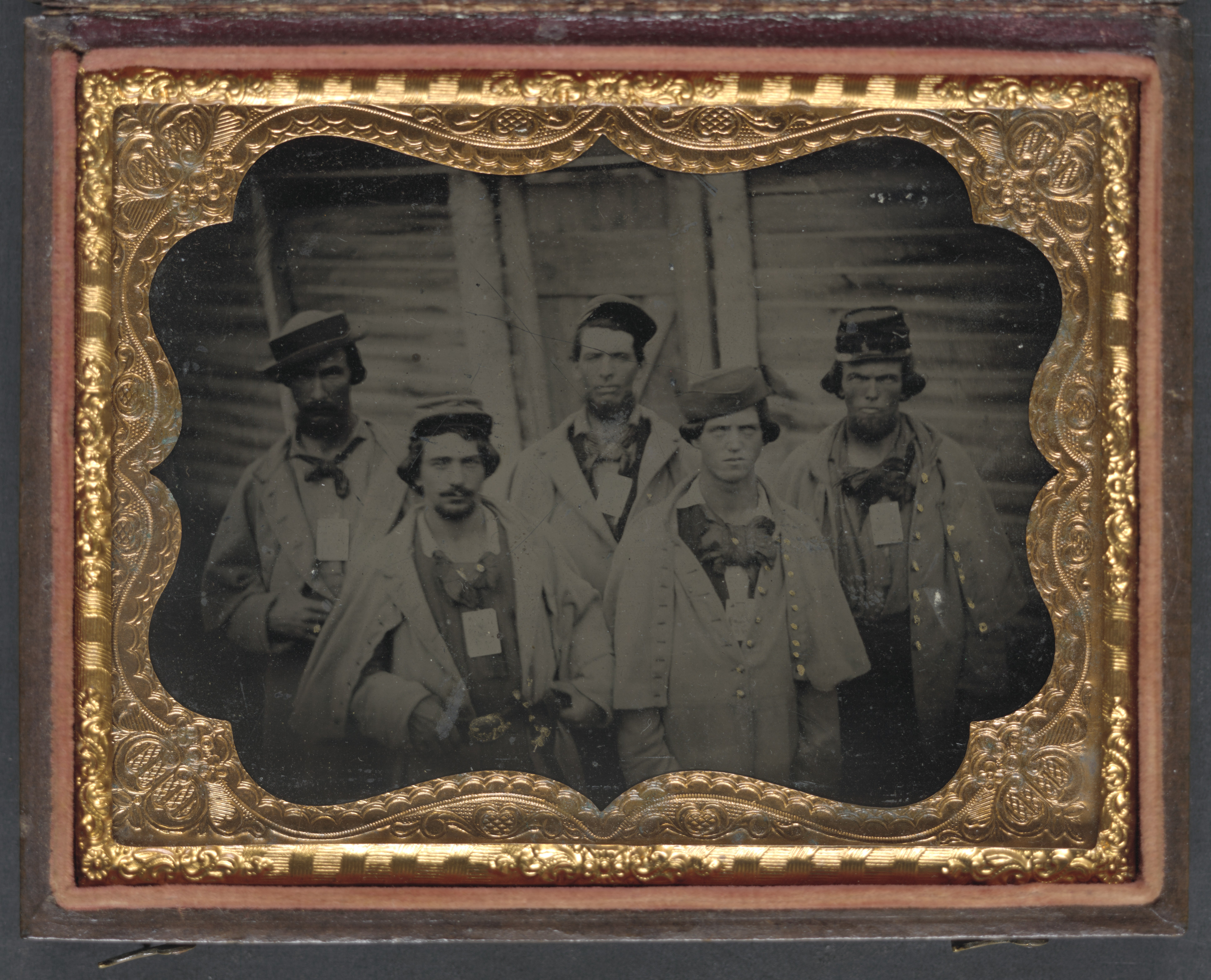
Five unidentified prisoners of war in Confederate uniforms in front of their barracks at Camp Douglas Prison. From the Library of Congress Prints and Photographs Division, Liljenquist Family Collection of Civil War Photographs

=== Late 1864 and 1865 ===
Toward the end of 1864, surgeons refused to send recovering prisoners back to the barracks due to the rampant scurvy, attributable to Hoffman's policy of withholding vegetables from the prisoners. In October 1864, 984 of 7,402 prisoners were reported as sick in the barracks. Meanwhile, in November 1864, as repairs were being carried out, water was cut off to the camp and even to the hospital. Prisoners had to risk being shot in order to gather snow, even beyond the dead line, for coffee and other uses.

On December 5, 1864, prisoners from Confederate General John Bell Hood's army, which had been shattered at the Battle of Franklin and the Battle of Nashville, began to arrive at Camp Douglas. These "weak and destitute" prisoners were made to undress and stand outside for a long period of time in ice and snow while guards robbed them of any valuables. One of these prisoners, John Copley, stated that rations were sufficient to keep the men "tolerably hungry."

By this time, the new 6-inch (150 mm) water pipes kept latrines running smoothly. With bath and laundry facilities now available, prisoners themselves enforced clothes washing and bathing if other prisoners were recalcitrant. Although censored, mail was sent and delivered faithfully, even to and from prisoners in the dungeon. Little, if any, evidence backs up a few later assertions that prisoners "often" froze to death, although some sick prisoners who should have been in the hospital probably did die because of the cold. Near the end of March 1865, a sewer pipe broke and with the incentive of forty-two barrels of whiskey, prisoners were put to work repairing it.

The camp officials contracted with an unscrupulous undertaker, C. H. Jordan, who sold some of the bodies of Confederate prisoners to medical schools and had the rest buried in shallow graves without coffins. Some bodies reportedly were even dumped in Lake Michigan, only to wash up on its shores. Levy states that bodies may have ended up in the lake because they were initially buried in shallow graves along the shore and were exposed due to erosion. Jordan shipped 143 bodies to Kentucky, according to official records, and claimed to have sent 400 bodies to the families of the deceased during the course of the war. Many dead prisoners' bodies initially were buried in unmarked paupers' graves in Chicago's City Cemetery (located on the site of today's Lincoln Park). In 1867 their bodies were reinterred at what is now known as Confederate Mound in Oak Woods Cemetery (5 miles (8.0 km) south of the former Camp Douglas).

=== End of the war ===
With the surrender of Robert E. Lee's army on April 9, 1865, enough former Confederate prisoners volunteered to enlist in the U.S. Army to "join in the frontier Indian warfare" to fill ten companies. Despite the imminent end of the war, a few instances of cruelty by guards were reported even after this date. On May 8, 1865, Colonel (and by this time, Brevet Brigadier General) Sweet received the order to release all prisoners except those above the rank of colonel. Those who took the oath of allegiance were provided transportation home but those who did not were on their own. About 1,770 prisoners refused to take the oath. On July 5, 1865, the guards were withdrawn from the camp. Only sixteen prisoners then remained at the camp hospital. Sweet resigned from the army on September 19, 1865, and was briefly replaced as commander of the camp by Captain Edward R. P. Shurley. About October 1, 1865, Captain E. C. Phetteplace was appointed as the last commander of the camp. About 26,060 Confederate soldiers had passed through the Camp Douglas prison camp by the end of the war.

After the war, the camp was decommissioned and the barracks and other buildings were demolished. The structures were taken down by the end of November 1865. The property was sold off or returned to its owners during late 1865 and early 1866.

== Aftermath ==
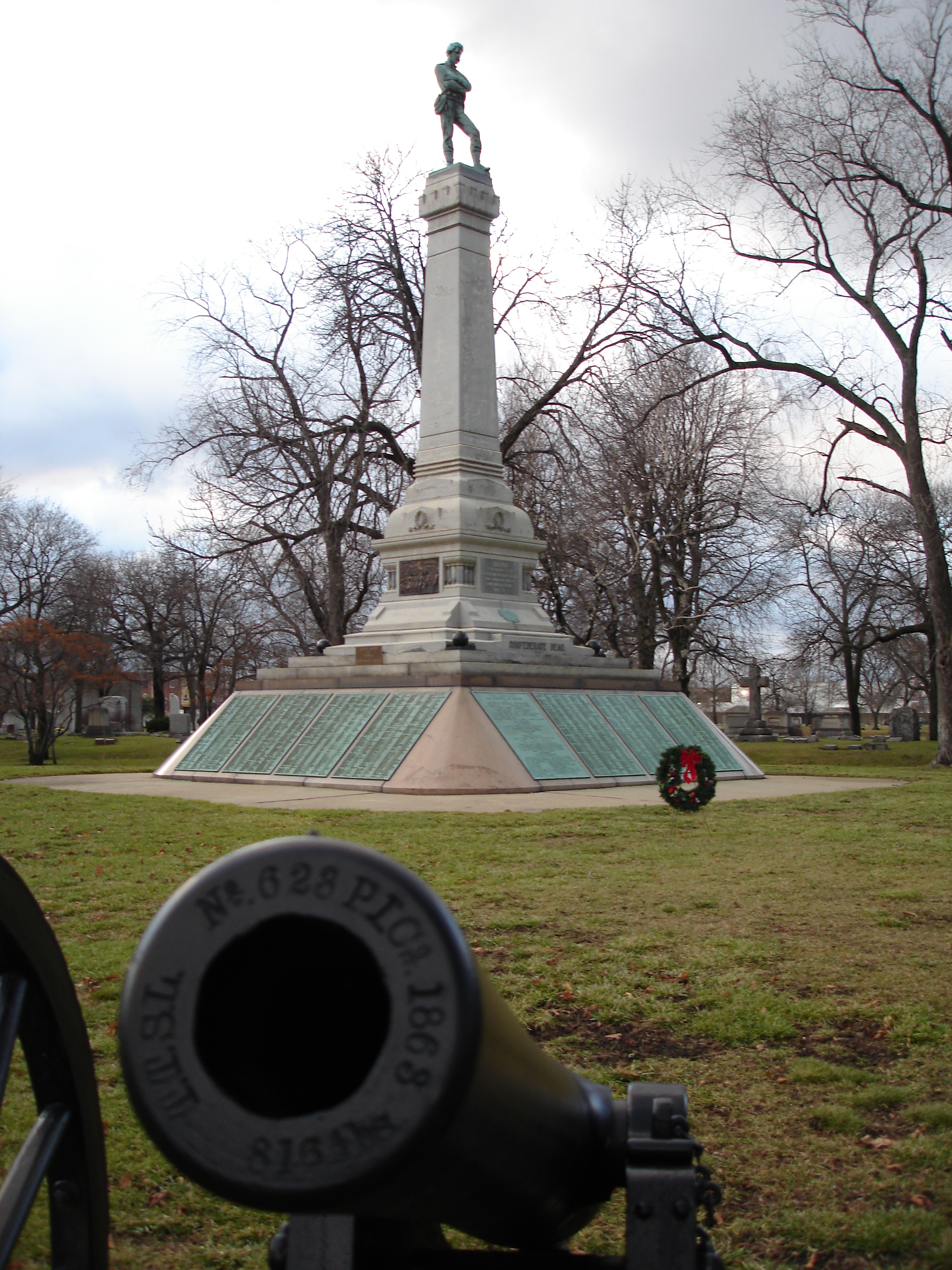
Oak Woods Cemetery, Chicago

=== Deaths ===
The official death toll for Confederate prisoners at Camp Douglas is given by several sources as 4,454. The worst period for mortality at the camp was 1865 when 867 prisoners died before the war ended and the remaining prisoners were released: 2,000 in May and 4,000 in June. Only 16 hospitalized men remained at the camp, according to Levy, or 30 according to Kelly, after July 5, 1865.

In 1892, the United Confederate Veterans of Chicago (UCV) appealed for funds to build a monument in Oak Woods Cemetery where almost all of the Confederate dead were reinterred from City Cemetery and the cemetery for those who died from smallpox near Camp Douglas. In that document, the UCV estimated that about 1,500 more unidentified Confederate dead were buried at Oak Woods. The document states that these bodies "…cannot be traced further, except in numbers, thereby making the probable aggregate as roundly stated above [6,000]." In the book compiling the speeches and material for the dedication of the monument in 1895, John Cox Underwood of the UCV stated that he had identified 4,317 of those buried in "Confederate Mound", the mass grave at Oak Woods Cemetery, that 412 more were identified by the U.S. Government in the roster of those reinterred from the smallpox cemetery and that an estimated 1,500 more were on registers burned in the Great Chicago Fire of 1871, for a total of 6,229. In 1912, Josiah Seymour Currey wrote that "there are 6,129 bodies of Confederate soldiers lying in Oakwoods Cemetery."

More recently, in 2007, Kelly Pucci used the 6,000 figure for Camp Douglas deaths. In 2015, David L. Keller wrote that "the total number of deaths at Camp Douglas is somewhere between the 4,243 names contained on the monument at the Confederate Mound at Oak Woods Cemetery and the 7,000 reported by some historians." He wrote that the best estimates are between 5,000 and 6,000. He cited poor record keeping and the actions of those who handled the bodies for the lack of an exact number. Keller states that up to 50 percent of those who died before April 1863 were not found later. Because City Cemetery was close to Lake Michigan, many bodies were alleged to be swept into the lake.

In the aftermath of the war, Camp Douglas, though not exclusively, sometimes came to be described as the North's "Andersonville" for its poor conditions and large number of deaths. Camp Douglas was one of the longest operating and largest prisons in the North. Although the number of prisoners who died there was more than at other locations, the percentage of prisoners who died at Camp Douglas was similar to most other Union prisoner of war camps. The death rate of prisoners at Camp Douglas was lower than at Andersonville and the conditions at Camp Douglas were better. If any one camp could be called the "Andersonville of the North," it would more likely be Elmira Prison at Elmira, New York where the deaths per thousand prisoners were 241.0 versus 44.1 at Camp Douglas.

=== Modern day ===
Today, condominiums fill most of the site where Camp Douglas stood. For many years, a local funeral home built on the site maintained prisoner records and a Confederate flag at half-staff. The business closed December 31, 2007. In 2012 archaeological work at the site was conducted and since 2013 has continued on a bi-annual basis with help from college students from DePaul University (under the direction of Dr. Michael Gregory) as well as other local volunteers and children from the neighborhood. A group called Camp Douglas Restoration Foundation, formed in 2010, hopes to spur the development of a permanent museum on the site.

== See also ==
- List of Civil War POW prisons and camps
- A. B. Dilworth - negotiated the release of Confederate prisoners from Camp Douglas
