= Alfred Bruce Brackett =

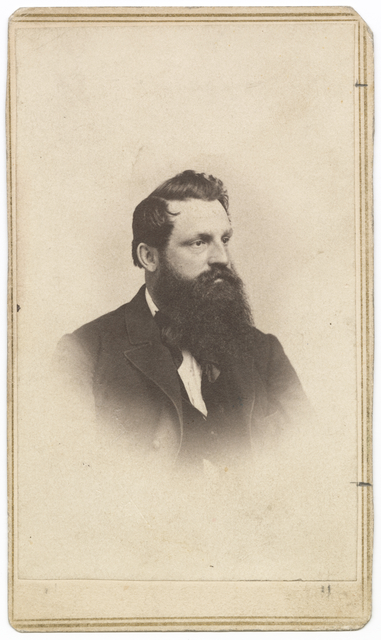
- Brackett c. 1863 by Joel Emmons Whitney

Deputy Sheriff of the Hennepin County Sheriff's Office

Personal details
- Born: May 22, 1826 Newmarket, New Hampshire, U.S.
- Died: September 22, 1892 (aged 66) Roseville, Minnesota, U.S.
- Resting place: Roselawn Cemetery, Roseville, Minnesota

Military service
- Allegiance: United States
- Branch/service: Union Army
- Years of service: 1861–1866
- Rank: Major
- Commands: Brackett's Minnesota Cavalry Battalion
- Battles/wars: American Civil War; Battle of Lockridge Mill; Siege of Corinth; Battle of Riggins Hill; Battle of Stones River; Battle of Dover (1863); Sully's Expedition (1863–1864); Battle of Killdeer Mountain; Battle of the Badlands

Alfred Bruce Brackett (May 22,1826 – September 22, 1892) was a forty-niner gold prospector during the California gold rush, business owner, and military officer. During the American Civil War Brackett commanded Brackett's Minnesota Cavalry Battalion.

== Early life ==
Alfred Bruce Brackett was born on May 2, 1826, in Newmarket, New Hampshire, to Nathaniel Brackett (1779-1857) and Elizabeth Brackett (1781-1856). Not much is known about Brackett's early life other than the fact that he left home in 1841 at the age of 15 to work in Boston as a grocer. In 1848 Brackett traveled to California as part of the California gold rush, returned to Boston in 1852 and traveled to Minnesota. Brackett was a business partner with Chauncey Wright Griggs for several years before serving in the field of law enforcement. During his law enforcement career Brackett was involved in the Wright County War and served as the deputy sheriff of the Hennepin County Sheriff's Office.

== American Civil War ==
=== Curtis Horse and 5th Iowa Cavalry Regiment ===
At the outbreak of the American Civil War Brackett organized a cavalry company of volunteers in the Minneapolis–Saint Paul area on October 28, 1861. Brackett's company of cavalry was integrated into the "Curtis Horse", later named the 5th Iowa Cavalry Regiment under Colonel William Warren Lowe. The Curtis Horse was made up of volunteers from Iowa, Nebraska, Minnesota, and Missouri.

The Curtis Horse was eventually redesignated as the 5th Iowa Cavalry Regiment and fought in several key engagements during the Shiloh Campaign, most notably at the Battle of Fort Donelson and the Siege of Corinth. During the Battle of Lockridge Mill in Weakley County, Tennessee, three companies, E, F, and G of the 5th Iowa, including Brackett himself, were captured. During the skirmish Major Carl Schaeffer Boernstein was mortally wounded, Captain William Alexander Haw of Company F was mortally wounded, and Captain Henning Von Minden of Company G was also wounded. The unit was later deployed with the Army of the Cumberland during the Tullahoma Campaign before it was transferred to Alabama.

=== Brackett's Battalion ===
Companies G, I, and K were eventually detached from the 5th Iowa Cavalry on February 25, 1864, and redesignated as Brackett's Minnesota Cavalry Battalion, with Brackett appointed as the battalion's commander with the rank of Major. Brackett's Battalion would serve in the Department of the Northwest in Alfred Sully's first and second expeditions against the Dakota people from 1864-1866. The battalion fought at the Battle of Killdeer Mountain and the Battle of the Badlands. In May and June 1866 when the men were finally mustered out the soldiers of Brackett's Battalion had served a total of four years and nine months.

== Later life ==
Following his military service Brackett continued to live in Minnesota for the remainder of his life. Letters, reports, orders, and commissions related to Brackett and his military service are held at the Minnesota Historical Society. Brackett had two wives: Mary Elizabeth Ferguson (1839-1871) who he married in 1865, and Mary's sister Martha "Mattie" L. Ferguson (1842-1920) who he married in 1875. Brackett died on September 22, 1892, at the age of 66 from diabetes.
