= Brackett's Minnesota Cavalry Battalion =

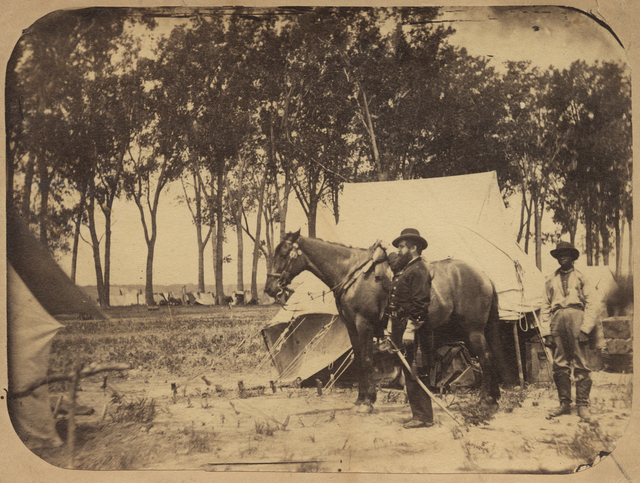
- Major Alfred B. Brackett with his horse and aide Van Garren in 1864
- Active: September 1861 to June 1, 1866
- Country: United States
- Allegiance: Union
- Branch: Cavalry
- Engagements: American Civil War: Shiloh Campaign; Battle of Fort Donelson; Battle of Lockridge Mill; Battle of Paris; Sully's Expedition Against the Sioux; Battle of Killdeer Mountain; Battle of the Badlands

Commanders
- Major: Alfred Bruce Brackett

Brackett's Minnesota Cavalry Battalion or Brackett's Battalion was a Minnesota USV cavalry battalion that served in the Union Army during the American Civil War and in the direct aftermath of the Dakota War of 1862.

== Origins ==
The companies which would eventually form the ranks of Brackett's Battalion of Independent Minnesota Volunteer Cavalry were drawn from companies G, I, and K of the Minnesota Light Cavalry. These companies had their origins as the "Curtis Light Horse" in 1861, named for General Samuel Ryan Curtis and was commanded by Colonel William Warren Lowe. The Curtis Horse was made up of volunteers from Iowa, Nebraska, Minnesota, and Missouri. The unit was eventually redesignated as the 5th Iowa Cavalry Regiment and fought in several key engagements during the Shiloh Campaign, most notably at the Battle of Fort Donelson and the Siege of Corinth. During a skirmish at Lockridge Mill in Weakley County, Tennessee three companies, E, F, and G of the 5th Iowa were captured. During the skirmish Major Carl Schaeffer Boernstein was mortally wounded and later died, Captain William Alexander Haw of Company F was mortally wounded, and Captain Henning von Minden of Company G was also wounded. The unit was later deployed with the Army of the Cumberland during the Tullahoma Campaign before it was transferred to Alabama.

Companies G, I, and K were eventually detached from the 5th Iowa Cavalry on February 25, 1864 and redesignated as Brackett's Minnesota Cavalry Battalion, named after the 5th Iowa's Major Alfred Bruce Brackett. Brackett had previously been the Captain of Company K when it was first mustered in St. Paul at Fort Snelling on October 28, 1861, he was eventually promoted to Major of the 5th Iowa in 1862.

Brackett's Battalion would serve in the Department of the Northwest in Alfred Sully's first and second expeditions against the Dakota from 1864-1866. The battalion fought at the Battle of Killdeer Mountain and the Battle of the Badlands. In May and June 1866 when the men were finally mustered out the soldiers of Brackett's Battalion had served a total of four years and nine months.

== Service ==
Companies A, B, and C organized at Fort Snelling, Minnesota, as 1st, 2nd and 3rd Companies, Minnesota Light Cavalry, September to November, 1861. Ordered to Benton Barracks, Missouri, November, 1861, and attached to Curtis Horse, an Independent Regiment of Cavalry, which was later designated 5th Iowa Cavalry. Assigned as Companies G, I, and K. Duty at Benton Barracks, Missouri, until February, 1862. Moved to Fort Henry, Tennessee, February 8–11. Served unassigned, Department of the Tennessee, to November, 1862. District of Columbus, Kentucky, 13th Army Corps, Department of the Tennessee, to December, 1862. District of Columbus, Kentucky, 16th Army Corps, Department of the Tennessee, to June, 1863. 1st Brigade, Turchin's 2nd Cavalry Division, Army of the Cumberland, to October, 1863. 3rd Brigade, 2nd Division, Cavalry Corps, Army of the Cumberland, to December, 1863. 1st Brigade, 2nd Division, Cavalry Corps, Army of the Cumberland, to January 7, 1864. Detached from 5th Iowa Cavalry February 25, 1864, Designated Brackett's Battalion, Minnesota Cavalry. Duty at Fort Snelling, Minnesota, to May 2, 1864. Attached to Pollock's 1st Brigade, District of Iowa, Department of the Northwest. Sully's Northwestern Indian Expedition June 4 to November 10, 1864. Battle of Killdeer Mountain July 28. Action in Battle of the Badlands, August 8–9. Fort Ridgley, Minnesota, until Spring, 1865. Sully's operations against Indians May to October, 1865. Patrol duty from Sioux City to Fort Randall, October, 1865, to May, 1866. Mustered out June 1, 1866.

== Detailed service ==
Companies A, B, and C were organized at Fort Snelling, Minnesota, as the 1st, 2nd and 3rd Companies, Minnesota Light Cavalry from September to November, 1861. They were ordered to Benton Barracks, Missouri, in November, 1861, and attached to Curtis Horse, an Independent Regiment of Cavalry, which was later designated 5th Iowa Volunteer Cavalry Regiment. The Minnesota Battalion was assigned as Companies G, I, and K. After duty at Benton Barracks, Missouri, until February, 1862., the battalion moved to Fort Henry, Tennessee, from February 8–11, 1862. Engaged in patrol duty during battle of Fort Donelson, Tennessee. Expedition to destroy railroad bridge over Tennessee River February 14–16. 1862. Duty at Fort Henry and Fort Heiman, Tennessee, until February 5, 1863, and at Fort Donelson, Tennessee, until June 5, 1863. Moved from Fort Henry to Savannah, Tennessee, March 25-April 1, 1862. Moved toward Nashville, Tennessee, repairing roads and erecting telegraph lines April 3–6. Advance on and siege of Corinth, Mississippi, April 29-May 30. Acting as escorts to Telegraph Corps, Lockridge Mills, May 5. Occupation of Corinth May 30, and pursuit to Booneville May 31-June 12. Duty at Humboldt until August, 1862. Scouting and protecting railroad. Action at Fort Donelson, Tennessee, August 25. Cumberland Iron Works August 26. Expedition to Clarksville September 5–9. New Providence September 6. Clarksville September 7. Scout toward Eddyville October 29-November 10. Expedition from Fort Heiman December 18–28. Fort Donelson February 3, 1863, Duty at Fort Donelson until June. Moved to Murfreesboro and Nashville, Tennessee, June 5–11. Scout on Middleton and Eagleville Pike June 10. Expedition to Lebanon June 15–17. Lebanon June 16. Middle Tennessee or Tullahoma Campaign June 23-July 7. Guy's Gap, Fosterville, June 25. Guy's Gap. Fosterville and Shelbyville, June 27. Occupation of Middle Tennessee until September. Moved to McMinnville September 6–8, and operating against guerrillas until October. Operations against Wheeler and Roddy September 30-October 17. Garrison Creek near Fosterville and Wartrace October 6. Sugar Creek October 9. Tennessee River October 10. At Maysville until January, 1864. Expedition from Maysville to Whitesburg and Decatur November 14–17, 1863, to destroy boats on the Tennessee River. Outpost duty on line of Tennessee River from south of Huntsville to Bellefonte, Alabama, November and December, 1863. The Minnesota volunteers reenlisted and achieved veteran status on January 1, 1864. Battalion returned to Minnesota on January 7, and was officially detached from 5th Iowa Cavalry Regiment on February 25, 1864, being designated Brackett's Battalion, Minnesota Cavalry at that time. The battalion remained in garrison at Fort Snelling until May 1864 when it was transferred to Sioux City, Iowa, moving there from May 2–25, 1864. It participated in Brigadier General Alfred Sully's Northwestern Indian Expedition against "hostile" Sioux west of the Missouri River from June 4, 1864 to November 10, 1864. The battalion marched to Fort Sully from June 4–15, 1864, and pursued Indians to the Badlands from July 19–28. Then it participated in the Battle of Tah Kah A Kuty or Killdeer Mountain, Dakota Territory on July 28, 1864. After that action it marched to Fort Rice from June 28 to July 7, 1864, then made the passage of the Badlands of Dakota Territory from August 3–18. During this time, the battalion fought in the engagement near the Little Missouri River at Two Hills, the Battle of the Badlands, Dakota Territory, from August 8–9, 1864. The Minnesota companies also helped in the rescue of Fisk's Emigrant train, from September 10–30, 1864. March on Yellowstone River in Montana Territory to Fort Union, Dakota Territory. The battalion spent the winter of 1864-1865 and the spring at Fort Ridgely, Minnesota and then served in Brigadier General Alfred Sully's operations against the Sioux from May to October, 1865. The Minnesotans spent October, 1865 until May, 1866 on patrol duty from Sioux City, Iowa to Fort Randall, Dakota Territory, with headquarters at Sioux City, Iowa before being mustered out on June 1, 1866.

== Commander ==
- Major Alfred Bruce Brackett.

== Casualties and total strength ==
During its service, Brackett's Cavalry Battalion lost 1 officer and 4 enlisted men killed in action or died of wounds received in battle, 6 enlisted men by disease, for a total of 11 fatalities.

== Equipment ==
The battalion had a variety of weapons and firearms throughout its service in the 5th Iowa Cavalry and later as Brackett's Battalion, the following list is just some of the weapons utilized by the unit during its service from 1861-1866:

- M1836 Hall Carbine
- Remington Model 1858
- Colt Army Model 1860
- Sharps Carbine
- Model 1840 Cavalry Saber

== See also ==
- List of Minnesota Civil War Units
- 5th Iowa Volunteer Cavalry Regiment
