= Henning Von Minden =

Civil War-era Union Army officer

Major Henning Von Minden
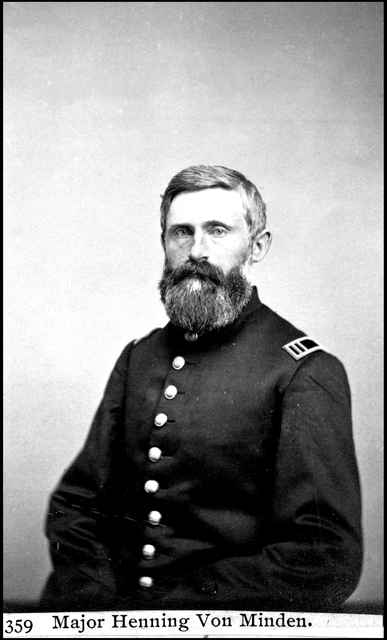
- Captain Von Minden c.1864 by Joel Emmons Whitney
- Born: December 30, 1826; Schleswig–Holstein
- Died: December 25, 1871 (aged 44); Saint Paul, Minnesota
- Burial place: Oakland Cemetery, Saint Paul, Minnesota
- Education: Leibniz University Hannover (Polytechnische Schule)
- Children: 3
- Military career
- Allegiance: German Confederation; United States of America
- Branch: Prussian Army; Union Army
- Service years: 1848-1851; 1861-1866
- Rank: Major
- Units: Company G, 5th Iowa Cavalry Regiment; Brackett's Minnesota Cavalry Battalion; Hatch's Minnesota Cavalry Battalion
- Commands: Company G, 5th Iowa Cavalry Regiment; Company A, Brackett's Minnesota Cavalry Battalion; Hatch's Minnesota Cavalry Battalion
- Conflicts: American Civil War: Battle of Fort Donelson; Battle of Lockridge Mill; Siege of Corinth; Battle of Riggins Hill; Battle of Stones River; Battle of Dover (1863); Wheeler's October 1863 Raid; Chattanooga campaign; Sully's Expedition Against the Sioux: Battle of Killdeer Mountain; Battle of the Badlands

Henning Von Minden (December 30, 1826 - December 25, 1871) was a German American civil engineer, surveyor, and military officer from Schleswig-Holstein and a prominent citizen of Saint Paul, Minnesota. Von Minden was responsible for the platting of Chisago City, Minnesota and was an associate of Ignatius L. Donnelly.

== Early life ==
Henning Von Minden was born on December 30, 1826, in Schleswig-Holstein; little else is known about his upbringing. At the time, the Duchy of Schleswig was highly contested between the German Confederation and Denmark. Von Minden was educated as a civil engineer at the Leibniz University Hannover (at the time the Polytechnische Schule) and later was a volunteer in the First Schleswig War as a cavalryman. In autumn 1855 Von Minden emigrated to the United States, electing to settle in St. Paul in what was then the Minnesota Territory.

== Civil engineering career ==
As a civil engineer, drafter, and cartographer Von Minden worked as a surveyor, architect, and consultant in St. Paul alongside Fredric Wippermann; this partnership lasted from 1857 until September 13, 1860. Von Minden later partnered with C. Meyer to draft an 1856 map of Minnesota and St. Paul which is still held by the Minnesota Historical Society. In June 1857 Von Minden assisted Ignatius L. Donnelly in the platting of Chisago City, Minnesota alongside Isaac Bernheimer and Samuel W. Arnold of Philadelphia. In 1858 Von Minden was elected as the surveyor of St. Paul, the very same year Minnesota was admitted to the Union as the 32nd State.

== American Civil War ==
=== The Curtis Horse and the 5th Iowa Cavalry Regiment ===
When the American Civil War began Von Minden organized a unit of United States Volunteer cavalry on October 9, 1861, which was named the 1st Company of Minnesota Light Cavalry or "Von Minden's Company". This unit was raised at Fort Snelling alongside the 2nd and 3rd Companies of Minnesota Light Cavalry under D. Mortimer West and Alfred Bruce Brackett. The Minnesota Light Cavalry companies were eventually merged with other cavalry units being organized in Nebraska Territory and Iowa, the combined unit named the "Curtis Horse" after Samuel Ryan Curtis; the name was later changed to the 5th Iowa Cavalry Regiment. Von Minden would serve with the 5th Iowa Cavalry from 1861 to 1864. During his time as the Captain of Company G he was captured twice; once during the Battle of Lockridge Mill and again during the Battle of Dover near Fort Donelson. Von Minden was eventually paroled along with his men and was transferred along with the rest of the Minnesota companies G, I, and K back to Minnesota where they were reformed as Brackett's Minnesota Cavalry Battalion.

=== Brackett's Battalion ===
When companies G, I, and K of the 5th Iowa Cavalry Regiment were detached and sent back to Minnesota on February 25, 1864, they were reorganized as Brackett's Minnesota Cavalry Battalion in order to serve in the Sioux Wars under the command of Alfred Sully under the military district of Iowa. Von Minden was elected as the Captain of Company A in Brackett's Battalion while it was deployed to the Dakota Territory. During the ensuing campaigns against the Dakota people the unit would ultimately take part in the Battle of Killdeer Mountain and the Battle of the Badlands. Minden was later assigned to Major general John Pope's staff as a topographical engineer.

=== Hatch's Battalion ===
In September 1864 Von Minden was promoted to the rank of Major and reassigned to Hatch's Minnesota Cavalry Battalion under the command of Colonel Charles Powell Adams. While assigned to Hatch's Battalion he was headquartered at Sauk Centre, Minnesota. Von Minden was discharged with the rest of the battalion in the summer of 1866.

== Later life ==
After the war Von Minden worked as a clerk and bookkeeper for William Dawson and the Dawson & Company Bank in St. Paul. Dawson later became the president of the Bank of Minnesota, as well as the 20th mayor of St. Paul. Von Minden was later appointed as the Chief Draftsman for the Surveyor General's Office of Minnesota.

== Legacy ==
Von Minden's home survives as the Barnum-Von Minden House located at 262 Banfil Street in Saint Paul, Minnesota. Von Minden Street in West Seventh, Saint Paul was named in honor of Von Minden, but was later renamed to West Michigan Street. "Von Minden" Post 105 of the Grand Army of the Republic was named in honor of Henning Von Minden; it was located in Jordan, Minnesota and existed from 1884 to 1918.
