= James Henry Coates =

- Born: November 27, 1829; Norristown, Pennsylvania
- Died: May 17, 1902 (aged 72); St Louis, Missouri
- Burial place: Jefferson Barracks National Cemetery
- Military career
- Allegiance: (United States) Union; Illinois
- Branch: Union Army
- Service years: 1861–1865
- Rank: Colonel; Brevet Brigadier General
- Commands: 11th Illinois Infantry Regiment; 2nd Bde, 1st Div, XVII Corps.
- Conflicts: American Civil War; Battle of Fort Donelson; Battle of Shiloh; Battle of Riggins Hill; Vicksburg campaign; Battle of Yazoo City; Yazoo City expedition; Battle of Spanish Fort; Battle of Fort Blakeley

James Henry Coates (November 27, 1829 – May 17, 1902) became the commanding officer of the 11th Illinois Infantry Regiment during the American Civil War. Born in Pennsylvania, he became a captain in the 11th Illinois in 1861. He fought at Fort Donelson, Shiloh, Riggins Hill, and in the Vicksburg campaign. He rose in rank to major and lieutenant colonel before being promoted colonel after the regiment's commander was killed at the Siege of Vicksburg in 1863. He led an expedition up the Yazoo River which resulted in the Battle of Yazoo City in March 1864. He led a brigade in XVII Corps in the Yazoo City expedition and his regiment in the Mobile campaign. He received the brevet rank of brigadier general for war service on March 13, 1865.

== See also ==
- List of American Civil War brevet generals (Union)
