= Battery C, 2nd Illinois Light Artillery Regiment =

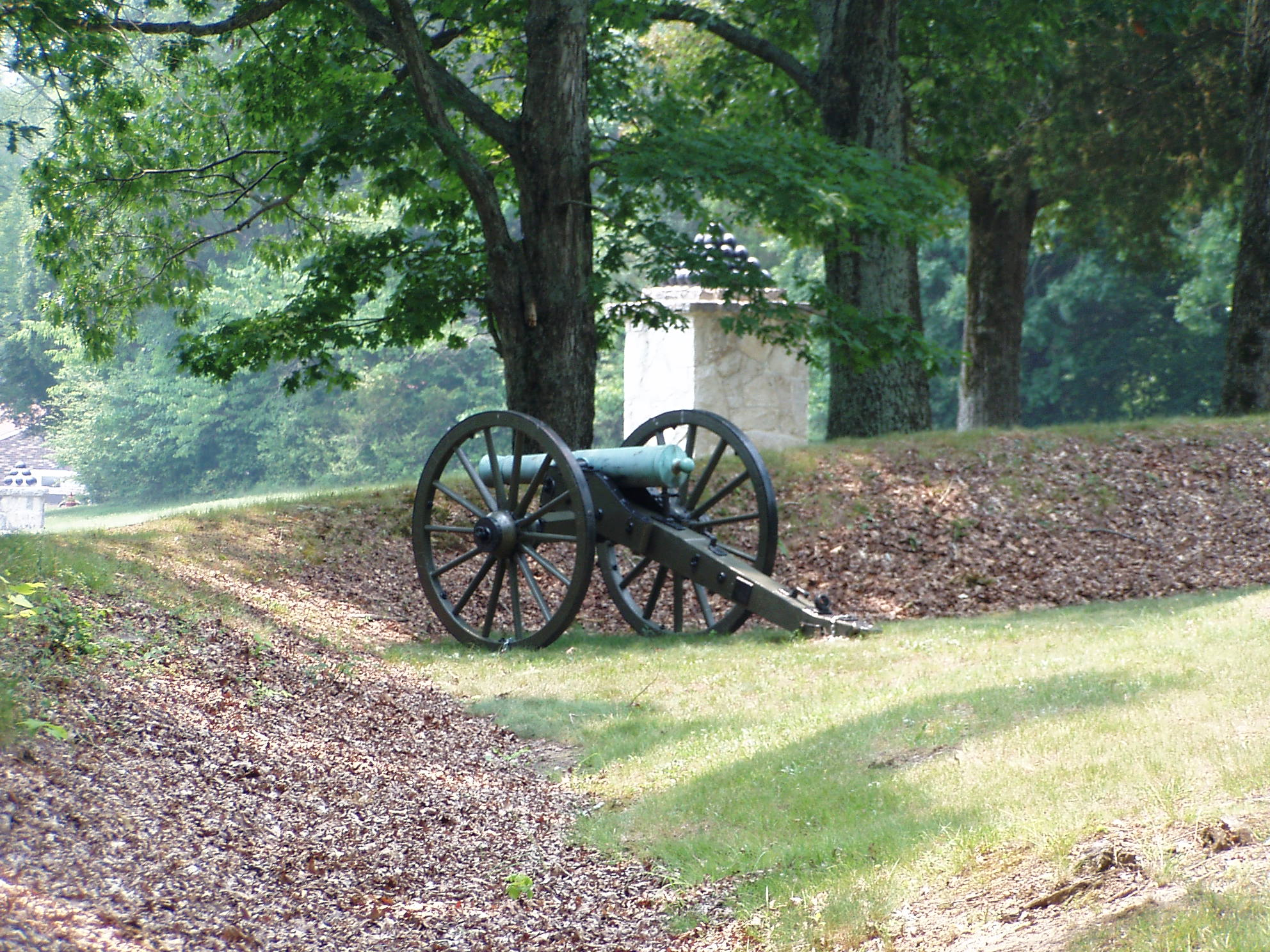
- M1841 6-pounder field gun is located at Fort Donelson National Battlefield. Battery C spent most of the war in garrison at or near Fort Donelson.
- Active: 5 Aug. 1861 – 3 Aug. 1865
- Country: United States
- Allegiance: (United States) Union; Illinois
- Branch: Union Army
- Type: Field Artillery
- Size: Artillery Battery
- Engagements: American Civil War; Battle of Riggins Hill (1862)

Commanders
- Notable commanders: Caleb Hopkins; James P. Flood

Battery C, 2nd Illinois Light Artillery Regiment was an artillery battery from Illinois that served in the Union Army during the American Civil War. The battery was organized in August 1861 at Cairo, Illinois and remained there until March 1862. The battery spent the rest of the war on guard duty at Fort Donelson and Clarksville, Tennessee and engaged in some skirmishes. The soldiers were mustered out in August 1865.

== History ==
=== Organization ===
Organized at Cairo, Ill., August 5, 1861. Attached to District of Cairo, Ill., to March, 1862. District of Columbus, Ky., to November, 1862. District of Columbus, Ky., 13th Army Corps (Old), Dept. of the Tennessee, to December, 1862. District of Columbus, Ky., 6th Division, 16th Army Corps, to June, 1863. 3rd Division, Reserve Corps, Dept. of the Cumberland, to October, 1863. District of Clarksville and Fort Donelson, Tenn., Dept. of the Cumberland, to March, 1865. 5th Sub-District, District of Middle Tennessee, Dept. of the Cumberland, to August, 1865.

=== Service ===
Duty in District of Cairo until March, 1862. Ordered to Fort Donelson, Tenn., and garrison duty there and at Clarksville, Tenn., until August, 1865. Also engaged in mounted scout duty between the Cumberland and Tennessee Rivers. Expedition from Fort Donelson to Clarksville September 5–10, 1862. Action at New Providence September 6. Rickett's Hill, Clarksville, September 7. Near Waverly and Richland Creek October 23. Cumberland Iron Works, Fort Donelson, February 3, 1863. Mustered out August 3, 1865.

Battery C lost during service 1 Officer and 3 Enlisted men killed and mortally wounded and 18 Enlisted men by disease. Total 22.

== See also ==
- List of Illinois Civil War units
