= 83rd Illinois Infantry Regiment =

83rd Regiment Illinois Volunteer Infantry
- Illinois flag
- Active: August 21, 1862, to July 5, 1865
- Country: United States
- Allegiance: Union
- Branch: Infantry
- Engagements: American Civil War: Battle of Dover (1863)

The 83rd Regiment Illinois Volunteer Infantry was an infantry regiment that served in the Union Army during the American Civil War.

== Service ==
The 83rd Illinois Infantry was organized at Monmouth, Illinois and mustered into Federal service on August 21, 1862. Commanding the regiment was Colonel Abner C. Harding.

The regiment was heavily engaged on February 3, 1863, at Fort Donelson when it repulsed an attack by 2,500 Confederate troops under Joseph Wheeler and Nathan Bedford Forrest. The loss to the regiment was 13 killed and 51 wounded. This engagement is known as the Battle of Dover (1863).

The regiment was mustered out on June 26, 1865, in Nashville, Tennessee and discharged in Chicago, Illinois, on July 5, 1865. Future lawman Virgil Earp served as a private in the regiment.

== Detailed Service ==
This regiment was organized at Monmouth and was mustered into the U. S. service Aug. 21, 1862. Cos. A, B, C, F and H were recruited in Warren County, D in Mercer, E, G, I and K, in Knox. The regiment moved from camp Aug. 25, via Burlington and St. Louis to Cairo arriving there the 29th and reporting to Brig.-Gen. Tuttle commanding the post. On Sept. 3 it moved to Fort Henry and thence to Fort Donelson, where it remained until Sept., 1863. It had heavy guard duty to perform, and as the whole country, especially along the Tennessee and Cumberland Rivers was infested with guerrillas, it had daily skirmishes with the enemy, some of them being quite severe, as at Waverly, Tenn., and Garrettsburg, Ky. On Feb. 3, nine companies of the 83rd with Co. C, 2nd Ill. Light Artillery, successfully resisted the attack of Forrest and Wheeler with 2,500 men on Fort Donelson, the loss of the regiment being 13 killed and 51 wounded. On the morning of Aug. 20, Capt. William M. Turnbull of Co. B, with 11 of his company, left Fort Donelson in pursuit of 5 guerrillas who were making their way to the Tennessee River with a number of horses, but failing to overtake them he was overpowered by a party of guerrillas secreted in the timber, while returning to the fort. Turnbull and 8 of his men were killed and but 3 of the party escaped to tell the sad fate of their companions. During the year 1864 the regiment had some 200 miles of communications to guard, as well as much heavy patrol duty, and during the winter of 1864-65 it was on provost duty at Nashville, Tenn. On June 26, 1865, the regiment was mustered out at Nashville and sent to Chicago, where it received final pay and discharge on July 4.

== Total strength and casualties ==
The regiment suffered 4 officers and 34 enlisted men who were killed in action or who died of their wounds and 1 officers and 82 enlisted men who died of disease, for a total of 121 fatalities.

== Commanders ==
- Colonel Abner C. Harding - Promoted to brigadier general February 1863.
- Colonel Arthur Arnold Smith

== Notable Members ==
- Virgil Earp

== See also ==
- List of Illinois Civil War Units
- Illinois in the American Civil War
- Regimental Flag of the 83rd Illinois Infantry
