= 7th Tennessee Cavalry Regiment (Confederate) =

- Active: 1862–1865
- Country: Confederate States
- Allegiance: Tennessee
- Branch: Army
- Type: Cavalry
- Size: Regiment
- Nicknames: Logwood's Cavalry Battalion (6th Battalion); Jackson's 1st Tennessee Cavalry (1st Tennessee Cavalry); Duckworth's 7th Tennessee Cavalry Regiment
- Engagements: American Civil War: Battle of Belmont (6th Battalion); Battle of Island Number Ten; Battle of Lockridge Mill; Siege of Corinth; Holly Springs Raid; West Tennessee Raids; First Battle of Collierville; Battle of Athens (1864); Fort Pillow Massacre; Battle of Tishomingo Creek; Battle of Tupelo; Battle of Johnsonville; Battle of Spring Hill; Battle of Franklin; Battle of Nashville; Battle of Anthony's Hill; Wilson's Raid

Commanders
- Colonel: William Lafayette Duckworth
- Colonel: William Hicks Jackson
- Colonel: John G. Stocks
- Lieutenant Colonel: William Fletcher Taylor
- Major: Clement Claiborne Clay

The 7th Tennessee Cavalry Regiment was a cavalry regiment recruited from the state of Tennessee and served in the Confederate States Army during the American Civil War. The regiment fought in both the Western theater of the American Civil War and the Trans-Mississippi theater of the American Civil War. While the majority of the regiment came from Tennessee a minority came from Alabama, Kentucky, Missouri, and Mississippi. Although a regiment, the unit frequently served as a detachment in various armies including the Army of Tennessee, the Army of the West, and the Army of the Trans-Mississippi among others.

== History ==
The 7th Tennessee Cavalry Regiment has its origins as the 6th Tennessee Cavalry Battalion, or Logwood's Cavalry Battalion and William Hicks "Red" Jackson's 1st Tennessee Cavalry Regiment. The 6th Tennessee Cavalry Battalion was organized in July, 1861 with six total companies. Many of the men were from Haywood, Fayette, Tipton, and Shelby counties. The 6th Tennessee Cavalry Battalion was organized as follows:

Organization of the 6th Tennessee Cavalry Battalion
Company	Earliest Moniker	Primary Place of Recruitment	Earliest Captain
A	Memphis Light Dragoons	Memphis and Shelby County	Thomas H. Logwood
B	The Hardeman Avengers	Boliva and Hardeman County	James Jackson Neely
C	Hill's Cavalry	Haywood, Fayette, and Tipton County	Charles H. Hill
D	The Haywood Rangers	Haywood County, Tennessee	John G. Haywood
E	The Tennessee Mounted Rifles	Shelby County	Josiah "Joe" S. White
F	The Shelby Light Dragoons	Shelby County	John Goff Ballentine

The 6th Tennessee Cavalry Battalion served in the Western Department of the Confederate States Army, a detachment of the 6th Battalion fought at the Battle of Belmont and later the unit saw action in various battles in both Tennessee and Kentucky. In April, 1862 the 6th Tennessee Cavalry Battalion merged with William Hicks Jackson's 1st Tennessee Cavalry Regiment and was redesignated as the 7th Tennessee Cavalry Regiment.

== Organization ==
The 7th Tennessee Cavalry Regiment was assembled in April, 1862. Its companies were from the counties of Shelby, Henry, Haywood, Fayette,Tipton, Hardeman, and Weakley County, Tennessee. Many of the previous companies from the 6th Tennessee Cavalry Battalion kept their original monikers given to them in 1861. The companies were organized as follows:

Organization of the 7th Tennessee Cavalry Regiment
Company	Earliest Moniker	Primary Place of Recruitment	Earliest Captain
A	Memphis Light Dragoons	Memphis and Shelby County	William F. Taylor
B	Hill's Cavalry	Haywood, Fayette, and Tipton County	James P. Russell
C	Marion Foxes or Shelby Light Dragoons	Memphis, Marion, and Shelby County	S. P. Bassett
D	The Haywood Rangers	Haywood, Fayette, and Tipton County	L. W. Taliaferro
E	Hardeman Avengers	Boliva and Hardeman County	W. J. Tate
F	Forked Deer Rangers	Crockett County, Tennessee	Clement Claiborne Clay
G	The Independent Rebel Rangers	Henry County, Tennessee	John G. Stocks
H		Weakley County, Tennessee	H. C. McCuthcen
I		Tipton County, Tennessee	James R. Alexander
K		Shelby, Fayette, and Tipton County	Samuel T. Taylor
L	The Western Rangers	Haywood County, Tennessee	Alexander Duckworth
M		Haywood and Lauderdale County	B. T. Davis

== Service ==
For much of the regiments early history it served under Major General Earl Van Dorn and Van Dorn's Army of the West. After 1862 the 7th Tennessee Cavalry served under Forrest's Cavalry Corps and other various brigades as a detachment including; Frank Crawford Armstrong, Robert A “Black Bob” McCulloch, James Ronald Chalmers, William F. Slemons, James Jackson Neely, and Edmund Rucker. The regiment confronted the Union Army in Mississippi, moved with Nathan Bedford Forrest to West Tennessee and Kentucky, then saw action in East Tennessee. Later the regiment participated in the Battle of Franklin and Battle of Nashville, and in 1865 skirmished in Alabama. Following Wilson's Raid the regiment surrendered in Gainesville, Alabama, in May, 1865. William Hicks Jackson was appointed as the Confederate commissioner to complete the paroling of General Forrest's command in Columbus, Mississippi.

== Commanders ==
- Colonels: William Lafayette Duckworth, William Hicks Jackson, and John G. Stocks
- Lieutenant Colonel: William Fletcher Taylor
- Major: Clement Claiborne Clay.

== Strength ==
The regiment contained 696 effective men in July, 1862, the regiment later had only 210 present for duty in October, 1863.

== Notable people ==
- Nathan Bedford Forrest – Originally served as a private in Josiah White's Company E "Tennessee Mounted Rifles" along with his brother Jesse A. Forrest and 15-year-old son.
- Jesse Anderson Forrest – The younger brother of Nathan Bedford Forrest served in Captain Whites Company E. Forrest later rose to the rank of Lieutenant colonel in the 21st Tennessee Cavalry Regiment.
- William "Bill" Montgomery Forrest – the son of Nathan Bedford Forrest joined at the age of 15 as a Private and later was promoted to the rank of Captain.
- William Hicks Jackson – Served as the second Colonel of the regiment. Jackson was originally the commander of the 1st Tennessee Cavalry Regiment or "Jackson's Regiment".
- Clement Claiborne Clay – The son of Clement Comer Clay. Clay served as the Major of the regiment, he was also elected as a Senator from Alabama to the Confederate States Congress.
- John Goff Ballentine – Served as the Captain of Company F. Ballentine was wounded at the Battle of Lockridge Mill in a duel with 5th Iowa Cavalry Regiment Major Carl Schaeffer Boernstein. Ballentine would later serve as colonel of the 2nd Mississippi Partisan Rangers and was elected as a member of the U.S. House of Representatives from Tennessee's 7th district.

== See also ==
- Nathan Bedford Forrest
- Forrest's Cavalry Corps
- Western theater of the American Civil War
- Tennessee Civil War Confederate Units
- Cavalry in the American Civil War
- Army of the West (1862)
- Army of the Trans-Mississippi
