= 7th Tennessee Cavalry Regiment =

7th Tennessee Cavalry Regiment may refer to two American Civil War units:

- 7th Tennessee Cavalry Regiment (Confederate), also known as Logwood's, Jackson's or Duckworth's
- 7th Tennessee Cavalry Regiment (Union), also known as the 2nd West Tennessee Cavalry
