= John Goff Ballentine =

American politician (1825–1915)

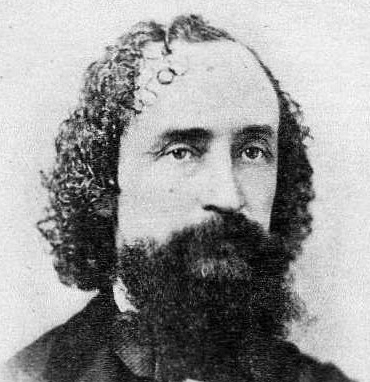

Member of the U.S. House of Representatives from Tennessee's 7th district
- In office March 4, 1883 – March 3, 1887
- Preceded by: Washington C. Whitthorne
- Succeeded by: Washington C. Whitthorne

Personal details
- Born: May 20, 1825 Pulaski, Tennessee, U.S.
- Died: November 23, 1915 (aged 90) Pulaski, Tennessee, U.S.
- Resting place: Maplewood Cemetery
- Party: Democratic
- Spouse: Mary Elizabeth Laird Ballentine
- Children: 4
- Education: University of Nashville; Harvard University
- Profession: Attorney; planter

Military service
- Allegiance: Confederate States of America
- Branch/service: Confederate States Army
- Years of service: 1861–1865
- Rank: Colonel
- Unit: 7th Tennessee Cavalry
- Commands: 2nd Mississippi Partisan Rangers
- Battles/wars: American Civil War

John Goff Ballentine (May 20, 1825 – November 23, 1915) was an American politician who served as a member of the United States House of Representatives for Tennessee's 7th congressional district and a colonel in the Confederate army. A supporter of the Confederacy during the American Civil War, Ballentine was a slave owner.

== Biography ==
Ballentine was born on May 20, 1825, in Pulaski, Tennessee in Giles County, the son of Andrew Mitchell Ballentine and Mary Tuttle Goff. His father was a native of Ireland and a veteran of Napoleon Bonaparte's army. John Goff Ballentine graduated from Wurtemberg Academy in 1841, from the University of Nashville in 1845, and from the law department of Harvard University in 1848. He was a member of the faculty of Livingston Law School in New York. He commenced the practice of law in Pulaski.

== Career ==
Ballentine moved to Panola County, Mississippi about 1854, continued the practice of law, and engaged in the extensive family agricultural pursuits. There he met and married Miss Mary E. Laird, daughter of Dr. Henry Laird of Belmont. The couple had four children. He settled in Memphis, Tennessee in 1860. During the Civil War, he served first as a Captain in the 7th Tennessee Cavalry, then as Colonel of his own regiment, the 2nd Mississippi Partisan Rangers. Ballentine was wounded at the 1862 Battle of Lockridge Mill in a sabre duel with 5th Iowa Cavalry Major Carl Schaeffer Boernstein, and was later also wounded in the Atlanta Campaign. After the war, he returned to Pulaski, Tennessee.

Elected as a Democrat to the Forty-eighth and Forty-ninth Congresses, Ballentine served from March 4, 1883 to March 3, 1887. He declined to be a candidate for renomination in 1886 and retired from active pursuits.

== Death ==
Ballentine died on November 23, 1915, at his home in Pulaski. He is buried in Maplewood Cemetery.

U.S. House of Representatives
Preceded by Washington C. Whitthorne	Member of the U.S. House of Representatives from Tennessee's 7th congressional district 1883-1887	Succeeded by Washington Whitthorne
