= Wright County War =

1859 lynching in Minnesota, US

- Part of Frontier Justice
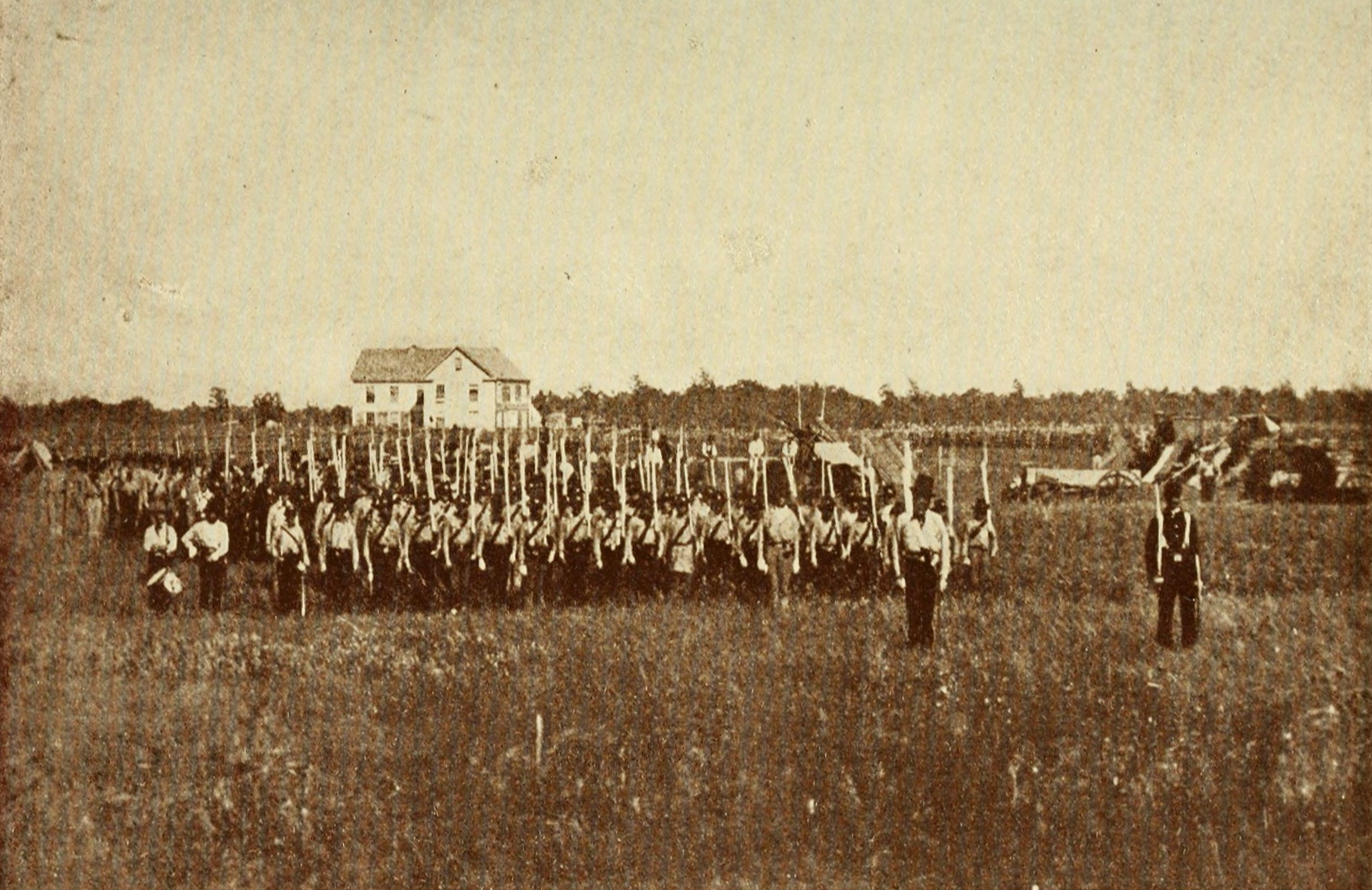
- Pioneer Guard of St. Paul at Big Lake, Minnesota in 1859
- Location: Near Lake Charlotte, Wright County, Minnesota, U.S.
- Date: April 1859 - July 1859
- Target: Oscar F. Jackson
- Attack type: Lynching
- Deaths: Oscar F. Jackson
- Perpetrators: Citizens of Rockford, Minnesota and Wright County
- Assailants: Amer Moore; Hiram S. Angell; John Edwin Jenks
- Motive: Retribution for the killing of Henry A. Wallace
- Verdict: Grand jury refuses to indict the 3 assailants, assailants set free on $500 bail

The Wright County War, also known as the Lynching of Oscar F. Jackson, was a public lynching and the extrajudicial killing of a sharecropper, Oscar F. Jackson, by a mob in Rockford, Minnesota on April 25, 1859, for the murder of Henry A. Wallace. The death of Henry A. Wallace was never resolved and it remains a longstanding unsolved case in Minnesota. The death of Jackson is the first recorded incident of a lynching in the state of Minnesota. The affair is also the first time in Minnesota state history where the Governor of Minnesota Henry Hastings Sibley declared Wright County to be in a state of insurrection and utilized the Minnesota militia to bring back order to Wright County.

== Background ==
In 1858 Henry A. Wallace, a wealthy settler to the newly established state of Minnesota came to Rockford Township in Wright County, Minnesota to erect a cabin on his land claim alongside Amos Moore near Lake Charlotte.^{:194} Other neighbors in Wallace and Moore's vicinity were the Jackson family; Oscar F. Jackson, his wife Elizabeth, and Jackson's father-in-law George Holdship.^{:194} Wallace was elected as Rockford Township's Assessor while Oscar F. Jackson was elected as the Township's supervisor and the justice of the peace.^{:195} On September 21, 1858, Wallace was found dead in a cluster of willow trees with a mortal head injury. According to reports Wallace was last seen with Oscar Wall on August 27, he had been hired as a sharecropper to help Wallace harvest hay on his land claim.^{:196}

== The arrest and trial of Oscar F. Jackson ==
Many township citizens and neighbors suspected Jackson to be the primary suspect for the murder of Wallace. Despite Wallace's disappearance Jackson appeared to be rather unconcerned about the entire affair, as displayed to others when Jackson refused to join in the search party to look for Wallace after his disappearance.

Jackson was arrested in October 1858, in Rockford.^{:196} Jackson was imprisoned in Ramsey County and tried in a local district court but was found innocent by a jury.^{:196-197} Jackson was released from custody following a not guilty verdict on April 3, 1859. This verdict did not settle well with the populace of Wright County, however, including Wallace's brother Hiram, who still felt that Jackson was guilty for the murder of Wallace. Wright County Sheriff Bertram and justice of the peace, Cyrus Jenks, also sympathized with the citizens of Wright County and did not want to let the murder go unpunished.

== The lynching of Oscar F. Jackson ==
Five days later on April 8, 1859, three men; Hiram, Jenks, and Bertram went in search of Jackson in Hennepin County, Minnesota, and it was here where Hiram accused Jackson of theft, with Jenks then issuing a warrant for Jackson's arrest. Sheriff Bertram issued the arrest warrant to Hennepin County Deputy Sheriff Alfred Bruce Brackett who in turn arrested Jackson at the Apollo Saloon in Saint Paul, Minnesota. On April 11, 1859, judge Isaac Atwater, a state supreme court justice, ordered for Jackson's release alongside a hastily written writ of habeas corpus.

Jackson fled to his father-in-law's house and on April 24, a mob tracked Jackson to his father-in-law's farmstead and surrounded the house demanding for Jackson to surrender himself to the mob. Wright County Sheriff Bertram swore to Jackson that he would not allow him to be harmed if Jackson agreed to be arrested, which Jackson agreed to. A mile away from the farm the mob overtook Sheriff Bertram's wagon, which Bertram relinquished without resistance and proceeded to not report the incident to his deputies. The mob promptly lynched Jackson from the gable of Wallace's cabin. A jury was assembled the same day which concluded the following:

"We, the undersigned, composing a coroner's Jury on the body of Oscar F. Jackson, do agree that the deceased came to his death on the 25th day of April, 1859 by hanging by the neck; and that it was done by some person or persons, unknown to this Jury. -Signed John M. Keeler, foreman, A. Ackley, James Gilbert, O. L. Dudley, C. Champlin, J. U. Freed".

== Governor Sibley's response ==
On April 29, 1859, Governor of Minnesota Henry Hastings Sibley declared that the killing of Jackson was a "high-handed outrage against the peace and dignity of the state" and offered a $500 reward for the names of those connected with the lynching.

The $500 reward went unclaimed until July 1859 when Oscar's wife Elizabeth saw Emery W. Moore at Minnehaha Falls, Moore was one of the suspected perpetrators of the lynch mob. Moore was later arrested by the authorities and sent to Rockford. Before Moore could be tried for murder however, he was set free by a group of roughly 40 vigilantes.

Sibley later declared a state of emergency and sent the state militia to Rockford and Wright County. The militia units sent to Wright County were; the Stillwater Guards, the Pioneer Guards, St. Paul City Guards, Dakota Rifles, Washington Light Artillery, and the St. Paul Light Cavalry. The militia also included thirty five police. It was not until the state militia and police interrogated citizens until they found three of the mob assailants responsible for Jackson's lynching, these people were; Amer W. Moore, Hiram S. Angell, and John Edwin Jenks.

== Aftermath ==
The three purported assailants were each acquitted due to a hung jury which refused to indict each of the accused. The three assailants were each released with a bond of $500.

== See also ==
- Frontier justice
- Duluth lynchings
- Extrajudicial killing
- Public execution
