= William Kellogg (Illinois politician) =

American politician

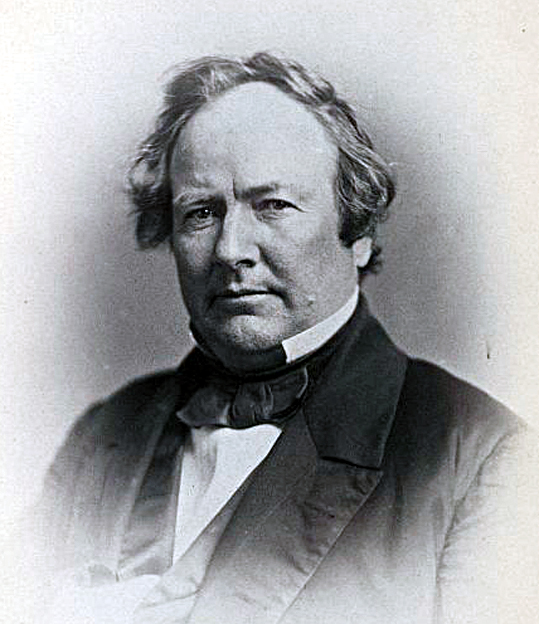
- Hon. William Kellogg photographed by Julian Vannerson in 1859

Member of the U.S. House of Representatives from Illinois's 4th district
- In office March 4, 1857 – March 3, 1863
- Preceded by: James Knox
- Succeeded by: Charles M. Harris

Member of the Illinois House of Representatives
- In office 1849–1850

Personal details
- Born: July 8, 1814 Ashtabula County, Ohio, US
- Died: December 20, 1872 (aged 58) Peoria, Illinois, US
- Resting place: Springdale Cemetery and Mausoleum; Peoria, Illinois
- Party: Republican
- Spouse: Lucinda Caroline Ross (1821–1900)
- Children: 5
- Occupation: Lawyer, judge

William Kellogg (July 8, 1814 – December 20, 1872) was a U.S. representative from Illinois and chief justice of the Territorial Supreme Court of the Nebraska Territory.

== Personal life and early career ==
William Kellogg was born in Ashtabula County, Ohio, on July 8, 1814. After attending local public schools, he studied law and was admitted to the bar. He moved to Canton, Illinois in about 1839 and commenced a law practice in partnership with Asa Lee Davidson, with a specialty in criminal law. Leonard F. Ross, who later served as a brigadier general in the American Civil War, studied law with the firm of Davidson and Kellogg.

On December 21, 1843, William Kellogg married Lucinda Caroline Ross, daughter of Ossian M. Ross and Mary Winans, and sister of General Leonard F. Ross, in Fulton County, Illinois. Lucinda Ross had the distinction of being the first white child born in Fulton County. The couple had five children: William, Jr., and John (both of whom were lawyers), Paulina, and Emma and Lucinda (who were twins).

== Political service and later career ==
William Kellogg served as a member of the Illinois House of Representatives in 1849 and 1850. He then served as a judge of the Illinois tenth circuit court from 1850 to 1852. Kellogg was elected as a Republican to the Thirty-fifth, Thirty-sixth, and Thirty-seventh Congresses (March 4, 1857–March 3, 1863).

While in congress, Kellogg was an active participant in discussions related to the onset of the American Civil War. On December 4, 1860, Kellogg was appointed to the Committee of Thirty-Three of the U. S. House of Representatives. This committee consisted of one representative from each state and was tasked with drafting a proposal aimed at averting a civil war following Abraham Lincoln's election to the presidency. On February 8, 1861, Kellogg presented an address to the House in which he proposed a substitute for the propositions submitted by the Committee of Thirty-Three. His proposal, which was essentially a modified version of the Crittenden Compromise, was reportedly prepared in a secret consultation with Abraham Lincoln in late January 1861. Kellogg was criticized for this speech both by his Republican colleagues and by his constituents, in part because his proposal allowed slavery to continue south of latitude thirty-six degrees and thirty minutes in both the states and territories. On May 24, 1862, Kellogg presented an address to the House in which he supported a bill "to confiscate the property and free from servitude the slaves of rebels" during the civil war.

During the Thirty-sixth and Thirty-seventh Congresses, Kellogg served as a member of the House Committee on the Judiciary. In January 1863, Kellogg submitted a report to this committee in which he supported the authority of the postmaster general to deny the transmittal of certain newspapers through the mails of the United States. In this report, he concurred with the postmaster general's assertion that these newspapers constituted treasonable matter.

In 1864, following his term in Congress, William Kellogg was nominated by President Abraham Lincoln to be Minister to Guatemala, but he refused the appointment. Lincoln subsequently nominated Kellogg to the position of chief justice of the territorial supreme court of the Nebraska Territory. Following Lincoln's assassination, Kellogg's nomination was approved by the U. S. Senate and by President Andrew Johnson, and Kellogg served as chief justice of the Nebraska Territory from 1865 to 1867. His predecessor in that position was his distant cousin, William Pitt Kellogg, who later became the governor of Louisiana. Following his service as chief justice, William Kellogg was appointed by President Johnson as collector of internal revenue for the Peoria district, a position that he held from 1867 to 1869. During this period, Kellogg also returned to the practice of law, in partnership with his oldest son William, Jr., in Peoria. In 1871, William Kellogg was retained by the Distiller's National Convention to provide legal counsel to that organization.

== Death and legacy ==
William Kellogg died in Peoria, Illinois, on December 20, 1872, and was interred in Springdale Cemetery and Mausoleum in that city.

In 1879, the Kellogg family residence at the corner of Main Street and Flora Avenue in Peoria was sold and converted to the Home for the Friendless, a children's home under the direction of the Women's Christian Home Mission of Peoria. The Kellogg's son William, Jr., served as a state's attorney from 1872 to 1880. Their daughter Paulina was the wife of Judge Lawrence W. James, who was a prominent Illinois lawyer and judge of the Illinois eighth circuit court.

U.S. House of Representatives
Preceded by James Knox	Member of the U.S. House of Representatives from Illinois's 4th congressional district 1853-1857	Succeeded by Charles M. Harris
