= Charles M. Harris =

American politician

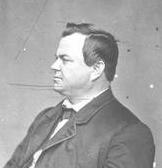
- Harris c. 1865

Member of the U.S. House of Representatives from Illinois's 4th district
- In office March 4, 1863 – March 3, 1865
- Preceded by: William Kellogg
- Succeeded by: Abner C. Harding

Personal details
- Born: April 10, 1821 Munfordville, Kentucky
- Died: September 20, 1896 (aged 75) Chicago, Illinois
- Party: Democratic

Charles Murray Harris (April 10, 1821 – September 20, 1896) was a U.S. representative from Illinois. Born in Munfordville, Kentucky, Harris attended the common schools. He studied law. He was admitted to the bar. He moved to Illinois and located in Oquawka, Illinois, where he commenced the practice of his profession. Harris was elected as a Democrat to the Thirty-eighth Congress (March 4, 1863 – March 3, 1865). He was an unsuccessful candidate for reelection in 1864 to the Thirty-ninth Congress. He died in Chicago, Illinois, September 20, 1896. He was interred in Oquawka, Illinois.

U.S. House of Representatives
Preceded by William Kellogg	Member of the U.S. House of Representatives from Illinois's 4th congressional district 1863-1865	Succeeded by Abner C. Harding
