= Battle of Paris (Tennessee) =

1862 battle of the American Civil War

- Part of the American Civil War
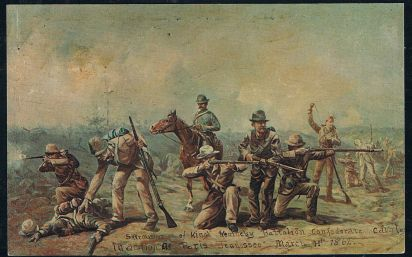
- The Battle of Paris by Frederick Ruple c.1925
Date	March 11, 1862
Location	Paris, Tennessee 36°18.075′N 88°21.148′W
Result	Confederate victory

Belligerents
United States (Union)	(Confederate States of America) Confederate States

Commanders and leaders
(United States) Captain John Thorn Croft	(Confederate States of America) Major Henry Clay King

Units involved
Companies A, B, C, & D of the 5th Iowa Cavalry Regiment; Battery I of the 1st Missouri Light Artillery Regiment	King's 1st Kentucky Battalion; Stack's Company of Tennessee Cavalry; McCutchan's Company of Tennessee Cavalry

Strength
4 Companies of Cavalry (roughly 250 men); 1 Artillery Battery	450-500 (Union estimates)

Casualties and losses
4 Killed, 5 Wounded, 1 Captured (Union Report)	20 Killed or Wounded, 8 Captured (Union Report)

The Battle of Paris, also known as the Expedition to Paris, was a battle fought on March 11, 1862, in the Western Theater of the American Civil War. The battle took place near modern-day Paris, Tennessee located in Henry County.

The battle although brief, was a bloody engagement for the defending Confederate elements of Colonel Henry Clay King's 1st Kentucky Cavalry Battalion.

== Background ==
With the Union Army's victories at both Battle of Fort Donelson and the Battle of Fort Henry in early February 1862, Union troops began to advance deeper into northwestern Tennessee. On March 11, 1862, Major General Ulysses S. Grant dispatched a small cavalry battalion in the direction of Paris, Tennessee under the command of Captain John Thorn Croft of Company B of the 5th Iowa Cavalry Regiment to perform reconnaissance. Company B was primarily made up of volunteers from Nebraska Territory and had previously been known as "Patrick's 1st Battalion of Nebraska Cavalry" under Captain Matthewson T. Patrick before being combined with several Iowa, Minnesota, and Nebraska units and dubbed the "5th Iowa". Croft's detachment consisted of the 1st Battalion (companies A, B, C, and D) of the 5th Iowa Cavalry and Battery I (Company I) or "Buel's Independent Battery" of the 1st Missouri Light Artillery Regiment under the command of First Lieutenant Charles H. Thurber. Previous to Croft, the 1st Battalion of the 5th Iowa was commanded by Major William Kelsay, who died of typhoid fever on February 28, 1862, and was buried with military honors at Fort Heiman.

Confederate forces that had been encamped in and around Paris were under the command of Colonel Henry Clay King (1831–1903) of the 1st Kentucky Cavalry Battalion, also called "King's" Kentucky Cavalry Battalion. Other units under King's command were Captain Stack's company of Tennessee Cavalry (unattached) and Captain McCutchan's company of Tennessee Cavalry (unattached).

Confederate forces were massed in and around the city of Paris because Paris was vital to the Confederate communication lines and road networks to other nearby communities such as Dresden and Como. Paris was also a central hub between Confederate Fort Henry and Fort Donelson with the Confederate command centered in Columbus, Kentucky. According to Tennessee Civil War Trials when Fort Henry and Fort Donelson fell in federal detachments were quickly sent to Paris in order to save Tennessee Unionist citizens from potential impressment into the Confederate military.

== Battle ==
On the morning of March 11, 1862 around 11:00am while the reconnaissance force of the 5th Iowa advanced towards Paris two mounted Confederate pickets were spotted by the battalion several miles near the outskirts of Paris. Captain Bullis of the 1st Missouri Light Artillery arrived with his battery and Captain Croft moved forward without waiting for the arrival of the other two battalions of the 5th Iowa. It was not until 5:00pm that the 1st Battalion under Croft reached Paris and proceeded with an attack on the Confederate pickets.

Captain Croft instructed Lieutenant Frederick A. Williams of Company A from Whitestown, Indiana, and a detail of 20 men to continue on to Paris and secure the road for the rest of the battalion. Within 300 yards of the town, Lieutenant Williams was ambushed by an outlying picket which surrounded him and he was forced to surrender. Thurber's battery fired upon Confederate positions with both round shot and canister shot causing fires to break out in the Confederate encampment inside Paris according to Thurber's report. According to the book The Roster and Record of Iowa Soldiers in the War of the Rebellion the battle is described as the following:

"After a few rounds had been fired, Captain Lower, with Companies A and B, made a charge upon the enemy's line but encountered fallen timber, behind which the enemy was posted, and was compelled to fall back under a severe fire and rejoin the main force. The guns were then all placed in position, and, after a heavy and rapid fire had for some time been directed against the enemy's position, his line was seen to waiver and give way".

Croft's detachment soon learned that King's 1st Kentucky Cavalry Battalion were soon to be reinforced with infantry and was hence compelled to withdrawal from Paris back to Fort Heiman. The next day Croft met with Lieutenant Colonel Patrick, who had crossed the river the day before with the 2nd and 3rd Battalions, about three miles from Fort Heiman. Although much of the Confederate camp was decimated the skirmish is considered a Confederate victory.

== Casualties ==
Although a short skirmish there is an estimated loss of around 38 soldiers total who were killed or wounded and captured. The Historical Marker Databased for Paris in henry County, Tennessee states that there were 20 Confederates and 60 to 80 Federals (Union) soldiers killed or wounded before the Federals withdrew. Union losses however, were only reported as minor in the after action report with 4 killed, 5 wounded, and 1 captured. Ulysses S. Grant's official report likewise states "4 men killed and 5 men wounded. We have taken 8 prisoners".

== Legacy ==
A commemorative plaque marking the site of the battle exists in Paris, Tennessee today. The marker itself was erected by the Tennessee Historical Commission (Marker Number 4A 29).

== See also ==
- 5th Iowa Volunteer Cavalry
- Battle of Lockridge Mill
