= USS Conestoga =

Three ships of the United States Navy have been named Conestoga after the Conestoga wagon, a broad wheeled, covered, wagon first built in Conestoga, Pennsylvania.

- USS Conestoga (1861), a side-wheeled steamer, was purchased in June 1861. She served on the Mississippi River and its tributaries during the American Civil War. On the night of 8 March 1864 Conestoga collided with USS General Price and sank immediately.
- USS Conestoga was the planned name for the monitor USS Sangamon (1862) and the name was changed while the ship was still on the stocks. She served in the American Civil War and later served in the Spanish–American War as Jason.
- USS Conestoga (AT-54), commissioned 10 November 1917, was lost at sea under unknown circumstances in 1921. The fate of the vessel was a mystery until the wreck was identified in 2016.
