= Battle of Lockridge Mill =

Skirmish in the American civil war

- Part of the Western Theater of the American Civil War
Date	May 6, 1862
Location	Palmersville, Tennessee 36°25.77′N 88°39.88′W
Result	Confederate victory

Belligerents
United States (Union)	(Confederate States of America) Confederate States

Commanders and leaders
(United States) Major Carl Schaeffer Boernstein †	(Confederate States of America) Colonel Thomas Claiborne (Confederate States of America) Colonel William Hicks Jackson

Units involved
Companies E, F, & G of the 5th Iowa Cavalry Regiment	7th Tennessee Cavalry Regiment

Strength
3 Companies of Cavalry (roughly 125 - 130 men)	1,250 - 2,000 (estimates vary)

Casualties and losses
6 Killed, 16 Wounded, 71 Captured (Confederate Report); 4 Killed, 12 Wounded, 60 Captured (Union Report)	None Killed; Several wounded including John Goff Ballentine

The Battle of Lockridge Mill or the Battle of Lockridge's Mills, also called Skirmish near Lockridge's Mill was a skirmish fought on May 6, 1862, in the Western Theater of the American Civil War. The skirmish took place near modern-day Palmersville, Tennessee. The skirmish derives its name from the ford and gristmill on the nearby northern fork of the Obion River owned by Marshall Lockridge.

== Background ==
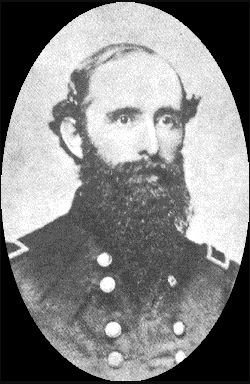
Colonel William Warren Lowe of the 5th Iowa Cavalry Regiment.

=== 5th Iowa Cavalry Regiment ===
After the successful capture of Paris, Tennessee in March, 1862 Colonel William Warren Lowe of the 5th Iowa Cavalry Regiment, at the time nicknamed the "Curtis Horse", detached several of his cavalry companies to different areas of central and western Tennessee. On March 27, 1862, a detachment of cavalry led by Alfred Bruce Brackett were sent to Savannah, Tennessee to protect telegraph wires of the U.S. Military Telegraph Corps. Brackett's detachment was later sent to Fort Heiman on August 29, 1862. Other detachments of the 5th Iowa were also operating in western Tennessee under Colonel Lowe. Up until this point in time the 5th Iowa Cavalry Regiment had not yet taken part in any battles.

Following the Battle of Shiloh Colonel Lowe ordered a detachment led by Carl Schaeffer Boernstein, a veteran of the 1st Iowa Infantry Regiment, to perform reconnaissance in the direction of Dresden and Como, Tennessee. Major Boernstein's officers included; Captain Charles C. Nott (Company E), Captain William A. Haw (Company F), and Captain Henning Von Minden (Company G). Roughly two-thirds of Boernstein's command were Germans.

Boernsein's force was ordered to travel to Henry Station to intercept the supplies, they were successful in this endeavor and captured roughly $15,000 worth of food along with other military supplies. On May 3, 1862, Colonel Lowe ordered Boernsein's detachment to travel to Como, Tennessee in order to intercept a wagon train of supplies including medicine which was stolen by Confederate forces in Paducah, Kentucky. While at Como the column found no trace of the wagon train an set up camp. Meanwhile, Captain Nott and 25 men stayed behind the main column to capture any guerrilla fighters following them. The column later continued westward towards the direction of Dresden, Tennessee. While staying behind Notts ascertained that there was a significant force of nearly 3,000 Confederate cavalry marching towards Paris, Tennessee.

=== Confederate interception ===
P. G. T. Beauregard had planned to raid Paris and sent elements of the 7th Tennessee Cavalry Regiment, under the overall command of Colonel Thomas Claiborne and Colonel William Hicks Jackson, some 1,250 men in total. Claiborne and his battalion reached Trenton, Tennessee on May 2, when they received word that Colonel Jackson, along with the 7th Tennessee Cavalry Regiment, were on their way to McKenzie's Station to support them.

While on his way towards Paducah Claiborne was warned of Borenstein's detachment, Clairborne decided to intercept the Union cavalry detachment before his movements could be reported by Borenstein. Clairborne's column was broken up into 3 separate detachments; one flanking detachment commanded by James Pell, one vanguard column commanded by Jackson, and the main attacking column commanded by Claiborne himself.

=== Encampment at Lockridge Mill ===
On the evening of May 6, 1862 while heading towards Dresden Borenstein's column came across the Lockridge Mill, a 400 acre farm and gristmill on the Obion River 12 miles north of Dresden which was owned by Marshall Lockridge and was operated by a large number of slaves. Borenstein's column set up a bivouac at Lockridge's property and detailed 45 men to set up three lines of pickets along the southern outer perimeter near the Dresden-Mayfield Road to safeguard the dismounted cavalry from surprise attacks. One of several mistakes Borenstein made during this time was placing one of the pickets, Company F under Captain William A. Haw, nearly half a mile away (.08 km) from the main camp. Another mistake was ignoring the advice of his subordinate officers to set up their encampment on the northern side of the river, Borenstein instead chose to camp to the south of side of the river which allowed his force to be easily overwhelmed.

== Battle ==
Around 5:30pm on May 6, 1862, as the final picket post was being organized and the cavalrymen made their supper and watered their horses they were suddenly attacked by Confederate mounted skirmishers under the command of Confederate Colonel Claiborne. The Union pickets did not have enough time to warn the main encampment of the Confederate skirmishers as they were mounted and within 70 yards by the time they engaged. As the men of the 5th Iowa scrambled to saddle their horses Major Boernstein ordered the column to retreat back across the Obion River and destroy the bridge. During the ensuing chaos Major Boernstein was nowhere to be found, Captain Charles C. Nott of Company E took command of several squadrons and attempted to rally the panic stricken cavalrymen into line, but to no avail.

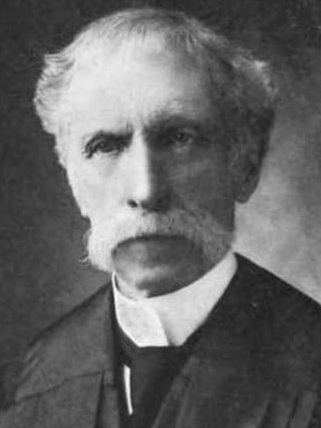
Charles C. Nott commanded Company E during the skirmish, he assumed command after the disappearance of Major Boernstein

Nott ordered the remainder of the detachment to retreat towards the Dresden-Mayfield road. The majority of the command along with much of the 5th Iowa were able to cross the bridge, however, several of the company commanders were wounded or captured including Captains Haw and Von Minden, the same was true for many of the non-commissioned officers and enlisted men. Nott, although severely wounded, was able to escape with fifty eight men and forty eight horses to Paducah. Nott later returned to Lockridge Mill in October 1862 and remarked "What a strong position it is! How easily we could have held it, had we been armed like the enemy".

== Aftermath ==
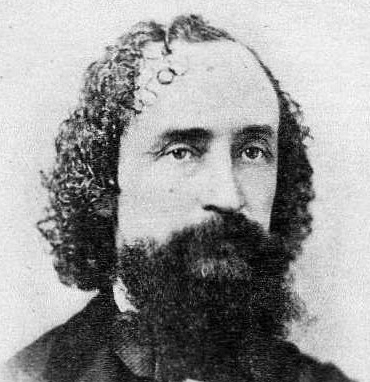
Tennessee Congressman John Goff Ballentine who wounded Major Boernstein.

During the chaos Boernstein was wounded in a saber fight with Confederate officer John Goff Ballentine. Both Boernstein and Ballentine were wounded in the ensuing saber duel during the skirmish and taken to Dresden in the same wagon. Before his death Boernstein awarded Captain Ballentine his horse, pistol, and saber as his lawful spoils of war, he later died on May 7, 1862, from his wounds. Boernstein's death was a hard loss to the regiment. Boernstein's body was taken back to his home in Dubuque, Iowa.

Casualties of the 5th Iowa Cavalry vary dependent on the source, Colonel Claiborne's official report states, "Killed 6, wounded 16, and captured 4 officers and 67 non-commissioned officers and privates".^{:11} Claiborne also captured two wagons, 56 horses, and many small arms of the 5th Iowa Cavalry. Colonel Lowe's official report states: 1 Officer killed, 3 Officers wounded, 1 non-commissioned officer wounded, 3 privates killed, 2 privates wounded.

Colonel Lowe confirms that the majority were taken prisoner stating "Our loss in prisoners cannot as yet be actually ascertained, but will, I presume, number about 60, as Captain Nott has reached Paducah with 58 men and 48 horses". The prisoners of the 5th Iowa Cavalry were first sent to Jackson, Mississippi and later to Corinth, Mississippi where they were paroled and exchanged on May 15, 1862. The officers of the detachment including Captain William A. Haw, Captain Henning Von Minden, and Lieutenant Richard Van Vredenburgh however were all held in captivity until October 15, 1862.

Claiborne claimed that he took no casualties during the skirmish in his official report stating "the loss on our side was not one; a few scratches were received". Contrasting this statement are Captain Ballentine, Sergeant R.J. Black, and Private O'Kelly who would all require medical attention due to the skirmish.

== Legacy ==
A commemorative plaque marks the site of the Battle of Lockridge Mill near Palmersville in Weakley County, Tennessee. The marker itself was erected by the Tennessee Historical Commission (Marker Number 4A 44). The marker is at the intersection of Tennessee State Route 190 at milepost 34 and West New Hope Church Road, on the right when traveling north on Tennessee Route 190.
