= 2nd Mississippi Partisan Rangers =

Cavalry regiment of the Confederate States Army

- Active: 1862–1865
- Country: Confederate States
- Allegiance: Mississippi
- Branch: Army
- Type: Partisan Rangers; Cavalry
- Size: Regiment
- Part of: Armstrong's Brigade
- Facings: Yellow
- Battles: American Civil War: Battle of Thompson's Station; Battle of Franklin (1863); Meridian Campaign; Atlanta Campaign; Franklin-Nashville Campaign; Battle of Selma

Commanders
- Notable commanders: John G. Ballentine

The 2nd Mississippi Partisan Rangers, also known as Ballentine's Regiment, was a unit of the Confederate Army the American Civil War. The 2nd Partisans operated as a cavalry regiment in North Mississippi and Tennessee, taking part in many battles and skirmishes before surrendering in Alabama in May, 1865.

== Formation ==
The regiment was formed in 1862 by John G. Ballentine, a graduate of Harvard Law School and veteran of the 7th Tennessee Cavalry. When his Tennessee unit was reorganized, Ballentine recruited a new regiment in North Mississippi and West Tennessee officially designated as the 2nd Mississippi Partisan Rangers but more often referred to simply as "Ballentine's Regiment".

The Confederate Congress had passed the Partisan Ranger Act in April, 1862 to authorize the formation of irregular guerilla units, with the intention of sparking resistance to Federal authority in Union-controlled regions such as West Virginia. Partisan Ranger units were subject to the same regulations as regular Confederate Army troops, but in addition to their regular pay, they also received a bounty from the government for any captured Federal arms they turned over to army quartermasters. In contrast to resistance fighters in modern conflicts, Confederate Partisan Rangers wore military uniforms, were subject to the regular chain of command, and were enrolled as soldiers in the army. However, professional soldiers such as Robert E. Lee believed that Partisan Ranger units wasted manpower that could be directed to the more effective regular army. Excessive violence by partisan leaders such as William Quantrill and "Bloody" Bill Anderson damaged the reputation of these units and led the Confederacy to repeal the Partisan Ranger Act in February 1864. To prevent the flow of men eligible for conscription into partisan service, the army passed new regulations in the summer of 1862 prohibiting transfer from regular units to Partisan Ranger units, and required a minimum age of 35 to join partisan companies.

As part of General Earl Van Dorn's cavalry force, Ballentine's regiment fought at Thompson's Station and the skirmish at Franklin in the spring of 1863. Back in their home state, the regiment joined General Joseph E. Johnston's army of relief in the later stages of the Vicksburg Campaign and fought against Union General William T. Sherman's troops during the Meridian campaign. The regiment fought in Georgia during the Atlanta Campaign and in Tennessee during the Franklin-Nashville Campaign as part of Forrest's Cavalry Corps.

Following the Confederate defeats in Tennessee in 1864, the 2nd Partisan Rangers withdrew into Mississippi with Forrest's troops. On February 22, 1865, the regiment was consolidated with the 7th Mississippi, another former partisan ranger unit. The final battle of this consolidated unit took place at the Battle of Selma in Alabama on April 2, and Forrest's cavalry corps surrendered on May 22.

== Commanders ==
Commanders of the 2nd Mississippi Partisan Rangers:

- Col. John G. Ballentine
- Lt. Col. William L. Maxwell

== Organization ==
Companies of the 2nd Mississippi Partisan Rangers:

- Company A, from Carroll County
- Company B, from Floyd, Louisiana
- Company C, from Memphis, Tennessee
- Company D, from Tennessee
- Company E, from Ripley
- Company F, from various North Mississippi towns
- Company G, from College Hill, Mississippi
- Company H, from Marshall County
- Company I, from Yalobusha County
- Company K, from Batesville

== See also ==
- List of Confederate units from Mississippi in the American Civil War
