= Abner C. Harding =

American politician and Civil War Brigadier General

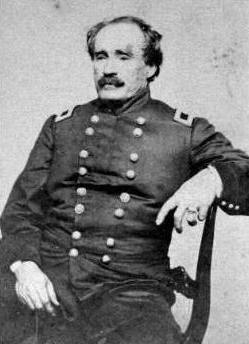

Member of the U.S. House of Representatives from Illinois's 4th district
- In office March 4, 1865 – March 3, 1869
- Preceded by: Charles M. Harris
- Succeeded by: John B. Hawley

Personal details
- Born: February 10, 1807 East Hampton, Connecticut
- Died: July 19, 1874 (aged 67) Monmouth, Illinois
- Resting place: Monmouth Cemetery, Monmouth, Illinois
- Party: Republican

Military service
- Allegiance: United States of America; Union
- Branch/service: United States Army; Union Army
- Years of service: 1862–1863
- Rank: Brigadier General
- Battles/wars: American Civil War; Battle of Dover

Abner Clark Harding (February 10, 1807 – July 19, 1874) was a U.S. representative from Illinois and a Brigadier General in the U.S. army fighting for the North in the Civil War.

== Biography ==
Abner C. Harding was born in East Hampton, Connecticut on February 10, 1807. He attended Hamilton College, Clinton, New York, where he studied law. He was admitted to the bar and commenced practice in Oneida County, New York, about 1827. In 1838, he moved to Monmouth, Illinois, and continued practicing law. He served as member of the State constitutional convention in 1848, and was elected to the Illinois House of Representatives the same year, serving until 1850.

During the American Civil War, Harding enlisted as a private in the Union Army in the 83rd Illinois Volunteer Infantry Regiment. Later he was commissioned as a colonel, and was promoted to brigadier general in March 1863. He distinguished himself when the Union army defeated the Confederates in the Battle of Dover (1863). His 800 troops held off 2500 Confederates and resulted in the Union controlling Middle Tennessee. He resigned due to deteriorating eyesight a few months later.

From 1865 to 1869, Harding served as a Republican member of Congress. During the 39th Congress, he served as Chairman of the Committee on the Militia. However, he was not a candidate for re-election in 1868 after serving in the 40th Congress, and later engaged in banking and railroad building. He was a founder and trustee of Monmouth College. He died in Monmouth, Illinois on July 19, 1874, and was interred in Monmouth Cemetery.

== See also ==
- List of American Civil War generals (Union)

U.S. House of Representatives
Preceded by Charles M. Harris	Member of the U.S. House of Representatives from Illinois's 4th congressional district 1865-1869	Succeeded by John B. Hawley
