= Fort Donelson =

Confederate fort near Dover, Tennessee during the American Civil War

Coordinates: 36°29′35″N 87°51′18″W

- Tennessee (near Dover, Tennessee)
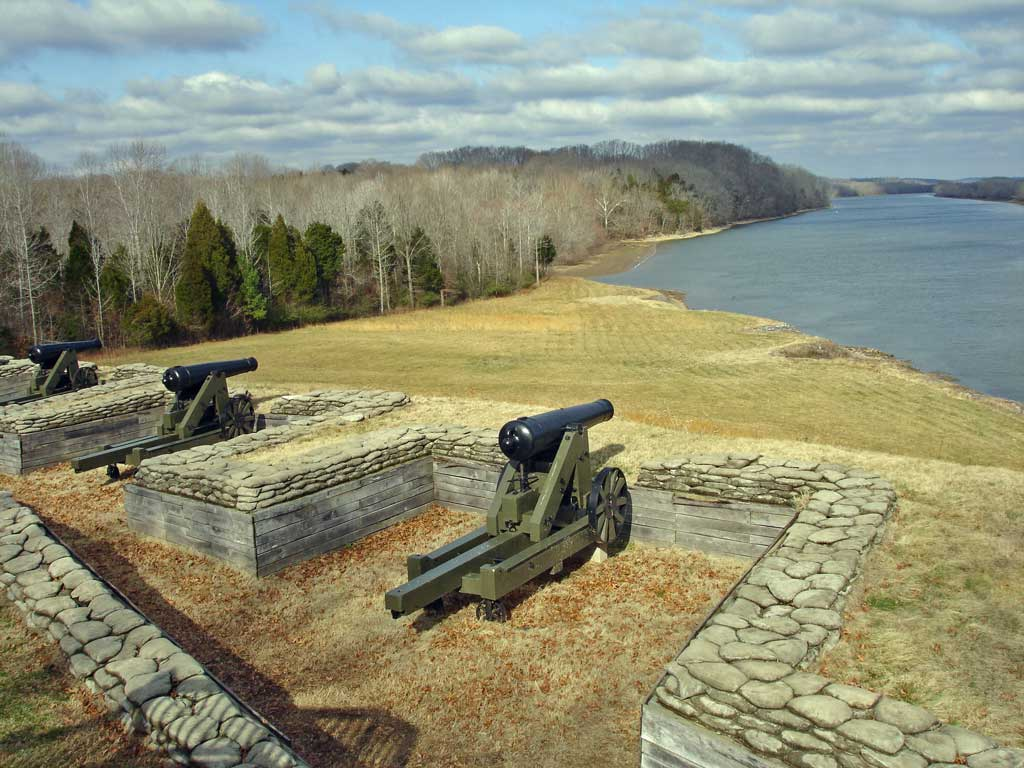
- Part of the lower river battery at Fort Donelson, overlooking the Cumberland River

Site information
- Type: Fort
- Controlled by: Confederate States (1862); United States (1862–1865)

Site history
- Built: 1862
- In use: 1862–1865
- Materials: earth
- Battles/wars: American Civil War: Battle of Fort Donelson; Battle of Dover

Fort Donelson was a fortress built early in 1862 by the Confederacy during the American Civil War to control the Cumberland River, which led to the heart of Tennessee, and thereby the Confederacy. The fort was named after Confederate general Daniel S. Donelson.

The Union Army of the Tennessee, commanded by Brigadier General Ulysses S. Grant, who later became president, captured the fort in February 1862 from the Confederate Army in the Battle of Fort Donelson. This was a great strategic victory for the Union forces, and part of Grant's campaign to gain control of the Mississippi River. Union forces occupied the fort (and much of Tennessee) for the remainder of the war. A small detachment of Confederate troops made one unsuccessful attempt in 1863 to regain it.

== History ==
Bushrod Johnson of the Confederate Corps of Engineers had approved the build site and supervised construction completed in early 1862. The site commanded a bend on the west side of the Cumberland River, It was planned to support Fort Henry, which was on a bend in the Tennessee River about 10 miles to the west. To the north flows Hickman River, a backwater channel that was impassable except by boat or bridge, and to the east a small tributary named Indian Creek enters the Cumberland. The fort, which was intended to house troops and protect the water batteries from sorties, had a few acres of log huts.

Like Fort Henry, which fell to Union troops on February 6, Fort Donelson could not defeat a large-scale assault, but officers wanted to be able hold the position as long as possible. Engineers began improving defensive positions by digging rifle pits along a ridgeline and breastworks were built in "a three-mile arc which inclosed [sic] the bluff on the north, and the county seat hamlet of Dover on the south, the main supply base." Cannons, including a 128-pounder and two 32-pounders, were placed atop the hundred-foot bluff within the arc. Construction was started by a large force of workers brought from the nearby Cumberland Iron Works.

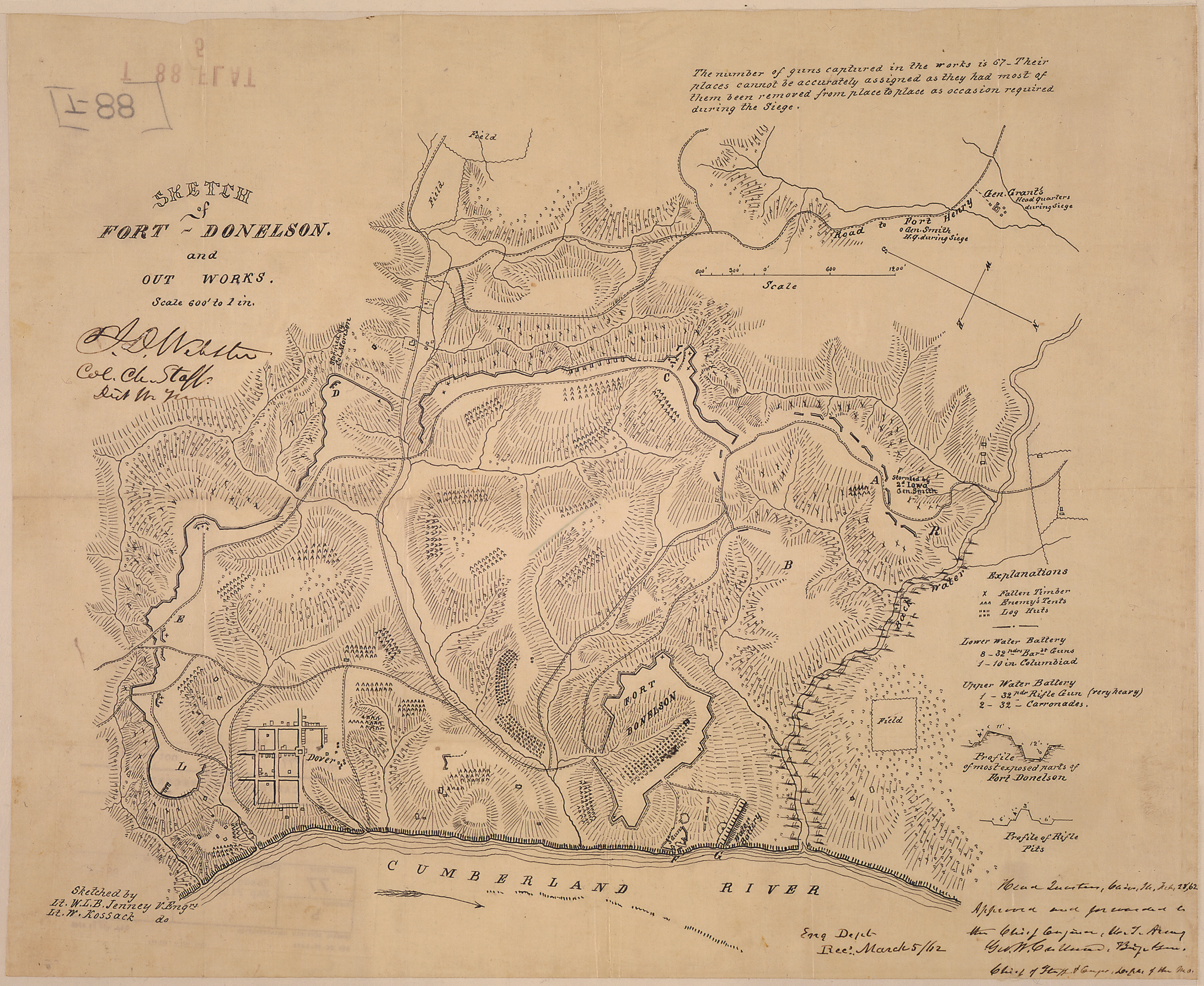
Sketch (map) of Fort Donelson and Out Works ... by Lt. W. L. B. Jenney, V. Engrs., (and) Lt. W. Kossack ... - NARA - 305690

Confederate commanders

- Bushrod Johnson (Feb 9, 1862)
- Gideon J. Pillow (Feb 10–13, 1862)
- John B. Floyd (Feb 14–16, 1862)
- Simon B. Buckner, Sr. (Feb 16, 1862)
- Major Rice E. Graves, Jr., Artillery Commander

Fort Donelson was garrisoned by the Confederate troops until 1862. The fort was captured by Union General Ulysses S. Grant and his army during a winter offensive to control of the Mississippi River. Grant believed that such control would enable him to divide the Confederacy in two. (see Battle of Fort Donelson)

=== Union attack ===
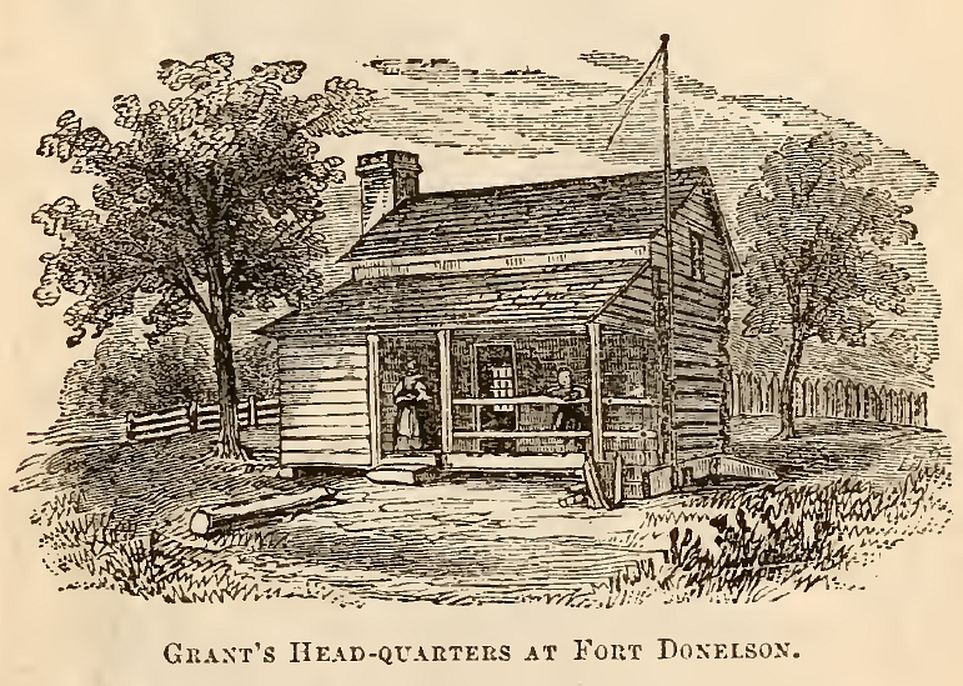
Grant's headquarters at Fort Donelson

Fort Donelson was attacked by General U.S Grant and Flag Officer Andrew Foote, who surrounded the fort and captured it after a short siege. On February 6, Grant was ordered by General Henry Halleck to assault Fort Donelson immediately and capture it by February 8. Grant made reconnaissance, observed the natural obstacles and Confederate improvements, and knew the fort would not be taken by the 8th. He organized and had Brigadier Generals John A. McClernand, Charles F. Smith, and Lew Wallace prepare for a land assault while Flag Officer Foote moved his gunboats to assault from the river. After minor skirmishes with Confederate cavalry en route, the assault on Fort Donelson began on February 12. On February 14, a naval battle took place, in which Union ships suffered serious damage. After attempting in vain to escape their tenuous position on February 15 via roads to Nashville, the Confederates capitulated, surrendering Fort Donelson to the Union on February 16.

=== Fort Donelson under Union control ===
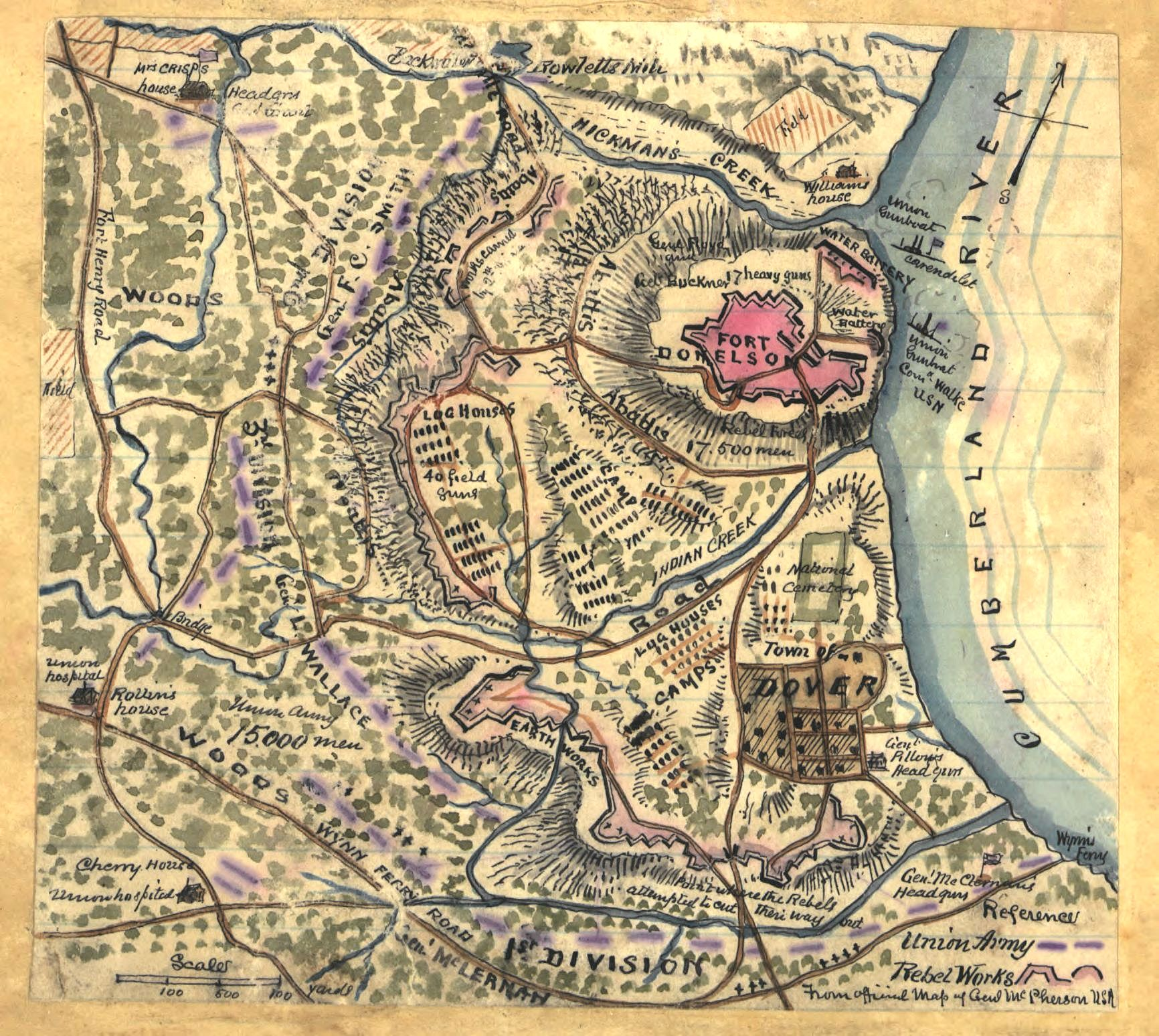
Map showing Fort Donelson and surrounding area during capture, with location of McClernand's headquarters, field guns, camp locations, earth works and town of Dover south of fort, along with several notations by military engineers

The Union was ecstatic when the news of Fort Donelson's surrender reached the capital and cities. Union forces now controlled one of the largest forts in the western theater. The war had been going badly for the Union in Virginia, but the captures of Fort Henry and Fort Donelson were promising victories.

After the front line shifted away from Fort Donelson, it became of little strategic importance, but continued to hold a garrison of Union troops.

On August 25, 1863, the fort was attacked by a Confederate force of 450 infantrymen, 335 cavalrymen, and two field guns. The Union garrison consisted of four companies (404 men) of the 71st Ohio Regiment. After suffering 30 casualties, the Confederates retreated. They were pursued by the Fifth Iowa Cavalry, but to no avail.

Union commanders

- Ulysses S. Grant (Feb 1862)
- Abner Harding (Sept 1862–1863)
- William W. Lowe (Feb 1863)

=== After the war ===
The Fort Donelson National Battlefield was created in 1928, and the park was listed on the National Register of Historic Places on October 15, 1966. It was redesignated as a national battlefield on August 16, 1985. Fort Heiman was later incorporated into the park.
