= 5th Iowa Cavalry Regiment =

- Iowa state flag
- Active: Dec. 20, 1861 – Aug. 11, 1865
- Country: United States
- Allegiance: Union
- Branch: Cavalry
- Engagements: American Civil War; Battle of Lockridge Mill (1862); Battle of Paris (1862); Siege of Corinth (1862); Battle of Riggins Hill (1862); Battle of Stones River (1862–63); Battle of Dover (1863); Wheeler's October 1863 Raid; Chattanooga campaign (1863); Atlanta campaign (1864); Battle of Spring Hill (1864); Battle of Franklin (1864); Battle of Nashville (1864); Battle of Selma (1865)

Commanders
- Colonel: William Warren Lowe
- Lieutenant Colonel: Matthewson T. Patrick
- Major: Carl Schaeffer Boernstein
- Major: William Kelsay
- Major: Alfred Bruce Brackett

The 5th Iowa Cavalry Regiment was a cavalry unit from Iowa that served in the Union Army during the American Civil War.

== History ==
The 5th Iowa Cavalry was originally raised as the "Curtis Horse" in Omaha, Nebraska, on September 5, 1861, and later absorbed cavalry companies from Iowa, Missouri and Minnesota and then transferred to Iowa state service per an order of December 20, 1861.

Original organization of regiment:
Company	Earliest Moniker	Primary Location of Recruitment	Earliest Captain
A	Patrick's 1st Battalion, Nebraska Cavalry	Omaha, Nebraska and Sidney, Iowa	Matthewson T. Patrick
B	Patrick's 1st Battalion, Nebraska Cavalry	Omaha, Nebraska and Mills County, Iowa	John T. Croft
C	Patrick's 1st Battalion, Nebraska Cavalry	Omaha, Nebraska City, and Page County, Iowa	John Morris Young
D	Patrick's 1st Battalion, Nebraska Cavalry	Omaha, Nebraska and Missouri	Harlon Baird
E	Frémont Hussars	Dubuque, Iowa	Charles C. Nott
F	Frémont Hussars	Fort Madison and Burlington, Iowa	Carl Schaeffer Boernstein
G	1st Company, Minnesota Light Cavalry or "Von Minden's Cavalry Company"	Fort Snelling and Saint Paul, Minnesota	Henning Von Minden
H	Frémont Hussars	Bellevue, Iowa	Jeremiah C. Wilcox
I	2nd Company, Minnesota Light Cavalry or "Blue Earth Cavalry"	Blue Earth County and Scott County, Minnesota	D. Mortimer West
K	3rd Company, Minnesota Light Cavalry or "Brackett's Cavalry Company"	Minneapolis–Saint Paul	Alfred Bruce Brackett
L	Naughton's Irish Dragoons	St. Louis and Jefferson City, Missouri	Patrick Naughton
M	Osage Independent Mounted Rifles or "Kidd's Company"	Osage County, Missouri	J. K. Kidd

=== Organization ===
Organized as Curtis Horse by order of General Fremont. Cos. "A," "B," "C" and "D" organized at Omaha, Neb., September 14 to November 13, 1861; "E" at Dubuque, Ia.; "F" in Missouri, as Fremont Hussars, October 25, 1861; "H" at Benton Barracks, Mo., December 28, 1861; "G," "I" and "K" as 1st, 2nd and 3rd Independent Companies, Minnesota Cavalry, at Fort Snelling, Minn., October 29 to December 20, 1861; "L" as Naughton's Irish Dragoons at Jefferson City, Mo., and "M" as Osage Rifles at St. Louis, Mo., November 1, 1861. Duty at Benton Barracks, Mo., until February, 1862. Moved to Fort Henry, Tenn., February 8–11. Patrol duty during battle of Fort Donelson. Expedition to destroy railroad bridge over Tennessee River February 14–16. Attached to Dept. of the Tennessee, Unassigned, to November, 1862. District of Columbus, Ky., 13th Corps, Dept. of Tennessee, to December, 1862. District of Columbus, 16th Corps, to June, 1863. 1st Brigade, 2nd Division, Cavalry Corps, Army of the Cumberland, to August, 1863. 3rd Brigade, 2nd Division, Cavalry Corps, Cumberland, to November, 1863. 1st Brigade, 2nd Division, Cavalry Corps, Cumberland, to April, 1864. 1st Brigade, 3rd Division Cavalry Corps, Cumberland, to November, 1864. 2nd Brigade, 6th Division, Wilson's Cavalry Corps, Military Division Mississippi, to December, 1864. 1st Brigade, 6th Division, Cavalry Corps, Military Division Mississippi, December, 1864. 2nd Brigade, 6th Division, Cavalry Corps, Military Division Mississippi, to February, 1865. 2nd Brigade, 4th Division, Wilson's Cavalry Corps, to June, 1865. Dept. of Georgia to August, 1865.

=== Service ===
Garrison duty at Forts Henry and Heiman until February 5, 1863. Skirmish, Agnew's Ferry, March 25, 1862 (Detachment of Co. "K"). Moved to Savannah, Tenn., March 28-April 1 (Cos. "G," "I" and "K"). Moved toward Nashville, Tenn., repairing roads and erecting telegraph lines April 3–6. Advance on and siege of Corinth, Miss., April 29-May 30. Acting as escort to Telegraph Corps. Expedition from Trenton to Paris and Dresden May 2–9. Dresden May 5. Lockridge's Mills May 5. Occupation of Corinth May 30. Pursuit to Booneville May 31-June 12. Designated 5th Iowa Cavalry June, 1862. Duty at Humboldt, Tenn., until August. Companies "G," "I" and "K" rejoin Regiment. Paris, Tenn., March 11, 1862 (1st Battalion). Expedition to Paris March 31-April 2 (Co. "F"). Near Fort Donelson August 23 (Detachment). Fort Donelson August 23. Cumberland Iron Works August 26. Expedition to Clarksville September 5–10. New Providence September 6 (Cos. "G," "I" and "K"). Clarksville September 7. Operations about Forts Donelson and Henry September 18–23. Near Lexington Landing October 1 (Detachment). Scout toward Eddyville October 29-November 10 (Cos. "G," "I" and "K"). Garrettsburg, Ky., November 6. Expedition from Fort Heiman December 18–28 (Cos. "G," "I" and "K"). Waverly January 16, 1863. Cumberland Iron Works, Fort Donelson, February 3, 1863. Moved to Fort Donelson February 5, and duty there until June 5. Destruction of Bridge, Mobile & Ohio Railroad, February 15. Paris, Tenn., March 14. Waverly April 10 (Detachment). Stewartsborough April 12 (1 co.). Moved to Murfreesboro and Nashville, Tenn., June 5–11, Scout on Middletown and Eaglesville Pike June 10. Expedition to Lebanon June 15–17. Lebanon June 16. Middle Tennessee (or Tullahoma) Campaign June 23-July 7. Guy's Gap, Fosterville, June 25. Fosterville June 27. Expedition to Huntsville July 13–22. Moved to McMinnsville September 6–8, and operating against Guerillas until October. Wartrace September 6. Operations against Wheeler and Roddy September 30-October 17. Garrison Creek near Fosterville October 6. Wartrace October 6. Sugar Creek October 9. Tennessee River October 10. At Maysville until January, 1864. Expedition from Maysville to Whitesburg and Decatur November 14–17, 1863, to destroy boats on the Tennessee River. Outpost duty on line of the Tennessee River, from south of Huntsville to Bellefonte November and December. Veteranize January, 1864. On Veteran furlough January 7 to April 24. Non-Veterans at Nashville, Tenn., until May. Companies "G," "I" and "K" detached February 25, 1864, and designated Brackett's Battalion, Minnesota Cavalry. Moved from Nashville to Pulaski and guard Nashville & Decatur Railroad until July. Moved to Decatur July 5. Rousseau's Opelika Raid from Decatur on West Point & Montgomery Railroad July 10–22. Near Coosa River July 13. Ten Island Ford, Coosa River, July 14. Chehaw Station, West Point & Montgomery Railroad July 18. Siege of Atlanta July 22-August 25. McCook's Raid on Atlanta & West Point Railroad July 27–31. Lovejoy Station July 29. Clear Creek July 30. Near Newnan August 15. Flank movement on Jonesboro August 25–30. Flint River Station August 30. Jonesboro Aug. 31-September 1. (5th Iowa Infantry consolidated with Regiment as Companies "G" and "I" September 1, 1864.) Lovejoy Station September 2–6. Operations against Hood in North Georgia and North Alabama September 29-November 3. Camp Creek September 30. Sweetwater and Noyes Creek, near Powder Springs October 1–3. Van Weft October 9. Nashville Campaign November–December. Columbia, Duck River, November 24–27. Crossing of Duck River November 28. Columbia Ford November 28–29. Battle of Nashville December 15–16. Pursuit of Hood December 17–28. Franklin and West Harpeth River December 17. Spring Hill December 18. Richland Creek December 24. King's Gap near Pulaski December 25. At Gravelly Springs, Ala., until March, 1865. Wilson's Raid on Macon, Ga., March 22-April 24. Near Elyton March 28. Near Montevallo March 31. Ebenezer Church, near Maysville April 1. Selma April 2. Montgomery April 12. Columbus, Ga., April 16. Capture of Macon April 20. Duty in North Georgia and at Nashville, Tenn., until August. Mustered out August 11, 1865.

Regiment lost during service 7 Officers 58 Enlisted men killed and mortally wounded and 2 Officers and 179 Enlisted men by disease. Total 246.

== Total strength and casualties ==
A total of 1625 men served in the 5th Iowa at one time or another during its existence. It suffered 7 officers and 58 enlisted men who were killed in action or who died of their wounds and 2 officers and 179 enlisted men who died of disease, for a total of 246 fatalities.

== Commanders ==
- Colonel William Warren Lowe

== See also ==
- List of Iowa Civil War units
- Iowa in the American Civil War
