= Battle of Dover (1863) =

Battle of the American Civil War

Coordinates: 36.48485°N 87.85747°W

- Part of American Civil War
Date	February 3, 1863
Location	Stewart County, Tennessee
Result	Union victory

Belligerents
United States (Union)	Confederate States of America

Commanders and leaders
(United States) Abner C. Harding	(Confederate States of America) Joseph Wheeler

Units involved
83rd Illinois Infantry; 5th Iowa Cavalry	Second Corps, Army of Tennessee

Strength
800	2,500

Casualties and losses
126	670

The Battle of Dover, also known as the Second Battle of Fort Donelson, was a battle of the American Civil War, occurring on February 3, 1863, in Stewart County, Tennessee.

== Background ==
"In late January 1863, Confederate Major General Joseph Wheeler, commanding two brigades of cavalry, took position on the Cumberland River at Palmyra to disrupt Union shipping. The Federals, however, apprised of Wheeler's intent, refrained from sending any boats up or downriver. Unable to disrupt Union shipping and realizing that he and his men could not remain in the area indefinitely, Wheeler decided to attack the garrison at Dover, Tennessee, which informers reported was small and could easily be overwhelmed."

== Battle ==
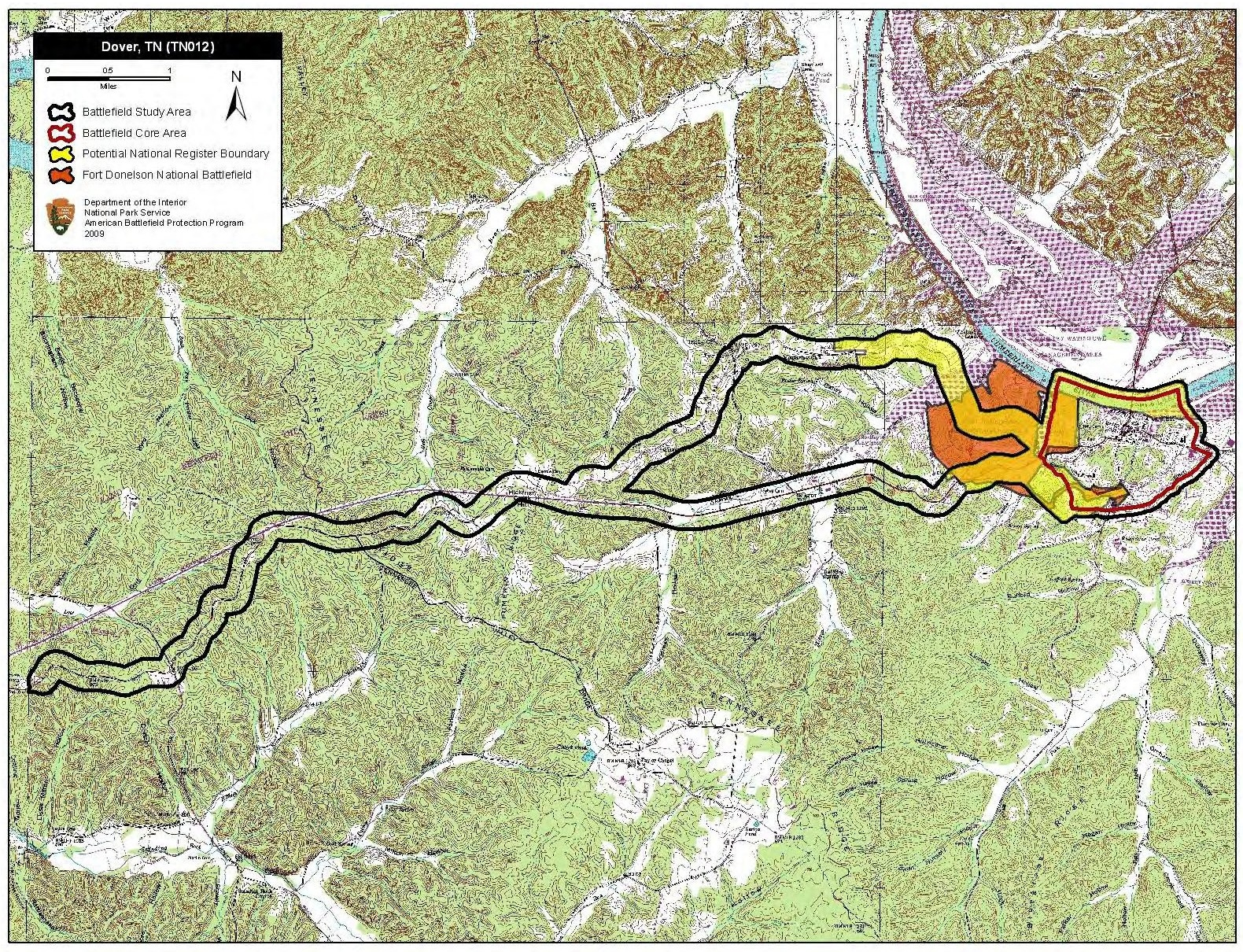
Map of Dover Battlefield core and study areas by the American Battlefield Protection Program

"The Confederates set out for Dover and began an attack between 1 and 2 p.m., on February 3. The 800-man garrison, under the command of Colonel Abner C. Harding, was in and about the town of Dover where they had chosen camps that commanded the area and had dug rifle pits and battery emplacements. The Confederates mounted a determined attack using artillery fire with great skill, but were repulsed with heavy losses. By dusk, both sides were mostly without ammunition. The Confederates surveyed the Union defenses and decided that the enemy was too well placed to allow capture."

== Aftermath ==
"Wheeler's force retired. The Federals sent out a pursuit but to no avail. The Confederates had failed to disrupt shipping on the Cumberland River and capture the garrison at Dover. This Confederate failure left the Union in control in Middle Tennessee and a bitter Brigadier General Nathan Bedford Forrest denounced Wheeler, a favorite of General Braxton Bragg, saying he would not serve under him again."
