= William Warren Lowe =

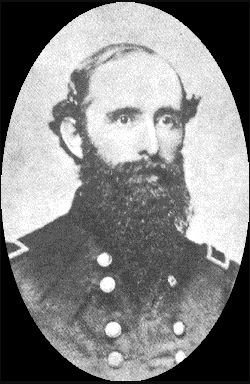
- William Warren Lowe
- Born: 12 October 1831; Greencastle, Indiana
- Died: 18 May 1898 (aged 66); Omaha, Nebraska
- Burial place: Prospect Hill Cemetery, Omaha
- Military career
- Allegiance: United States
- Branch: United States Army
- Service years: 1853–1869
- Rank: Colonel; Brevet Brigadier General
- Commands: 5th Iowa Cavalry Regiment
- Conflicts: American Civil War; First Battle of Bull Run (1861); Siege of Corinth (1862); Battle of Riggins Hill (1862); Tullahoma campaign (1863); Wheeler's October 1863 Raid; Atlanta campaign (1864); Franklin–Nashville Campaign (1864)

William Warren Lowe (12 October 1831 - 18 May 1898) led a volunteer regiment of cavalry from Iowa in the Union Army during the American Civil War. He graduated from the United States Military Academy in 1853. He served as a cavalry officer on the frontier in Texas in 1855–1861. When the Civil War broke out, Lowe fought at First Bull Run. He organized the 5th Iowa Cavalry Regiment and led it at Corinth, at Riggins Hill, the Tullahoma campaign, in Wheeler's October 1863 Raid, the Atlanta campaign, and the Franklin–Nashville Campaign. On several occasions he temporarily led a cavalry brigade and was brevetted brigadier general for war service. He resigned from the army in 1869 and took up civilian pursuits.

== See also ==
- List of American Civil War brevet generals (Union)
