= Monticello Artillery =

Monticello Artillery Battery
- Active: 1862–1865
- Disbanded: May 10, 1865
- Country: Confederate States of America
- Allegiance: Arkansas
- Branch: Confederate States Army
- Type: Battery
- Role: Artillery
- Nickname: Drew Light Artillery
- Engagements: American Civil War: Meridian Campaign; Battle of Yazoo City; Battle of Spanish Fort

Commanders
- 1862-1864: Captain James A. Owens
- 1864-1865: Lieutenant William C. Howell

The Monticello Artillery (1862–1865) was a Confederate Army artillery battery during the American Civil War. The unit was also known as: Owen's Battery, or Howell's Battery. Some post war records refer to the unit as the Drew Light Artillery because most original members were from Drew County, Arkansas.

== Organization ==
Based on the earliest dates of enlistment, the battery was apparently "organized at Monticello, Drew County, Arkansas, on February 8, 1862." The battery is occasionally referred to as either the Drew Light Artillery or "Drew's Battery", based on the units association with Drew County, Arkansas, but these references only appear in post war pension records and other articles.

Captain James A. Owens served as commander of the battery from February 8, 1862, until his resignation on October 11, 1864, at which time Senior First Lieutenant William C. Howell assumed command. A total of 188 men served with the Monticello Artillery during the war. The vast majority of the men were from Drew County, with smaller numbers from the neighboring counties of Ashley, Bradley and Desha. In the summer of 1863, a small number of Mississippians from Chickasaw, Lowndes and Monroe counties were recruited by the Monticello Artillery.

The battery was reorganized for the war on May 15, 1862. In the first quarter of 1864, the battery was armed with five 6 pdr bronze smoothbores and one 3.3" rifle. In May 1864, armed with two 6 pdr smoothbores, one 3.3" rifle and one 12 pdr howitzer.

== Service ==
The battery served east of the Mississippi River for most of the war. The Monticello Artillery was originally organized as a light artillery battery, but as of March 18, 1862, the unit was at Memphis, Tennessee, without guns or equipment, but by May 1862 it was referred to as heavy artillery. In early April 1862 the battery was at Fort Pillow, above Memphis, and later that month the battery moved to Corinth, Mississippi. An order dated Office Chief of Artillery, Corinth, Mississippi, May 2, 1862, directed Captain Owens, commanding Heavy Artillery, to "report with your company to Major-General Hardee for duty with the siege guns of his command." The unit left Corinth a month later and moved to Okolona, Mississippi. By June 30, 1862, the unit was at Columbus, Mississippi On August 29, 1862, the unit is mentioned as part of the Heavy Artillery at Columbus. Altogether the unit would spend almost a year assigned to Columbus.

The unit had apparently reverted to light artillery by January 1, 1863, when General Daniel Ruggles reported:.

Capt Owens' company of light artillery is stationed 1 1\2 miles north of Columbus, on the military road. They have five 6-pounder guns (bronze), limbers and caissons for same; one battery forge and limber, 500 solid shot, fixed; 400 spherical-case, fixed; 80 canister, fixed (all for 6-pounders); [100] 3.3-inch [Rear] shot, [100] 3.3-inch rifle shell, 240 bank cartridges; equipments nearly complete; all in good condition. They also have 100 horses, 16 mules, and 3 baggage wagons. The [men] are all in good condition, well clothed, &c.

By June 30, 1863, the battery had moved back to Okolona, Mississippi. On November 20, 1863, the battery was assigned to Brigadier General Samuel W. Ferguson's cavalry brigade of General Joseph E. Johnston's Department of Mississippi and East Louisiana.

On January 1, 1864, the battery is included in a list of light batteries assigned to the Army of the West, commanded by General Leonidas Polk and is listed as being armed with five 6 lb bronze guns and one 3.3 inch bronze gun. The unit was assigned to Furguson's Brigade of General Nathan Bedford Forrest's Division. The unit is mentioned in Ed Bearss three volume set of the Vicksburg campaign. It appears to have been part of the Confederate forces opposing Sherman's Meridan Campaign in early 1864 and it is mentioned in Margie Bearss' book "Sherman's Forgotten Campaign". The unit was criticized by Major General Polk in February 1864 during the Meridian Campaign for failing to properly care for its horses, resulting in the need for replacements.

In the spring of 1864 the battery was assigned to a cavalry brigade commanded by Confederate General Wirt Adams which was operating in the Big Black and Yazoo Country of Mississippi. While assigned to Adam's Brigade, along with another Arkansas unit, the famed, 11th / 17th Arkansas Mounted Infantry, the battery participated in the capture of the gun boat USS Petrel on April 23, 1864. Major B.P. Jett of the 11th / 17th Arkansas described the battery's part in this action (Jett mistakenly refers to the unit as Drew's Battery):

On April 23rd, a scout came to General Adams and reported a fleet of five gunboats coming up the Yazoo River from Vicksburg. General Adams at once moved his Brigade to Yazoo City, but saw nothing of the gunboats. This was about 11 o'clock; about 2:00 p.m. they came in sight. Drew's battery of six guns was at once stationed on the hill overlooking the river, and gallantly opened on the fleet as it came up the river and tried to pass our guns. The boats replied, and the firing was lively for a time between the boats and our guns. The firing of Drew's guns was rapid and accurate, and he succeeded in driving four of the five boats back down the river, but the flag boat succeeded in passing and continued up the river some two miles and tied up on the opposite bank.

The next day, the boat was still there. Colonel Griffith sent B.B. Chism and Sim Morris, of his Regiment, on a scouting trip to locate the boat and report to him. They did so. As soon as Griffith received the report he sent word to General Adams, and proposed to him to take his Brigade and capture it - said it was feasible and practical. To this, General Adams would not consent. Griffith, worried and discouraged by the General's decision, finally asked the General to give him his (Griffith's) own Regiment and two pieces, and he would capture it; to this, General Adams agreed, saying, as the Colonel was joyously leaving: "Let me know, Colonel when you get it." Soon, Colonel Griffith had his regiment of about 130 men and two pieces of artillery, Drew's Battery, commanded by Lieut. Howel, mounted and moving.

Leading them through the valleys of the Petite Gulf hills out of sight of the spy glasses of the boats, still down the river, until he reached the Yazoo River bottom where the timber was very heavy and thick and some half miles from where the Petrel lay, he halted and put Major Jett in command of some 30 or 40 picked men, mostly from the Hempstead County company, with orders to dismount, leave their horses with the Regiment, and to advance silently and cautiously, and post them behind trees on the bank opposite the gunboat. Sim Morris guided Jett's detachment in, and B.B. Chism remained to guide Col. Griffith and the artillery.

Jett succeeded in getting stationed, un-noticed by the enemy, as directed. His orders were, as soon as he heard Col. Griffith, who was to advance mounted, give the command to halt, he was to open fire on the boat which was done. The boat replied gallantly with the two guns directed at us, but the shots went over the heads of the members of Jett's squad; however, some of Griffith's men who were coming up at "double quick" were killed or wounded. The artillery was pulled by hand from where the Regiment halted and dismounted, some two hundred yards away. As soon as she was fired on, the Petrel cut loose from the bank and started up the river, but our orders were to fire into the port holes so as to prevent reloading - no breach loaders in those days - and the cannon had to be swabbed after each shot. Our men followed her, firing as directed, and in the meantime, Lieutenant Howel, with his two guns, was pumping shells into her insides, and after a few shots a steam pipe was struck. She ran into the bank, her crew escaping to the opposite shore, but the Captain remained, standing in the water with his white flag.

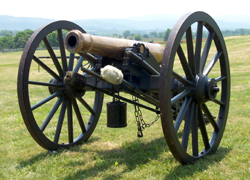
1841 Model Gun, Fires 6 lb. projectiles, Workhorse of Mexican War, but considered obsolete by Civil War, Weight: 1,784 pounds, Range: up to 1,523 yards

On May 15, 1864, Brigadier General Wirt Adams reported that two of Owen's guns were disabled and two more were "worthless". The unit is reported as being assigned to Adam's Division of the Department of Alabama, Mississippi and East Louisiana on June 1, 1864. Based on the unit's forage (feed) requisitions, the unit was stationed at Selma, Alabama, during June 1864, and while at Selma, on June 14, 1864, the Captain Owens signed for equipment including:

Received ordnance and ordnance stores at Selma June 14, 1864 from post comdt Col Rosser:

3-6 pdr bronze guns
3-6 pdr iron guns
1-3 3/10 [3/16?] rifle-iron
1-12 pdr howitzer-iron
8-6 pdr carriages & limbers

Then unit seems to have settled in at Spanish Fort (Mobile), Alabama, as siege artillery by the summer of 1864. and remained there until the end of the war. The unit was initially assigned to Brigadier General St. John R. Lindell's Brigade of Major General Dabney H. Maury's District of the Gulf. By November 1, 1864, the battery was under the command of Captain William C. Howell. Eventually the battery was placed in an organization commanded by Colonel Isaac W. Patton and assigned to Redoubt No. 2, (also known as "Fort McDermont") of a line of Confederate works as Spanish Fort where they, along with the 22nd Louisiana and Massenburg's Georgia Light Artillery manned a Brooke Rifle, six smoothbore rifles, two twenty-four pound howitzers and six mortars. The unit participated in the Battle of Spanish Fort, part of the Mobile Campaign, in April 1865. Union forces embarked on a land campaign in early 1865 to take Mobile from the east. Maj. Gen. E.R.S. Canby's XIII and XVI corps moved along the eastern shore of Mobile Bay forcing the Confederates back into their defenses. Union forces concentrated first on Spanish Fort, five miles to the north. On March 27, 1865, Canby's forces undertook a siege of Spanish Fort, which consisted of a semi-circular line of five redoubts stretching almost two miles long. The Union had enveloped the fort by April 1, and on April 8 captured it. Most of the Confederate forces, including the remnants of the Monticello Artillery escaped and fled to Mobile.

The fall of Fort Blakeley on April 9, 1865, signaled to Confederate General Dabney H. Maury in Mobile that it was time to begin evacuation of the remaining Confederate troops in the city. On April 12, 1865, Mobile was declared an open city and the remaining Confederate garrison retreated with the intention of joining the remains of the Army of Tennessee, then in North Carolina. The surrender of the Army of Tennessee to General Sherman on April 26, 1865, prevented that option and surrender of the Mobile garrison soon followed. This small force out of Mobile, including the remnants of the Monticello Artillery, was the last Confederate army to surrender east of the Mississippi River.

== Surrender ==
Stewart Sikakis claims that the unit re-crossed the Mississippi River in 1865 and surrendered in the Department of the Trans-Mississippi on May 26, 1865, although this appears to be an error. There are reports and correspondence in the Official Records of the American Civil War which place Owens' Arkansas Battery at Spanish Fort (Mobile), Alabama, until just before the end of the war. The battery was among the last Confederate troops east of the Mississippi River to surrender on May 10, 1865, at Meridian, Mississippi. The Compiled Service Records of the unit members confirm that most of the men were paroled at Meridian, Mississippi, on May 10, 1865. Affidavits submitted by many former unit members in their post war pension applications confirm that the paroles took place at Meridian.

== See also ==
- List of Confederate units from Arkansas
- Confederate Units by State
