= Clark's Missouri Battery =

Artillery battery of the Confederate States Army

Clark's Missouri Battery 2nd Missouri Light Battery King's Battery Farris' Battery
- Active: October 23, 1861 to May 1865
- Country: Confederate States of America
- Allegiance: Confederate government of Missouri (October 23, 1861 - January 16, 1862); Confederate States of America (January 16, 1862 to May 1865)
- Branch: Missouri State Guard; Confederate States Army
- Type: Artillery
- Equipment: 2 × M1841 6-pounder field guns 2 × 12-pounder howizters
- Engagements: American Civil War: Battle of Wilson's Creek; First Battle of Lexington; Battle of Dunagin's Farm; Battle of Pea Ridge; Battle of Iuka; Battle of Corinth; Vicksburg Campaign; Battle of Yazoo City; Battle of Thompson's Station; Battle of Meridian; Atlanta campaign; Battle of Nashville

Clark's Missouri Battery (also known as the 2nd Missouri Light Battery and later known as King's Battery and then the Farris' Battery) was an artillery battery that served in the Confederate States Army during the American Civil War.

== Early history ==
=== Missouri State Guard ===
The battery was first formed as a unit of the Missouri State Guard in late 1861. In Lexington, Missouri, Samuel Churchill Clark enrolled into the State Guard as a private and was appointed to the 8th Division of the MSG under James S. Rains. Soon, the State Guard artilleryman was leading an iron 6-pounder gun with a dedicated crew. The artillery battery served in the Trans-Mississippi Theater where it had provided artillery support for Gen. Sterling Price's army at the battles of Wilson's Creek and Lexington.

==== First Battle of Lexington ====
Amid the First Battle of Lexington on September 18, 1861, Clark commanded three six-pound artillery pieces and their cannoneers. Clark's Battery, along with Bledsoe's Missouri Battery and Guibor's Battery kept the position of Colonel James A. Mulligan's Union forces under artillery fire.

== Clark's Battery ==
On October 23, 1861, Samuel C. Clark was officially appointed captain of the 1st Battery of Artillery in the 4th Division of the Missouri State Guard under Gen. William Y. Slack.

=== Confederate States Army ===
In Springfield, Missouri, Gen. Price reorganized the battery for Confederate service as the 2nd Missouri Light Artillery Battery on January 16, 1862. Captain Clark's battery was assigned to the First Missouri Confederate Brigade commanded by Col. Henry Little under Price's division. Clark's battery and Wade's Missouri Battery accompanied Col. Little and his brigade as the army's rearguard. Armed with four field pieces in total, the battery fielded two 6-pounder field guns and two 12-pounder howizters.

==== Battle of Dunagin's Farm ====
Fighting in Arkansas's first Civil War engagement, Clark's Missouri Battery took part in the Battle of Dunagin's Farm, south of Little Sugar Creek. Gen. Sterling Price assigned the artillery battery to Col. Louis Hébert's infantry brigade in Gen. Benjamin McCulloch's division, which was acting as the rearguard for his army retreating from Springfield, Missouri. On February 17, 1862, near Flat Creek, the artillerymen of Clark's 2nd Missouri Light Battery along with Col. Elijah Gates' 1st Missouri Cavalry encountered the 1st Missouri Cavalry Regiment of Col. Calvin A. Ellis under Brig. Gen. Samuel R. Curtis. The artillery battery opened the engagement with a bombardment down Telegraph Road, leading to a skirmish between the Missouri cannoneers and the 3rd Iowa Independent Battery Light Artillery. Col. Hébert would shortly withdraw south to Cross Hollow with the rest of Price's Confederate army.

==== Battle of Pea Ridge ====
On March 2, 1862, Gen. Price combined his forces with those of Gen. McCulloch and Maj. Gen. Earl Van Dorn to form Van Dorn's Army of the West. Van Dorn's Confederate forces moved towards the Union Army of the Southwest at Pea Ridge, Arkansas. Engaging in the Battle of Pea Ridge from March 7 to March 8, Samuel Clark led the 2nd Battery of Artillery with Lt. James L. Farris and four 6-pounder guns. On the first day at Pea Ridge, the 2nd Missouri Light battery, along with Wade's Missouri Battery, Guibor's Battery, and the 3rd Missouri Light Battery participated in an artillery duel with the 3rd Iowa Independent Battery Light Artillery. The batteries formed a wall of artillery fire on the Dubuque Battery for the First Missouri Brigade. On the next day, Cpt. Clark was among the State Guard and Confederate forces killed in action. Amid the end of the battle, Union troops then pressed a counterattack, forcing Clark's battery, as well as the rest of Price's division, to retreat. The captain was fatally struck by a Union cannonball while preparing to limber his last piece of artillery under orders to retire.

== King's Battery ==
After Cpt. Clark's death at Elkhorn Tavern, Captains William Clark Kennerly, Houston King, and James L. Farris commanded the battery. On March 17, 1862, the 1st Division of Gen. Price's Army of the West was reorganized, temporarily assigning Clark's battery to the Third Missouri Brigade under Brig. Gen. Alexander E. Steen.

The battery, in April 1862, accompanied the Army of the West across the Mississippi River to Memphis, Tennessee. While in Memphis, First Lieutenant Houston King was elected captain on April 26, 1862, and the battery was afterwards known as "King's Battery". In May, the Army of the West was transferred to Corinth, Mississippi on the state line with Tennessee where the battery mostly served on outpost duty. With Cpt. Houston King assuming command of the battery, he led it through the various campaigns in areas east of the river, including Corinth and Iuka. King's battery engaged with Union forces at the Battle of Iuka on September 19, 1862.

=== Battle of Corinth ===
On September 28, Van Dorn's Army of West Tennessee was formed from elements of the Army of the West including the light artillery battery. The battery participated with the cavalry in the Battle of Corinth with minimal engagement, and subsequently aided in covering the Confederate retreat in October 1862. Following their defeat in Corinth, the men evaded capture by a detachment of Ulysses S. Grant's Army of the Tennessee at the Battle of Hatchie's Bridge.

Van Dorn's Army of West Tennessee and Price's Corps were merged on December 9, 1862, forming the Department of Mississippi and East Louisiana, known as the Army of Mississippi under the leadership of Lt. Gen. John C. Pemberton. Following its initial service in the Army of the West, Jackson's cavalry division was assigned to Maj. Gen. Earl Van Dorn's cavalry corps. Ordered to report to Gen. Van Dorn at Okolona, Mississippi, the battery received two 12-pounder howitzers and two captured 3-inch ordnance rifles. With eight horses drawing each field carriage, the mounted cannoneers were trained to move in coordination with the cavalry.

=== Battle of Thompson's Station ===
After being reassigned to the Army of Tennessee, the battery began frequently fighting in Middle Tennessee between Franklin and Columbia. King's battery engaged in combat at the Battle of Thompson's Station close to Spring Hill in March 1863. By March 5, Cpt. King had positioned four field guns as a defensive line facing the depot, south of Thompson's Station. The battery repulsed two charges of the Union Army. Under enemy fire, the Confederate artillery, bolstered by Van Dorn's main force, forced Col. John Coburn's infantry brigade to retreat, resulting in a Confederate victory.

Two days after the murder of Van Dorn on May 7, 1863, the Missouri battery was assigned to the brigade of newly promoted Brig. Gen. John W. Whitfield under the cavalry corps of Lt. Gen. Nathan Bedford Forrest. Whitfield's brigade was one of three within Brig. Gen. William Hicks Jackson's cavalry division under Gen. Joseph E. Johnston, the commander of the Army of Relief.

=== Vicksburg Campaign ===
Ordered by the Department of Tennessee on May 26, 1863, Jackson's cavalry division with Whitfield's brigade including King's battery were sent to Northern Mississippi. They were ordered to support Gen. Joseph E. Johnston near Jackson, Mississippi, as he attempted to relieve John C. Pemberton during the Vicksburg Campaign by Maj. Gen. Ulysses S. Grant. Upon arriving, Gen. "Red" Jackson's cavalry division established headquarters near Canton, Mississippi, on June 4, 1863, and the battery mustered 89 artillerymen. They were stationed in Vernon, from June 13 to 23, 1863. After Pemberton's surrender on July 4, 1863, Johnston's Confederate forces fell back toward Jackson and engaged the enemy until leaving for Enterprise on the 16th of the month.

Following a reorganization on November 23, 1863, one section of Clark's Missouri Battery under Lt. Farris was assigned to Brig. Gen. George B. Cosby's brigade of Jackson's Division in Gen. Stephen D. Lee Cavalry Corps under Lt. Gen. Polk. By February 1864, Cosby's brigade was reassigned to the Department of East Tennessee and West Virginia, but the battery remained in the Army of Mississippi.

=== Battle of Yazoo City ===
The section rejoined Clark's Missouri Battery, led by Cpt. Houston King, who remained with the Texas Cavalry Brigade once commanded by Whitfield and now under Brig. Gen. Sul Ross. The brigade was composed of the 3rd Texas, 6th Texas, 9th Texas, 27th Texas Cavalry regiments, and the 2nd Missouri Light Artillery Battery. Together with Brig. Gen. Robert V. Richardson's brigade, they battled Union forces along the Yazoo River in February and fought in the Battle of Yazoo City on March 5, 1864. After intense combat between Col. James Henry Coates' forces and the Texas and Tennessee Brigades, the Confederates defeated Col. Coates.

=== Atlanta Campaign ===
During the Atlanta campaign, the horse artillery battery, supported "Sul" Ross and other cavalry brigades under Brig. Gen. William H. Jackson's cavalry division assigned to Lt. Gen. Leonidas Polk's Army of Mississippi. Engaging in skirmishes throughout the summer of 1864, they faced the Union cavalry of Hugh Judson Kilpatrick in August, which was targeting Macon and Western Railroad.

==== Battle of Meridan ====
After its involvement in the Atlanta Campaign, the unit was dismounted and transferred to Meridian, Mississippi to oppose Union Maj. Gen. William Tecumseh Sherman's Meridian campaign in May 1864. During Sherman's march to the city of Meridian, Cpt. King operated on Sherman's flank and rear until retreating on May 17, 1864, when the Army of Mississippi reunited with the Army of Tennessee near Adairsville, Georgia.

On June 10, 1864, an artillery battalion composed of the Missouri battery, Croft's Georgia Battery and Waties' South Carolina Battery served in the Cavalry division of the Third Corps, Army of Tennessee, formerly known as the Army of Mississippi under Lt. Gen. Polk. Following Polk's death on June 14, 1864, the leadership was transferred multiple times. William Loring first assumed temporary command of the Third Corps then Alexander P. Stewart. Jackson's cavalry division was soon reassigned under Gen. Joseph E. Johnston's Army of Tennessee by June 30, 1864. On July 10, the battery formed one section of Waties' Artillery Battalion with Croft's and Waties' batteries under the Third Corps of Stewart. Gen. Johnston was replaced by John B. Hood on July 9, 1864.

On July 31, 1864, King's Missouri battery was placed under command of Col. Robert Franklin Beckham's horse artillery in Jackson's Cavalry Division of Maj. Gen. Wheeler's Cavalry Corps in Gen. Hood's Army of Tennessee, where it remained until the end of August.

By September, they accompanied Hood's Army of Tennessee, launching the Franklin–Nashville campaign back into central Tennessee. Hood ordered the corps of Lt. Gen. Nathan Bedford Forrest to replace the cavalry corps of Joseph Wheeler. After Forrest united with the Confederate Army of Tennessee on November 18, 1864, William H. Jackson's cavalry division was integrated into Forrest's Cavalry Corps along with the horse artillery battalion.

== Farris' Battery ==
In November 1864, following Cpt. Houston King's promotion to colonel and his move west, Lt. James L. Farris was elevated to captain, and the newly equipped battery was renamed the "Farris' Battery, Missouri Light Artillery".

=== Battle of Spring Hill ===
On November 29, 1864, the Farris Battery of Jackson's division accompanied the Forrest's Cavalry Corps at the Battle of Spring Hill. The officers of the battery provided artillery support to initiate the retreat of Maj. Gen. John Schofield's Army of the Ohio to Nashville.

Despite the cavalry forces serving as the advance guard during the march to Franklin, artillery support was absent in the subsequent Battle of Franklin by order of Gen. Hood. The battery did not participate in the Franklin engagement.

=== Battle of Nashville ===
Meanwhile, Schofield combined his Ohio forces with Maj. Gen. George H. Thomas in Nashville. In the early days of December, the Army of Tennessee assumed a position facing the city. At the Battle of Nashville on December 15–16, 1864, Maj. Gen. Forrest's cavalry joined the Army of Tennessee, led by Lt. Gen. Hood, in combat against Maj. Gen. George H. Thomas's Union Army of the Cumberland.

In the days following after the Confederate defeat in Nashville, Forrest commanded the rearguard composed of his cavalry corps and a few infantry brigades in skirmishes against the Union Army. The remaining elements of Hood's army eventually managed to escape across the Tennessee River and regroup in Northern Mississippi.

Toward the war's conclusion, along with the Confederate troops in the Department of Alabama and East Mississippi, the Farris' battery surrendered at Citronelle, Alabama on May 4, 1865.

== See also ==
- List of Missouri Confederate Civil War units
