= Yazoo City expedition =

- Part of the American Civil War
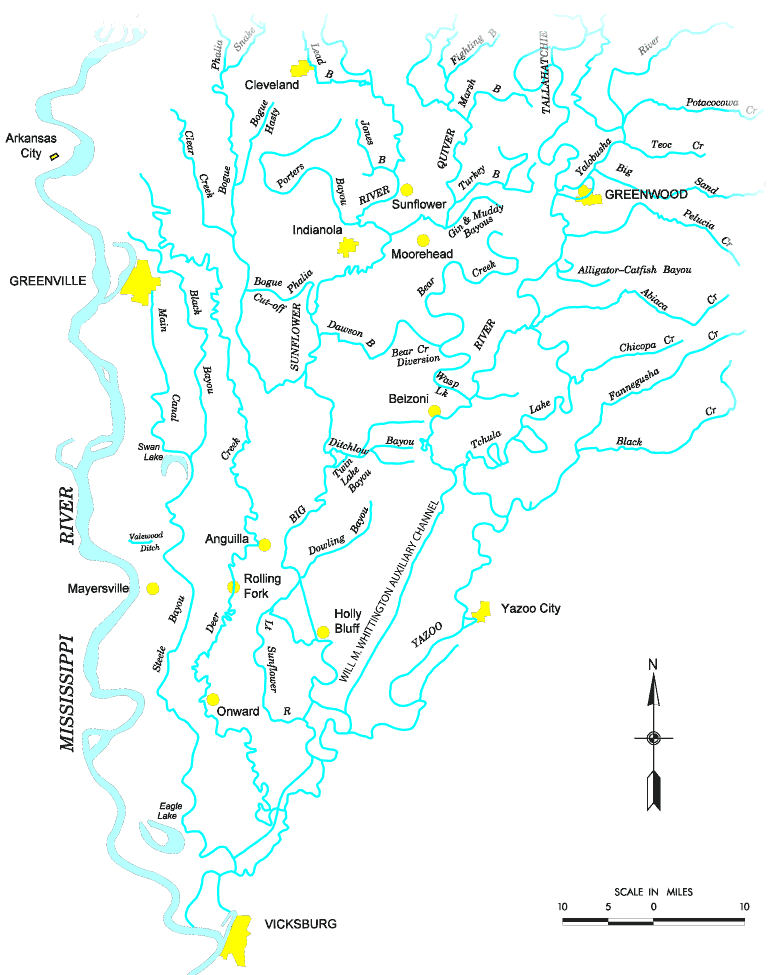
- Yazoo River
Date	May 4–21, 1864
Location	Yazoo County, Mississippi
Result	Union victory

Belligerents
United States (Union)	(Confederate States of America) CSA (Confederacy)

Commanders and leaders
John McArthur	Wirt Adams

Units involved
Post of Vicksburg	Adams' Cavalry Brigade

Strength
2 brigades of infantry	brigade

Casualties and losses
5 killed 14 wounded	unknown

The Yazoo City expedition was an expedition of Union forces from the Vicksburg garrison under General John McArthur against Confederate forces in central Mississippi under General Wirt Adams.

== History ==
McArthur's expedition was in conjunction with a second Union raid under Samuel D. Sturgis in northern Mississippi. McArthur’s primary objective was to divert Confederate forces away from Sturgis’ front. Initially, Confederate department commander Stephen D. Lee showed little concern over these two raids concluding it was merely an attempt to divert attention. However, McArthur’s expedition steadily drove Adams’ Confederates from their positions, skirmishing at Benton, Luce’s Plantation and Vaughn’s Station along the Mississippi Central Railroad. Upon seeing the concentration of Confederate forces to his front, McArthur concluded his objective had been met, along with destruction of the Mississippi Central Railroad. McArthur ordered Alfred W. Ellet and the Mississippi Marine Brigade to remain in Yazoo City while he returned to Vicksburg with the remainder of his force. Despite meeting his objectives, McArthur’s expedition was unable to prevent the defeat of Sturgis at the Battle of Brices Cross Roads. McArthur was still content with the showing of strength and proof Union forces could move into the interior of Mississippi when desired.

== Opposing forces ==
=== Union ===
Post of Vicksburg: Brigadier General John McArthur

- 1st Brigade (2nd Brigade, 4th Division, Dist. of Vicksburg): Col Benjamin Dornblaser
  - 46th Illinois Infantry
  - 76th Illinois Infantry
- 2nd Brigade (2nd Brigade, 1st Division, XVII Corps): Col James Henry Coates
  - 11th Illinois Infantry
  - 72nd Illinois Infantry
  - 124th Illinois Infantry
- Artillery: Captain Bolton, Chief of Artillery
  - Battery L, 2nd Illinois Light Artillery
  - 7th Ohio Battery
- Cavalry: Col Embury D. Osband
  - 1st Kansas Mounted Infantry
  - 5th Illinois Cavalry, detachment
  - 11th Illinois Cavalry, detachment
  - 3rd U.S. Colored Cavalry

=== Confederate ===
Department of Alabama, Mississippi & East Louisiana: Lieutenant General Stephen D. Lee

- Wirt's Cavalry Brigade: Brigadier General W. Wirt Adams

== Battles ==
- Benton (May 7–9, 1864)
- Luce's Plantation (May 13, 1864)
- Vaughn Station (May 15, 1864)
