= Anderson Boyd (politician) =

American politician (1835–?)

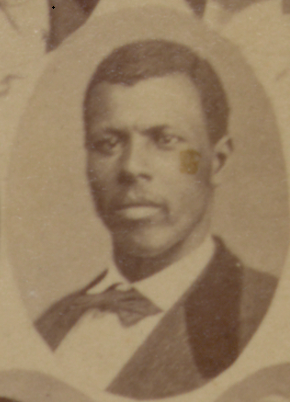

Anderson Boyd (February 1835 - ?) was an American politician.

Boyd was born in South Carolina. In November 1863, he enlisted in the 3rd United States Colored Cavalry Regiment.

He represented Oktibbeha County in the Mississippi House of Representatives from 1874 to 1875.

== See also ==
- African American officeholders from the end of the Civil War until before 1900
