= Battle of Yazoo City =

1864 battle of the American Civil War

Coordinates: 32°51′23″N 90°24′27″W

- Part of the American Civil War
Date	March 5, 1864
Location	Yazoo City, Mississippi
Result	Inconclusive

Belligerents
United States (Union)	Confederate States

Commanders and leaders
(United States) James H. Coates	(Confederate States of America) Lawrence S. Ross

Strength
1,200; 5 gunboats	1,300; 6 guns

Casualties and losses
183	64
- Location of Yazoo City in Mississippi

The Battle of Yazoo City (March 5, 1864) was an engagement in Mississippi during a month-long Union expedition up the Yazoo River in the American Civil War. The Union force commanded by Colonel James H. Coates repulsed an attack led by Confederate Brigadier General Lawrence S. Ross. The Union force suffered greater losses and withdrew down the river the next day with a large amount of cotton seized or bought from plantations along the river. The expedition was undertaken in cooperation with Major General William Tecumseh Sherman's Meridian campaign.

== Background ==
In early 1864, President Abraham Lincoln wanted General Sherman to cooperate with the projected Red River Campaign under Major General Nathaniel P. Banks, but the river was too low for naval support until March. Therefore, Sherman undertook the Meridian campaign to destroy the Confederate railroads in central Mississippi. Sherman's main column of 25,000 troops left Vicksburg, Mississippi on February 3, 1864, headed for Meridian. Sherman directed William Sooy Smith to strike south from Memphis, Tennessee with 7,000 Union cavalry and meet him at Meridian. A second cooperating force was led by Colonel Coates.

== Expedition ==
Following orders from 17th Army Corps and additional instructions from General Sherman, Colonel Coates put his 947 soldiers aboard river transports at Vicksburg on January 31, 1864. The expedition included 21 officers and 539 enlisted men from the 11th Illinois Infantry Regiment under Major George C. McKee and 17 officers and 370 men from the 8th Louisiana Infantry Regiment (African Descent) under Lieutenant Colonel F. E. Peebles. Coates was appointed captain in the 11th Illinois Infantry on July 30, 1861 and rose through the ranks to become the regiment's commanding officer on July 8, 1863. The 11th Illinois was a veteran unit that fought at Fort Donelson, Shiloh, and Vicksburg. The 8th Mississippi Infantry (AD) had previously been employed to dig trenches and other fatigue duties. The unit had never been in action and the soldiers were glad to take part in the expedition.

The transports, escorted by five gunboats under Captain Elias K. Owen, reached the mouth of the Yazoo River that evening and took on enough fuel to last two weeks. The flotilla turned into the Yazoo River and reached Haynes Bluff on the evening of February 1 where it picked up a recruiting detachment of 11 officers and 25 men from the 1st Mississippi Cavalry Regiment (African Descent) under Major Jeremiah B. Cook. The next day, the expedition advanced 25 mi (40 km) up the river to Satartia where five companies of the 11th Illinois and the cavalry went ashore and chased some Confederates out of the village.

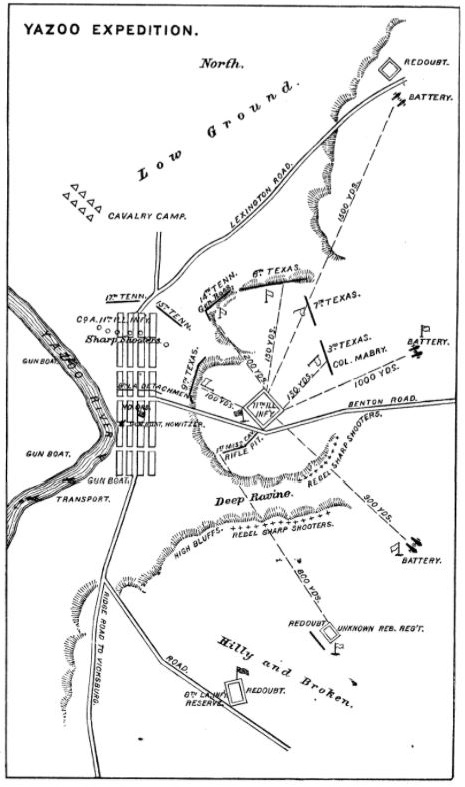
Map of the Yazoo Expedition.

On February 3 at 10:00 am, the flotilla reached Liverpool Heights and was fired on reportedly by two 12-pounder Napoleons. Faced by this opposition, Coates landed half of the 11th Illinois and half of the 8th Louisiana (AD). These troops became embroiled in a skirmish with fewer than 500 dismounted men from Ross's Texas cavalry brigade. Having trouble maneuvering in the hilly terrain, Coates landed the remainder of his force. After failing to make headway, Coates re-embarked his infantry that evening and moved downstream 1 mi (1.6 km). The Union troops sustained losses of six killed, 21 wounded, and eight missing. On February 4, the flotilla came upstream again and found that Ross' guns were out of ammunition. The transports were subjected to a barrage of small arms fire that wounded five men, but pressed onward. Two gunboats reached Yazoo City, but withdrew downstream when two Confederate guns opened fire and scored two hits on one gunboat. The expedition withdrew downriver to Liverpool Heights. Coates put his wounded men aboard a steamboat and evacuated them to Vicksburg.

On February 9, the flotilla moved upstream again and found Yazoo City unoccupied. Ross' brigade had moved off to the east to help fight against Sherman's main column. On February 10 at Yazoo City, Coates was joined by Colonel Embury D. Osband and five companies of the 1st Mississippi Cavalry (AD) which had marched overland. To find out where Ross had gone, Brigadier General John P. Hawkins marched from Haynes Bluff with the 3rd Arkansas Infantry (AD) and 11th Louisiana Infantry (AD) Regiments. Hawkins' force scouted 50 mi (80 km) east to the Big Black River but found no trace of Ross. Coates and Owen's flotilla continued upstream to Greenwood which it reached on February 14. Coates sent Osband with 250 cavalry toward Grenada on February 16. Osband returned the following day with the information that Nathan Bedford Forrest's headquarters was there. Following orders from Brigadier General John McArthur at Vicksburg, the flotilla left Greenwood on February 19. Seizing large numbers of cotton bales while descending the river, the expedition reached Yazoo City on February 28. As a precaution against surprise, the 1st Mississippi Cavalry disembarked first in order to reconnoiter the area.

By this date, Sherman's main column reached Canton on its return march from Meridian. Ross' brigade returned to the Yazoo City area and a few miles east of town, the 6th Texas and 9th Texas Cavalry Regiments routed a 43-man patrol from the 1st Mississippi Cavalry (AD) and inflicted 18 casualties. Colonel Osband later claimed that five of the men were "brutally murdered". Coates noted on March 2 that skirmishing with Ross' cavalry occurred daily. Coates also reported that Osband had successfully recruited enough men to nearly fill the 1st Mississippi Cavalry Regiment (AD), with each soldier mounted on a horse or mule.

== Battle ==
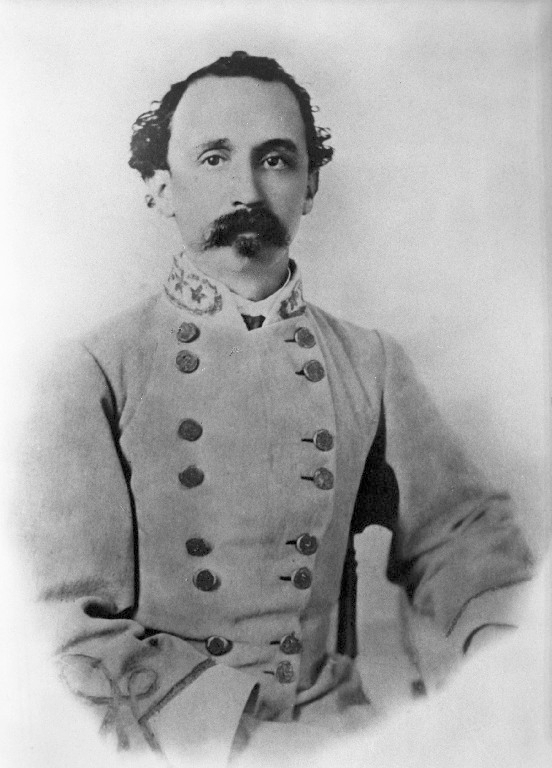
Lawrence S. Ross

On March 4, 1864, Coates learned that Brigadier General Robert V. Richardson's Tennessee cavalry brigade, numbering 550 men, had joined Ross. Richardson outranked Ross, but agreed to cooperate as equals since Ross knew more about the area. Ross reported that their combined force numbered 1,300 men. On March 5, the Confederates attacked and by 10:00 am surrounded the position of the 11th Illinois on the east side of Yazoo City. Six companies of the 8th Louisiana (AD) moved from their position south of town to assist, but they were steadily driven back into Yazoo City where they barricaded the main street with cotton bales. The Confederates fought their way into town and fired on the defenders from houses, but the black soldiers held their ground. Fire from the gunboats helped keep the Confederate soldiers from overrunning Yazoo City. Major McKee sent a small force to contact Coates, who was in Yazoo City. Ten of these soldiers were captured, but three others escaped and reported to Coates that the only artillery piece with the 11th Illinois was disabled.

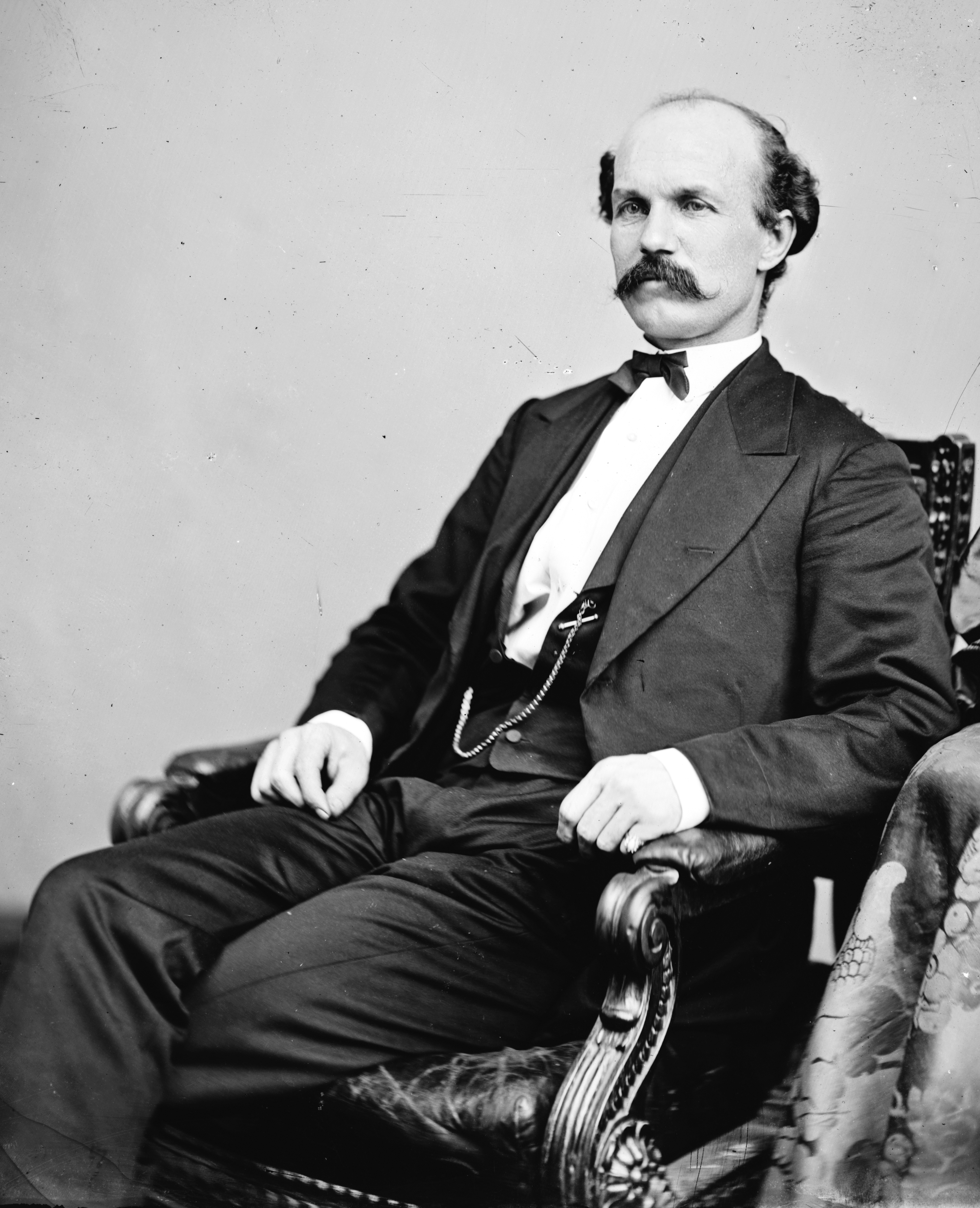
George C. McKee

To defend the town, Coates had six companies of the 8th Louisiana (AD) and Company A of the 11th Illinois. He requested another artillery piece from the gunboats. A boat howitzer was sent ashore, but its gun crew ran away and another steadier crew had to be sent to man the piece. The gun was used to fire on structures where Richardson's Confederates were sheltered. Coates reported that the Confederates had six guns, which inflicted some loss on the 11th Illinois, but were ineffective when firing on targets in the town. Lieutenant Colonel Peebles and the remaining four companies of the 8th Louisiana held their redoubt south of the town. For four hours, nine companies of the 11th Illinois under McKee in a redoubt and 80 men of the 1st Mississippi under Major Cook in rifle pits were isolated east of Yazoo City. Ross demanded that McKee surrender three times.

Lieutenant Rogers of Ross' staff approached McKee's position and demanded an unconditional surrender. Rogers added, "That in case of having to storm the works, General Ross said that he would be unable to restrain his men." McKee protested that it would be murder to kill prisoners and refused to surrender. A second demand for surrender was sent, stating, "You are entirely surrounded and cannot possibly effect a retreat." McKee replied in writing, "I have no idea of surrendering." Ross sent a third demand, "I regret for the sake of humanity that you do not find it consistent with your feelings of duty to your Government to surrender the redoubt, which I can certainly storm and take". To this, McKee did not send a written reply. Ross reported that he refused to guarantee that the African-American soldiers or their white officers would be treated as prisoners of war, and that McKee "squabbled" about that point.

Ross and Richardson decided against attacking McKee's position. The Confederates in the town destroyed some Union supplies and seized some cotton. At about 2:00 pm, Coates ordered an attack which cleared the Confederates from Yazoo City. The Confederate force began withdrawing; this was hastened when McKee led an attack from his redoubt with a handful of men. Ross admitted that the African-American troops defending the town rallied and "pressed our forces so hard" that the Confederates were forced to fall back.

== Aftermath ==
On March 6, 1864, orders arrived from XVII Corps for Coates to load his troops aboard steamboats and travel down the Yazoo River to Liverpool Heights. Coates' landed his force at that location and marched overland to Vicksburg, leaving some troops at Haynes Bluff. There was no Confederate pursuit. Total Union losses for the expedition were 31 killed, 121 wounded, and 31 missing. Of the Union loss of 183 casualties, the 8th Louisiana (AD) lost 144, the 1st Mississippi (AD) lost 13, and the 11th Illinois lost 26. Richardson reported sustaining 64 casualties, including 37 men in his brigade.

Coates reported that 1,728 cotton bales were being shipped to Vicksburg aboard transports as follows: Sioux City 400 bales, J. H. Lacey 192, Des Moines 228, Minnehaha 443, and Emma Boyd 190; the total was 1,521 bales. The gunboats had possession of 207 bales. In addition, the steamers Hastings and Mattie Cook had an unreported number of bales that had been purchased by agents licensed by the United States Treasury. Sherman wrote to Major General Grant that, "The sooner all the cotton in the Southern States is burned or got away the better." He went on to complain about the possibility of greedy cotton speculators bribing army officers and men.

Sherman's main column reached Meridian on February 14 and his troops spent five days wrecking the railroads and other facilities. After waiting fruitlessly for Smith to arrive, Sherman's forces marched to Canton where they remained from February 27 to March 3. Finally, Sherman returned to Vicksburg. Meanwhile, Smith was routed by Forrest in the Battle of Okolona on February 21 and retreated.

== Forces ==
=== Union order of battle ===
Yazoo Expedition: Col. James Henry Coates
Units	Commander	Strength	Losses
11th Illinois Infantry Regiment	Maj. George C. McKee	560	26
8th Louisiana Infantry Regiment (African Descent)	Lt. Col. F. E. Peebles	387	144
1st Mississippi Cavalry Regiment (African Descent)	Col. Embury D. Osband	c.250	13
United States Navy	Capt. Elias K. Owen	5 gunboats	unknown

=== Confederate order of battle ===
Confederate forces: Brig. Gens. Robert V. Richardson and Lawrence Sullivan Ross
Brigade	Strength	Units	Commander
Texas Brigade; Brig. Gen. Lawrence "Sul" Ross	750; 4 guns	Escort: Texas company	Lt. Rush L. Elkin
Texas Brigade; Brig. Gen. Lawrence "Sul" Ross	750; 4 guns	3rd Texas Cavalry Regiment	Col. Hinchie P. Mabry
Texas Brigade; Brig. Gen. Lawrence "Sul" Ross	750; 4 guns	6th Texas Cavalry Regiment	Col. Jack Wharton
Texas Brigade; Brig. Gen. Lawrence "Sul" Ross	750; 4 guns	9th Texas Cavalry Regiment	Col. Dudley W. Jones
Texas Brigade; Brig. Gen. Lawrence "Sul" Ross	750; 4 guns	27th Texas Cavalry Regiment	Col. Edwin R. Hawkins
Texas Brigade; Brig. Gen. Lawrence "Sul" Ross	750; 4 guns	Clark's Missouri Battery	Capt. Houston King
Tennessee Brigade; Brig. Gen. Robert V. Richardson	550; 2 guns	12th Tennessee Cavalry Regiment	Col. James J. Neely
Tennessee Brigade; Brig. Gen. Robert V. Richardson	550; 2 guns	14th Tennessee Cavalry Regiment	Maj. James G. Thurmand †
Tennessee Brigade; Brig. Gen. Robert V. Richardson	550; 2 guns	15th Tennessee Cavalry Regiment	Col. Thomas H. Logwood
Tennessee Brigade; Brig. Gen. Robert V. Richardson	550; 2 guns	Artillery section	Capt. Thrall (WIA)
