= 3rd United States Colored Cavalry Regiment =

3rd United States Colored Cavalry Regiment 1st Mississippi Cavalry (African Descent)
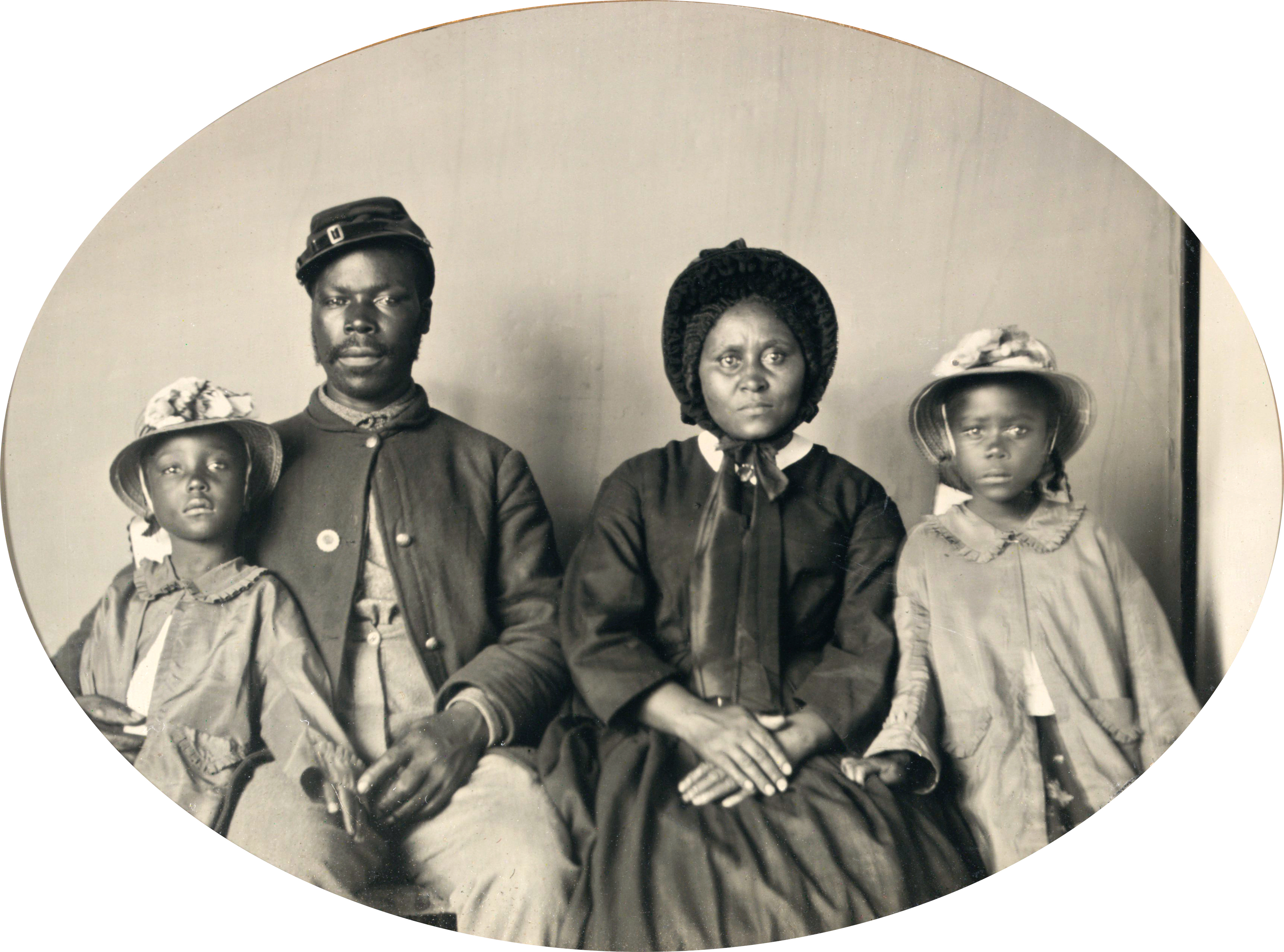
- Sgt. Samuel Smith, African-American soldier with family
- Active: 11 Mar. 1864 – 26 Jan. 1866
- Country: United States
- Allegiance: (United States) Union
- Branch: Union Army
- Type: Cavalry
- Size: Regiment
- Engagements: American Civil War; Action at Bayou Boeuf (1863); Battle of Yazoo City (1864); Action at Roach's Plantation (1864); Yazoo City expedition (1864); Action near Jackson (1864); Action at Vaughan's Station (1864); Battle of Egypt Station (1864)

Commanders
- Notable commanders: Embury D. Osband; Jeremiah B. Cook

The 3rd United States Colored Cavalry was a regiment in the United States Army organized as one of the units of the United States Colored Troops during the American Civil War. The regiment was originally formed in October 1863 at Vicksburg, Mississippi as the 1st Mississippi Cavalry Regiment (African Descent). The unit soon began taking part in expeditions near Vicksburg. In February–March 1864, the regiment saw action at Yazoo City. After being renamed the 3rd U.S. Colored Cavalry in March 1864, the regiment continued to participate in raids, including the Yazoo City expedition in May. In December 1864, the unit took part in a successful raid led by Benjamin Grierson during which the Battle of Egypt Station and other actions were fought. The regiment operated near Memphis, Tennessee, until April 1865, after which it returned to Vicksburg for occupation duties. The soldiers were mustered out of federal service in January 1866.

== 1st Mississippi Cavalry, African Descent ==
=== Formation ===
When President Abraham Lincoln issued the Emancipation Proclamation on 1 January 1863, he also called for four regiments to be raised from African-Americans. Altogether, 166 so-called colored regiments were raised before the war ended, employing 300,000 soldiers. These included 1 engineer, 1 field artillery, 145 infantry, 12 heavy artillery, and 7 cavalry regiments, of which around 60 actually saw field operations. Of the personnel assigned to these regiments, 143 officers (who were white) and 2,751 enlisted men were killed or died of their wounds. The 1st Mississippi Cavalry Regiment (African Descent) was organized on 9 October 1863 at Vicksburg, Mississippi. On 10 October 1863, Colonel Embury D. Osband assumed command of the regiment. Osband was formerly a captain in the 4th Illinois Cavalry Regiment who joined that unit on 26 September 1861.

The War Department established the Bureau for Colored Troops; this body determined which white soldiers to commission as officers for the new colored regiments. Non-commissioned officers were African-American. At first there was a stigma attached to white officers in the colored regiments, but this was quickly overcome by the prospect of rapid promotion. Soon there was a large volume of white applicants for the new positions. When Osband was presented with a list of five corporals and 15 privates from the 4th Illinois Cavalry to be commissioned as officers in the new regiment, he refused to accept it. Instead, he petitioned Brigadier General Lorenzo Thomas, who was in charge of organizing the colored regiments, to consider his own list of candidates. Osband's bid was successful and no one with a rank lower than sergeant was promoted to captain and only two privates were promoted to first lieutenant. Osband's company of the 4th Illinois Cavalry had served as escort to Major General Ulysses S. Grant since November 1861, which probably helped Osband's appeal. Grant suggested to Osband that he recruit his regiment, "from the plantations around [Vicksburg] owned by persons of disloyalty". The other men appointed field officers were Majors Jeremiah B. Cook, Charles H. Chapin, and Edwin M. Main.

=== Service ===
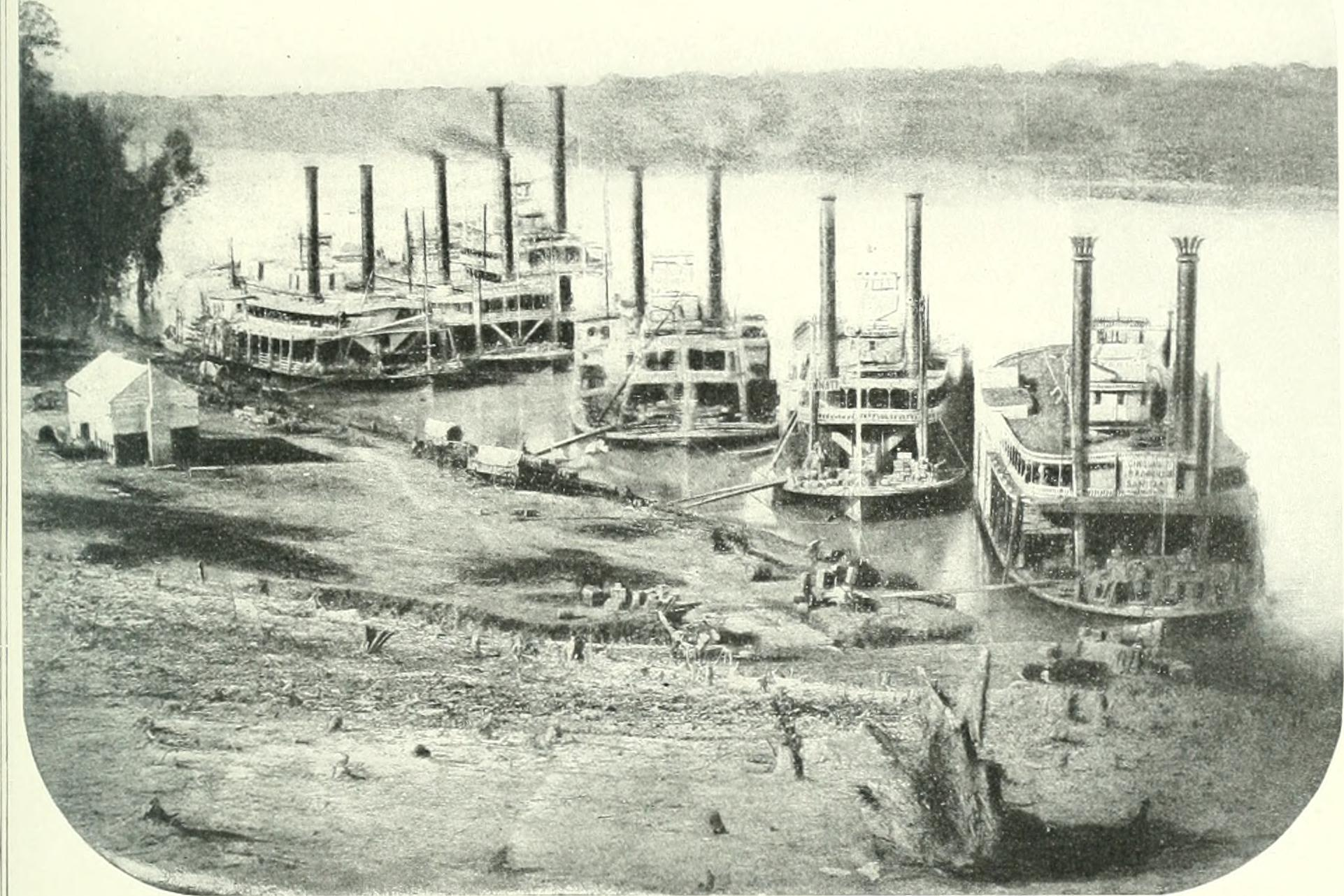
Control of the waterways allowed the Federals to easily move troops by boat. This photo shows steamboats tied up at Pittsburg Landing after the Battle of Shiloh in April 1862.

From its formation until January 1864, the 1st Mississippi Cavalry (African Descent) was attached to the post of Goodrich Landing, District of Northeast Louisiana. With the first formed company of the 1st Mississippi Cavalry (AD) and a battalion of the 4th Illinois Cavalry, Osband led a raid to Satartia, a village 30 mi (48 km) northeast of Vicksburg. By November 1863, the regiment had 131 officers and men organized into three companies. Their patrols seized six 500 lb (227 kg) bales of cotton and gathered 60 more recruits. On 10–13 November, the unit took part in an expedition to Tallulah, Louisiana. In December, Osband took 125 officers and men from the 1st Mississippi Cavalry (AD) and 76 from the 4th Illinois Cavalry across to the west bank of the Mississippi River. They rode 15 mi (24 km) inland and then followed the Boeuf River (Bayou Boeuf) north a short distance, capturing 15 Confederates along the way. That night, Osband posted vedettes on the roads and the troops camped at Meriwether Plantation. Before daylight on 13 December, over 100 Confederates from Capers' Partisan Louisiana Battalion opened fire on the campsite of the 4th Illinois. In the hour-long fight that followed, Osband's force lost 7 killed, 33 wounded, and 13 captured, of which 1 killed and 15 wounded were from the 1st Mississippi (AD). Osband then withdrew the expedition to Skipwith Landing.

After performing garrison duty at Skipwith Landing until January 1864, the 1st Mississippi Cavalry (AD) was assigned to the 1st Brigade, U.S. Colored Troops, District of Vicksburg. On 31 January 1864, 947 officers and men of the 1st Mississippi Cavalry (AD), 8th Louisiana Infantry (AD), and 11th Illinois Infantry Regiments under Colonel James Henry Coates started from Vicksburg with five gunboats and six transports. The expedition entered Yazoo River and stopped at Haynes Bluff to pick up a detachment of 11 officers and 25 men from the 1st Mississippi (AD). At Satartia, the cavalry and some infantry were landed to drive Confederates out of the village. On 3 February, the expedition was fired on by artillery at Liverpool Heights, so troops were landed and skirmished with Brigadier General Lawrence Sullivan Ross' 500-man Texas cavalry brigade. The indecisive fighting cost the Federals 6 killed, 21 wounded, and 8 missing. Coates decided to report these activities to his superior at Vicksburg, so Sergeants Isaac Trendall and Washington Vincent of the 1st Mississippi Cavalry (AD) were selected to carry the message 60 mi (97 km) overland through Confederate-controlled territory. The two men dressed as plantation slaves and stole four horses along the way, successfully delivering the message to Vicksburg in 10 hours.

Meanwhile, Ross' brigade was called away to oppose Major General William T. Sherman's Meridian campaign. Coates' expedition occupied Yazoo City on 9 February 1864 where they were joined by five companies of the 1st Mississippi Cavalry (AD) which marched overland. Coates' expedition moved up the Yazoo River to Greenwood on 14 February. Coates sent Osband and 250 cavalrymen to scout toward Grenada on 16 February and they returned the next day. Coates' force descended the Yazoo to reach Yazoo City with 1,729 bales of cotton by 28 February. By this time Ross' brigade returned to the area and routed a patrol of 43 troopers of the 1st Mississippi Cavalry (AD), inflicting 18 casualties. Osband later examined the scene and concluded that five of his soldiers had been murdered. Ross was soon joined by 550 men from Brigadier General Robert V. Richardson's Tennessee brigade and the combined force attacked in the Battle of Yazoo City on 5 March. The 11th Illinois was surrounded but refused to surrender. The other units were driven into the town but fought back, assisted by the fire of two Union gunboats. The Confederates recaptured some of the cotton bales, but finally withdrew after sustaining 64 casualties. Union casualties for the entire expedition numbered 183 of which 13 were from the 1st Mississippi (AD) and 144 from the 8th Louisiana (AD). The Federal expedition abandoned Yazoo City the next day and steamed downriver to Vicksburg with its cotton bales. Second Lieutenants Eugene E. Walter and Archibald Stewart were killed in action at Yazoo City on 5 March 1864.

== 3rd U.S. Colored Cavalry ==
=== Spring and summer 1864 ===
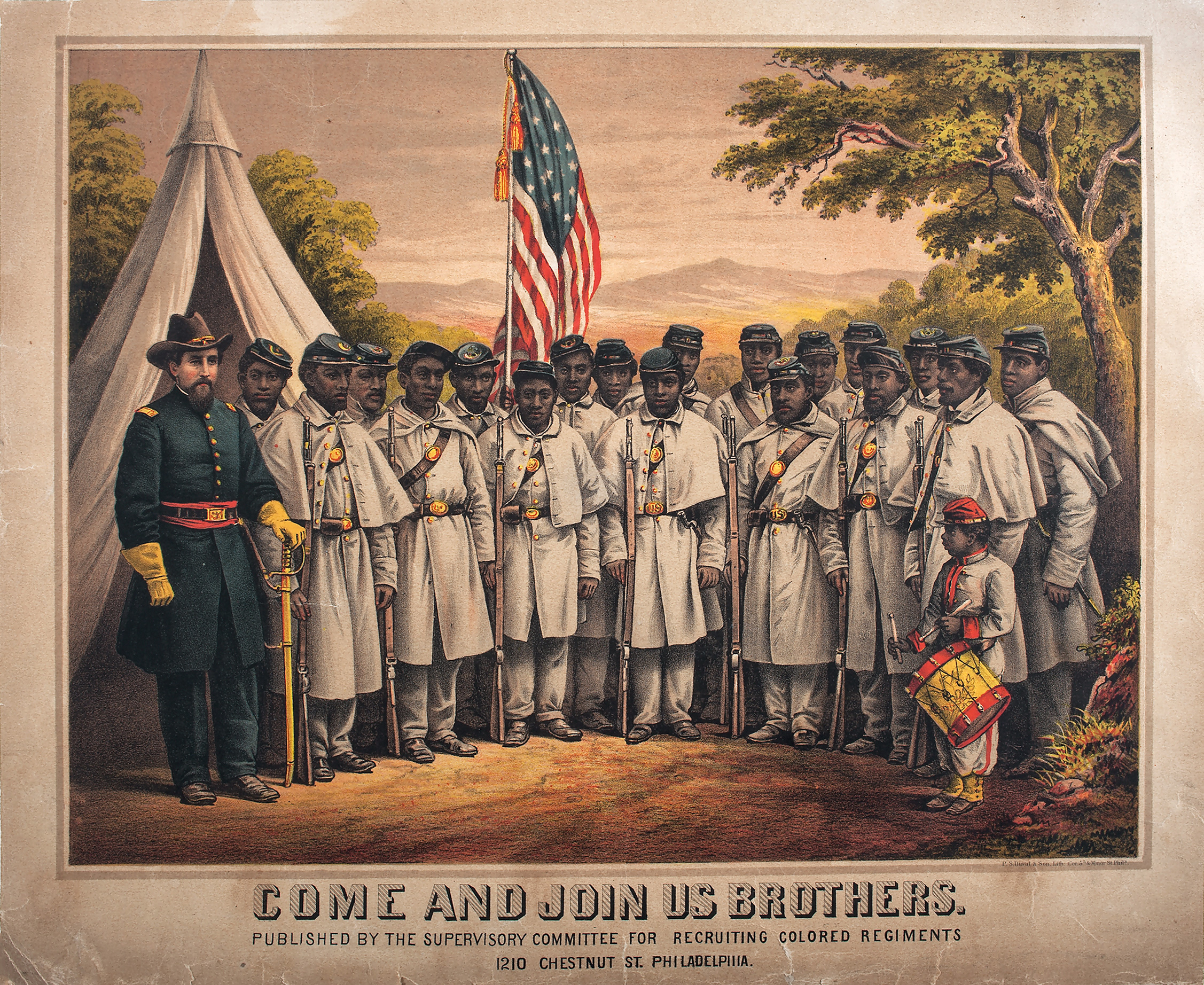
Civil War recruiting poster for black soldiers. Note that the officer is white.

The 1st Mississippi Cavalry (African Descent) was renamed the 3rd U.S. Colored Cavalry Regiment (3rd USCC) on 11 March 1864. The unit was attached to the 1st Brigade, United States Colored Troops, District of Vicksburg, Department of the Tennessee until April 1864. The regiment performed duty in the Vicksburg District until December 1864. The 3rd USCC was in action at Roach's Plantation, Mississippi, on 30 March. It was assigned to Winslow's Cavalry Brigade, District of Vicksburg from April–December 1864. A detachment was sent to Columbus, Kentucky, where it was in action on 11 and 13 April. The regiment took part in an expedition from Haynes Bluff up the Yazoo River on 19–23 April, skirmishing at Mechanicsburg on 20 April. The unit transferred to the 3rd Brigade, Cavalry Division, District of West Tennessee until January 1865. The regiment participated in the Yazoo City expedition on 4–21 May, fighting at Benton on 7 and 9 May and Yazoo City on 13 May. Captain George C. Starr died 14 May 1864 of wounds received at Benton.

On 2–10 July 1864, the 3rd USCC took part in an expedition from Vicksburg to the Pearl River. The primary objective was the destruction of a railroad bridge over the Pearl River near Jackson. A secondary objective was to divert Confederate forces in the area from joining General Nathan Bedford Forrest's troops opposing Union General Andrew Jackson Smith's expedition to Tupelo. The 2,800-man expedition reached Jackson and destroyed the bridge, but the Federals suffered 250 casualties, including 8 officers and men killed and 10 men wounded from the 3rd USCC. On 11 July, the expedition set out from the Big Black River and marched to Port Gibson and ultimately Grand Gulf. From the latter place, the expedition traveled via steamboat to Vicksburg, arriving on 17 July.

On 26 August, the 3rd USCC was in action at Bayou Tensas in Louisiana. The unit also participated in an expedition from Goodrich Landing to Bayou Macon on 28–31 August. On 19 September, the Union commander at Natchez reported that Forrest's cavalry was foraging in the area. Meanwhile, Osband was appointed to command all the cavalry in the district, so Major Cook assumed command of the 3rd USCC. Osband ordered Cook and 330 troopers to march north from Vicksburg and destroy Confederate supplies in the area between the Mississippi and Yazoo Rivers. On 22 September, Cook's men chased 150 Confederate horsemen 15 mi (24 km) to the Sunflower River and burned the plantation where they were camped. On 23 September, the 3rd USCC discovered a herd of 300 cattle and killed five and captured eight herders. About 100 of the animals escaped by the time the regiment returned to Vicksburg on 26 September.

=== Fall and winter 1864 ===
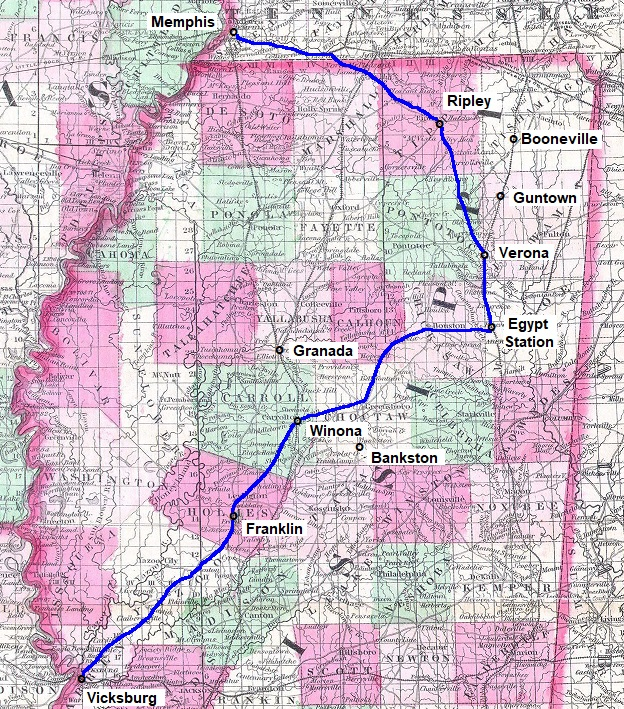
Map shows the route of Grierson's 1864–1865 raid.

On 29 September 1864, Osband led 1,000 men from the 3rd USCC and three white cavalry regiments down the Mississippi River by boat to Bruinsburg where they disembarked. After marching inland to Port Gibson, the force scattered a band of Confederate irregulars. Following the orders of his superior Major General Napoleon J.T. Dana, Osband seized 13 hostages and 125 cattle which they turned over to the 48th and 50th United States Colored Infantry Regiments. The cavalry column then headed for Natchez which was reached on 3 October. On 4 October, 1,200 cavalrymen from five cavalry regiments and two guns boarded steamboats at Natchez and went downstream to Tunica Bend where the force went ashore. Osband led the troops 20 mi (32 km) inland to Woodville which they reached on the evening of 5 October. After seizing a few prisoners and some supply wagons, they were informed by a local black man that a Confederate force was camped at the McGehee plantation nearby. Sending the 5th Illinois Cavalry Regiment behind the Confederates, Osband attacked in front. The 3rd USCC seized three cannons and forced the opposing troops to retreat toward the 5th Illinois, which captured 41 Confederates. There were no Federal casualties. After burning the plantation, the expedition returned to Natchez where it embarked for Vicksburg on 9 October.

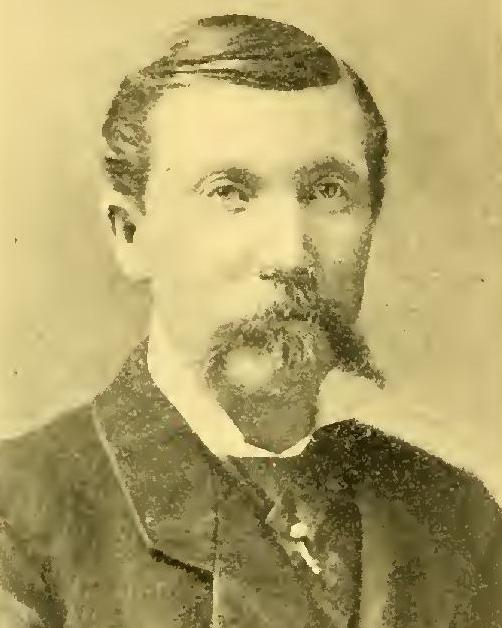
Major Edwin Main

The 3rd USCC and three other cavalry regiments conducted operations in Issaqueena and Washington counties on 21–31 October 1864. Only two Confederate partisans were killed, but Osband reported that the expedition took hostages and seized 50,000 board-feet of lumber, 20,000 bricks, 100 horses and mules, 300 sheep, and 50 cattle. Osband also complained to Dana that the hardtack issued to the 3rd USCC was so riddled with worms that the men threw it away. The next operation was an expedition from Vicksburg to Gaines Landing, Arkansas, on 6–8 November. This proved abortive because of high water. On 23 November, Osband left Vicksburg with 2,200 cavalry, including the 3rd USCC and four other cavalry regiments, and eight guns with the goal of destroying the Mississippi Central Railroad bridge over the Big Black River at Vaughan's Station. The 3rd USCC and the 2nd Wisconsin Cavalry Regiment crossed the Big Black and marched 15 mi (24 km) east in a feint. At dark, the two regiments started campfires, but slipped back to the crossing point to rejoin the rest of the column. Leaving the 5th United States Colored Heavy Artillery Regiment to guard the crossing, the expedition moved northeast through Benton and reached Vaughan's Station on 27 November. Osband sent the 3rd USCC under Cook 4 mi (6.4 km) south to seize the bridge. The troopers captured a blockhouse, killing three defenders at a cost of three men wounded. Then they set the bridge on fire and rode away. Unknown to them, a Confederate cavalry force arrived soon after and put out the fire. After wrecking sections of the railroad, Osband's column moved west to Yazoo City on 29 November and southwest to Vicksburg on 4 December. Cook was promoted to lieutenant colonel on 27 November 1864.

On Dana's orders, Osband's brigade moved to Memphis, where it joined Brigadier General Benjamin Grierson's division. On 21 December 1864, Grierson's 3,500 cavalry set out from Memphis to damage the Mobile and Ohio Railroad. In the rainy weather, many horses broke down and had to be abandoned, but other horses were seized from civilians by the soldiers. Grierson's column reached Ripley, Mississippi, and Osband's brigade wrecked 0.5 mi (0.8 km) of railroad track and trestles south of Tupelo. Grierson's column continued south to Egypt Station which it reached on 28 December. During the Battle of Egypt Station, Osband's brigade supported the brigade of Colonel Joseph Kargé which was already engaged. The 3rd USCC got in rear of the Confederate-held stockade, but by the time the regiment was ready to attack, the stockade's 500 defenders surrendered. Grierson's division marched west to Houston and southwest to Winona. On 1 January 1865, Grierson sent Osband's brigade south from Winona to destroy track on the Mississippi Central Railroad. The 3rd USCC and the 4th Illinois Cavalry Regiment destroyed 2.5 mi (4.0 km) of track and bridges. Learning that a Confederate force was ahead, Osband shifted his route farther to the west. On 2 January near Franklin, Osband's brigade with the 3rd USCC in the lead, ran into a Confederate force under Brigadier General William Wirt Adams. The 3rd USCC was soon supported by the 4th and 11th Illinois Cavalry Regiments and the 90 minute skirmish ended with both sides disengaging. Osband reported First Lieutenant Seward Pettingill of the 3rd USCC and three enlisted men killed, one officer and seven men wounded, and two men missing. Osband's brigade joined Grierson's main column that night. The raiders reached Vicksburg on 5 January.

=== 1865–1866 ===
The 3rd USCC moved from Vicksburg to Memphis on 5–10 January 1865. The regiment was assigned as Unattached Cavalry, District of West Tennessee in January–June 1865. On 28 January, Osband and 2,621 cavalry went ashore at Gaines Landing and headed inland toward Monroe, Louisiana. The 3rd USCC was the largest unit in the expedition, numbering 450 officers and men. The object of the raid was to destroy Confederate supplies. In snow and sleet storms, the column made it as far as Bastrop, Louisiana, before turning back to the Mississippi River, followed by 400 escaped slaves. Osband reported that it was, "the most fatiguing scout of my life". Eight soldiers of the 3rd USCC drowned and twenty escaped slaves died of exposure.

The 3rd USCC performed duties in the District of West Tennessee until April 1865. The unit took part in an expedition from Memphis on 23–26 April, (Note: Dyer stated that the force went to Brownsville, Mississippi, but Dobak noted that the force disembarked near Fort Pillow so the real objective may have been Brownsville, Tennessee.) the object of which was the capture of guerillas. One man named in their orders was caught, tried, and hanged. The regiment moved to Vicksburg on 29 April – 1 May and searched for Jefferson Davis near Natchez and Fort Adams. After the war ended the regiment undertook occupation duties and was assigned to the 1st Brigade, Cavalry Division, District of West Tennessee from June 1865 to January 1866. The 3rd USCC mustered out of service on 26 January 1866.

== Casualties ==
According to the Official Army Register, the 3rd USCC Regiment sustained the following recorded casualties. The only dates given were those listed for the Yazoo City actions.

Union Army: 3rd United States Colored Cavalry Regiment Casualties (Note: Events are listed in the same order as in the Official Army Register. Presumably, Yazoo Expedition lists casualties exclusive of those sustained during the 5 March 1864 action at Yazoo City. Note that casualties listed in the table often do not match those listed in the article.)
| Action | Officers Killed | Enlisted Killed | Officers Wounded | Enlisted Wounded | Officers Missing | Enlisted Missing |
|---|---|---|---|---|---|---|
| Bayou Boeuf | 0 | 1 | 0 | 0 | 0 | 0 |
| Yazoo City (5 March 1864) | 2 | 0 | 0 | 9 | 0 | 3 |
| Yazoo Expedition | 0 | 8 | 1 | 3 | 0 | 10 |
| Roache's Plantation | 0 | 16 | 0 | 3 | 0 | 1 |
| Haynes Bluff | 0 | 0 | 0 | 1 | 0 | 0 |
| Yazoo City (13 May 1864) | 0 | 0 | 0 | 0 | 0 | 5 |
| Vicksburg | 0 | 0 | 0 | 1 | 0 | 0 |
| Jackson | 0 | 1 | 0 | 0 | 0 | 0 |
| Fort Adams | 0 | 0 | 0 | 1 | 0 | 0 |
| Franklin | 1 | 1 | 0 | 0 | 0 | 0 |
| Yazoo City (15 March 1865) | 0 | 0 | 0 | 1 | 0 | 0 |

== See also ==
- List of United States Colored Troops Civil War units

== Notes ==
Footnotes

Citations
