= 109th Illinois Infantry Regiment =

- Flag of Illinois
- Active: September 11, 1862 – April 10, 1863
- Disbanded: April 10, 1863
- Country: United States
- Allegiance: Union
- Branch: Infantry
- Size: Regiment
- Engagements: American Civil War: Vicksburg Campaign

Commanders
- Colonel: Alexander Nimmo
- Lt. Colonel: Elijah A. Willard
- Major: Thomas M. Perrine

The 109th Illinois Volunteer Infantry Regiment was a unit created during the call for 300,000 volunteers during the summer and fall of 1862.

== Service ==
The regiment was formed of men from Union County, Illinois, Alexander County, Illinois, Jackson County, Illinois, Johnson County, Illinois, and Pulaski County, Illinois. The men were organized at Camp Anna near Anna, Illinois and were mustered into service on September 11, 1862. From the beginning the regiment suffered from low morale, which was exacerbated by being issued "inferior" weapons.

The regiment remained in Anna until October 20, when it was ordered to Cairo, Illinois and then to Columbus, Kentucky. It joined the Army of the Tennessee commanded by Major General Ulysses S. Grant and spent most of the fall guarding railroads and supplies around in west Tennessee. Due to poor organization and the dismal state of their weapons they were deemed unfit for combat and spent most of the rest of the winter at Holly Springs, Mississippi and Memphis, Tennessee.

Traveling with the rest of the Army of the Tennessee down the Mississippi River in preparation for the assault on Vicksburg. Morale continued to plunge while the 109th was at Lake Providence, Louisiana and the number of deserters climbed to 237. High command decided that the regiment would be better if it was disbanded and broken up. Most of the officers were sent home or to other commands, and the remaining men were transferred to the 11th Illinois Volunteer Infantry Regiment.

== Casualties ==
During the short-term of service for the 109th Illinois, they never saw combat and lost 2 officers and 92 men died by disease. These losses were augmented by the desertion of at least 237 men.

== See also ==
- List of Illinois Civil War Units
