= Meridian campaign =

1864 military campaign of the American Civil War

- Part of the American Civil War
Date	February 14, 1864 – February 20, 1864 (6 days)
Location	Lauderdale County, Mississippi 32.3654°N 88.7043°W
Result	Union victory

Belligerents
United States (Union)	Confederate States

Commanders and leaders
(United States) William T. Sherman	(Confederate States of America) Leonidas Polk

Units involved
Army of the Tennessee	Department of Alabama, Mississippi and East Louisiana

Strength
26,847	14,000 (9,000 infantry and 5,000 cavalry)

Casualties and losses
341	288

The Meridian campaign or Meridian expedition took place from February 14, 1864 – February 20, 1864, from Vicksburg, Mississippi to Meridian, Mississippi, by the Union Army of the Tennessee, led by Maj. Gen. William Tecumseh Sherman. Sherman captured Meridian, Mississippi, inflicting heavy damage to it. The campaign is viewed by historians as a prelude to Sherman's March to the Sea (Savannah campaign) in that a large swath of damage and destruction was inflicted on Central Mississippi as Sherman marched across the state and back.

Two supporting columns were under the command of Brigadier General William Sooy Smith and Colonel James Henry Coates. Smith's expedition was tasked to destroy a rebel cavalry commanded by Major General Nathan Bedford Forrest, maintain communications with Middle Tennessee and take men from the defense on the Mississippi River to the Atlanta campaign. To maintain communications, it was to protect the Mobile and Ohio Railroad. Coates' expedition moved up the Yazoo River and for a while occupied Yazoo City, Mississippi.

== Background ==
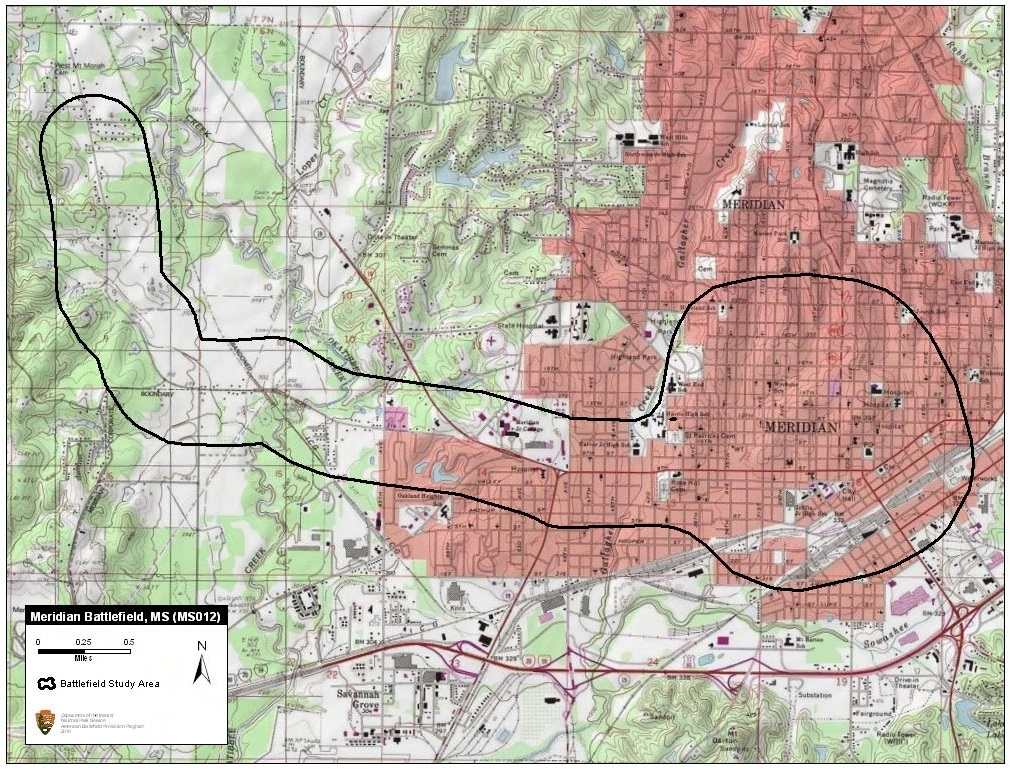
Map of Meridian Battlefield study area by the American Battlefield Protection Program

After the Chattanooga campaign Union forces under Sherman returned to Vicksburg and headed eastward toward Meridian. Meridian was an important railroad center and was home to a Confederate arsenal, military hospital, and prisoner-of-war stockade, as well as the headquarters for a number of state offices.

Sherman planned to take Meridian and, if the situation was favorable, push on to Selma, Alabama. He also wished to threaten Mobile enough to force the Confederates to reinforce their defenses. While Sherman set out on February 3, 1864, with the main force of 20,000 men from Vicksburg, he ordered Brig. Gen. William Sooy Smith to lead a cavalry force of 7,000 men from Memphis, Tennessee, south through Okolona, Mississippi, along the Mobile and Ohio Railroad to meet the rest of the Union force at Meridian.

== March to Meridian ==
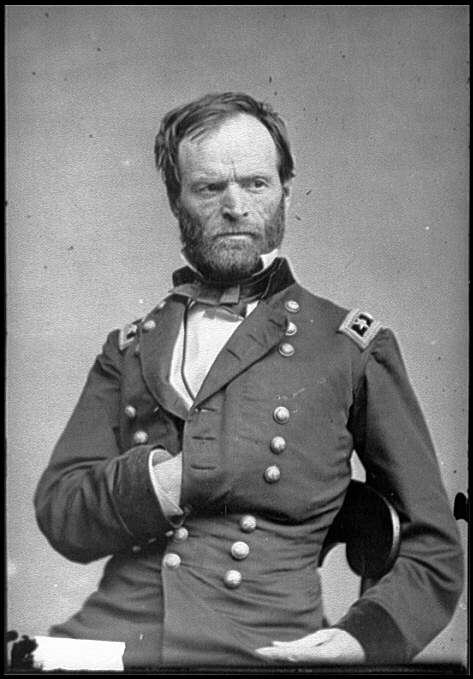
Maj. Gen. William Tecumseh Sherman, commander of Union forces in the Meridian campaign

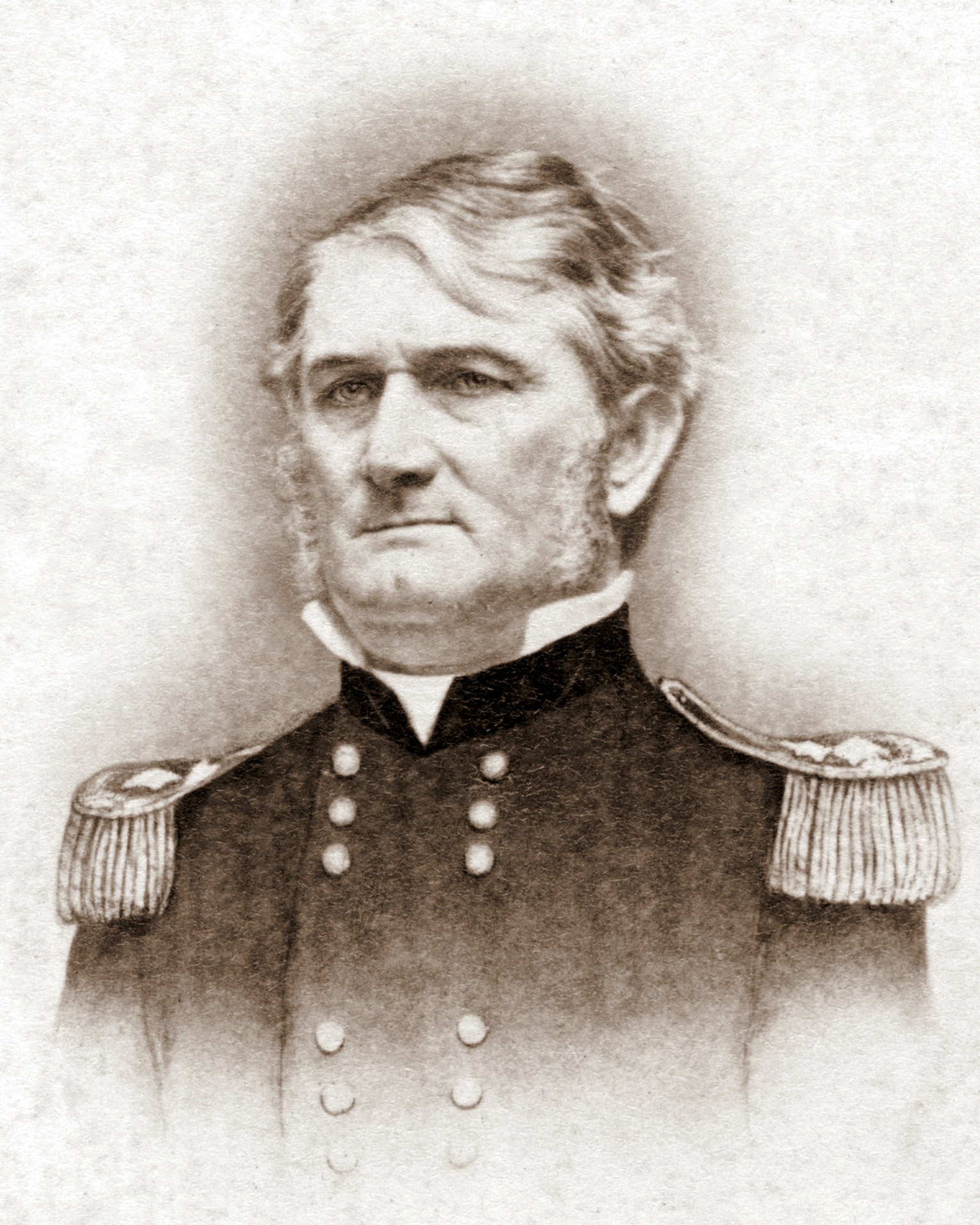
Lt. Gen. Leonidas Polk, commander of Confederate forces during the Meridian campaign

To counter the threat, Confederate President Jefferson Davis ordered troops to the area from other localities. The Confederate commander in the area, Lt. Gen. Leonidas Polk, consolidated a number of commands in and around Morton, Mississippi. Polk only had about 9,000 troops, and greatly outnumbered, he "decided not to give battle to Sherman's infantry. He ordered his cavalry, under Maj. Gen. Stephen D. Lee northward to cooperate with Forrest against Sooy Smith's advancing cavalry; he had hopes of destroying that arm of the Federal force. To [his infantry division commanders], however, he gave 'discretionary orders' to fall back whenever expedient." On the journey towards Meridian, Sherman ordered several feints into other regions of the state to keep Polk guessing about Sherman's true point of attack. Sherman also asked Maj. Gen. Nathaniel Banks, Union commander of the Department of the Gulf at New Orleans, Louisiana, to have boats maneuvering as if they were preparing to attack Mobile. Doing this forced the Confederates to keep troops from leaving Mobile to aid Meridian in case of an attack on the gulf. To further confuse Polk, Sherman sent gunboats and infantry up the Yazoo River to divert his attention. Cavalry units commanded by Lee periodically skirmished with Sherman's force. As Sherman approached Meridian, he met stiffer resistance from the combined forces but steadily moved on. Polk evacuated Meridian on February 14, falling back to Demopolis, Alabama. "This was a well-timed and well-directed withdrawal. All stores at Meridian and all at Enterprise 'except corn in the shuck' were saved. All shop tools and rolling stock 'except eight or ten cars' were likewise moved to safety... Sherman moved into Meridian the day Polk moved out."

== Smith's troubles ==
Polk urged Forrest and Lee to defeat Sooy Smith, stating that if this could be achieved, Sherman's whole army "must come to a bad end." He later recorded that "if Sherman was deprived of [Sooy Smith's] presence and services to procure forage and subsistence for his army it must starve and destruction by starvation was as effectual as destruction by battle." Smith never reached Meridian; he and his troops met Confederate resistance led by Forrest at West Point, Mississippi. Forrest and his army forced Smith to begin to retreat to Tennessee. When Forrest saw Smith's army retreating, he ordered his troops to chase the army down. Forrest caught Smith and his troops in Okolona, Mississippi, and forced them to retreat more rapidly after a defeat in the Battle of Okolona on February 22, 1864, which ultimately resulted in General Sherman's entire left flank being eliminated during the campaign.

== Destruction of Meridian ==
Sherman's army reached Meridian on February 14, 1864. Still unaware of Smith's defeat at West Point and the one to come at Okolona, Sherman decided to continue waiting for Smith in Meridian until the morning of February 20, when he gave up and returned to Vicksburg. While he and his army were waiting, Sherman ordered his troops "to wipe the appointed meeting place off the map" by destroying the railroads and burning much of the area to the ground. Sherman's troops destroyed 115 mi (185 km) of railroad, 61 bridges, 6,075 ft (1,852 m) of trestle work, 20 locomotives, 28 cars, and 3 steam sawmills. After the troops departed, inhabitants of the city were without food for some days, but the soldiers had not directly inflicted any personal injuries during the attack. After the destruction of the economic and military infrastructure of Meridian, Sherman is reported to have said, "Meridian with its depots, store-houses, arsenal, hospitals, offices, hotels, and cantonments no longer exists."

Conversely, Polk reported to President Davis that "the vigorous action of my cavalry under General Lee kept [Sherman] so closed up that he could not spread out and forage. As an evidence of this, a drove of hogs of mine was on the way east and pursued a route within 6 miles on an average of his line of march without molestation and have arrived safely. He was deprived entirely of the rolling stock of all the roads between the Pearl and Tombigbee Rivers, as well as of the use of all the valuable stores which had been accumulated at depots on those roads... I have already taken measures to have all the roads broken up by him rebuilt, and shall press that work vigorously. The amount of road destroyed by him may be in all about 50 miles, extending out on the four roads from Meridian as a center." Polk's work crews repaired the damage to the railroad by March 24, 1864. The Memphis Daily Appeal wrote: "We think the repairing of the Mobile and Ohio road will compare with Yankee Enterprise."

When Sherman left Meridian, heading west by way of Canton, Mississippi, he was still unaware of Smith's defeats, so he began looking for Smith and his force. He did not discover what happened to Smith until he arrived back at Vicksburg. Sherman had destroyed some important Confederate transportation facilities but was unable to continue into Alabama. In his Memoirs (1885) Sherman denies any intention of going to Mobile: "in the following letter to General Banks, of January 31st, written from Vicksburg before starting for Meridian, it will be seen clearly that I indicated my intention to keep up the delusion of an attack on Mobile by land, whereas I promised him to be back to Vicksburg by the 1st of March . . . ."

== Yazoo Expedition ==
On January 31, 1864, Coates and 947 men from the 11th Illinois Infantry Regiment and 8th Louisiana Infantry Regiment (African Descent) left Vicksburg aboard six river transports and five gunboats. The expedition steamed up the Yazoo River to occupy Yazoo City on February 9. They were joined there by 250 men from the 1st Mississippi Cavalry Regiment (African Descent) and the expedition continued upriver to reach Greenwood, Mississippi, on February 14. Descending the Yazoo River, the expedition returned to Yazoo City on February 28 after seizing over 1,700 bales of cotton. On March 5, Coates' force repulsed an attack by two brigades of Confederate cavalry under Lawrence Sullivan Ross and Robert V. Richardson in the Battle of Yazoo City. Following orders, Coates abandoned Yazoo City on March 6 and returned to Vicksburg.

== Timeline ==
A summary of skirmishes and battles:

- February 3: General Sherman’s column left Vicksburg, Mississippi and faced multiple skirmishes at Liverpool Heights
- February 4: at Champion’s Hill, Queen’s Hill, Edwards’ Ferry, and near Bolton Depot
- February 5: at Baker’s Creek, Clinton, Jackson
- February 6–18: advanced from Memphis, Tennessee to Wyatt, Mississippi
  - February 6: at Hillsborough
  - February 7: skirmishes at Brandon, Morton, Satartia
  - February 8: Coldwater Ferry, near Morton; near and at Senatobia
- February 9: Yazoo City was occupied by Union forces until March 6.
- February 10: skirmishes at Hillsborough, Morton
- February 11: Brigadier General W. Sooy Smith’s Column advanced from Collierville, Tennessee with further skirmishes at Raiford’s Plantation.
- February 12: Wall Hill, Holly Springs
- February 13: skirmishes at Wyatt
- February 13–14: skirmishes between Chunky Creek and Meridian
- February 14 to 20: Meridian was occupied by Union forces.
- February 15 to 17: Further skirmishes at Marion Station
- February 16: Lauderdale Springs.
- February 17: skirmish near Pontotoc, Houlka Swamp
- February 18: skirmish near Okolona, Aberdeen.
- February 19: Houston, Egypt Station, near Meridian
- February 20: near West Point
- February 21: Ellis’ Bridge, West Point, Prairie Station, Okolona
- February 21–22: at Union
- February 22: Battle of Okolona, and near Ivey’s Hill, Tallahatchie
- February 23: skirmish near New Albany; skirmish at Tippah River, Canton
- February 25: at Hudsonville
- February 26: near Canton
- February 27: at Madisonville, Sharon
- February 28: at Pearl River, Mississippi
- February 29: near Canton
- March 2: at Canton, near Yazoo City
- March 3: at Liverpool, Brownsville. General William Tecumseh Sherman’s column arrived at Vicksburg on March 4.
- March 5: Yazoo City was attacked and abandoned by Union forces on March 6.

== Divisions ==
The 16th Army Corps was under the command of Major General Stephen A. Hurlbut. The First Division was under the command of Brigadier General James M. Tuttle. It was composed of the First Brigade under Col. William L. McMillen, Second Brigade under Brigadier General Joseph A. Mower, Third Brigade under Col. James L. Geddes, and Artillery under Captain Nelson T. Spoor. The Third Division was under the command of Brigadier General Andrew J. Smith. It was composed of the First Brigade under Col. David Moore, Second Brigade under Col. William T. Shaw, Third Brigade under Col. Edward H. Wolfe and Col. Risdon M. Moore, and Artillery was under Captain James M. Cockefair. The Fourth Division was under the command of Brigadier General James C. Veatch. It was composed of the First Brigade under Col. Milton Montgomery and Second Brigade under Col. James H. Howe.

The 17th Army Corps was under the command of General James B. McPherson. The First Division was composed of the Third Brigade under Brigadier General Alexander Chambers. Third Division was under Brigadier General Mortimer D. Leggett. It was composed of the First Brigade under Brigadier General Manning F. Force, Second Brigade under Col. Benjamin F. Potts, Third Brigade under Brigadier General Jasper A. Maltby and Artillery under Captain William S. Williams. The Fourth Division was under Brigadier General Marcellus M. Crocker. It was composed of the First Brigade under Brigadier General Thomas Kilby Smith, Second Brigade under Col. Cyrus Hall, Third Brigade under Brigadier General Walter Q. Gresham, Artillery under Captain John W. Powell, Cavalry under Col. Edward F. Winslow.

Smith’s Column was commanded by Brigadier General William Sooy Smith. It was composed of the First Brigade under Col. George E. Waring, Jr., Second Brigade under Lieutenant Col. William P. Hepburn, Third Brigade under Col. Lafayette McCrillis, and the 4th United States under Captain Charles S. Bowman.

== Total troops ==
The 16th Army Corps First Division aggregate 5,558 men, Third Division 6,854 men, and Fourth Division 3,735 men. 17th Army Corps Headquarters aggregate 99 men, First Division 2,329 men, Third Division 8,640 men, Fourth Division 7,641 men, Cavalry 4,215 men. The total aggregate of men present and absent on the Meridian expedition was 38,071 men.

== Casualties ==
Federal casualties during the Meridian Campaign were 341 for Sherman, while Sooy Smith's cavalry column lost 388 troops at Okolona on February 22nd. Confederate losses for the Meridian Campaign were 288 for Polk with an additional 144 casualties suffered by Forrest at Okolona.

== Bibliography ==
- Dobak, William A. (2011). "Freedom by the Sword: The U.S. Colored Troops 1862–1867" (PDF). Washington, D.C.: Center of Military History, U.S. Army. pp. 200–202. Archived from the original (PDF) on September 21, 2012.
- United States Congress. Congressional Edition, Volume 2873. (U.S. G.P.O., 1891).
- Sherman, William T. Memoirs of General W.T. Sherman. (March 21, 2014).
- Dinges, Bruce J., Leckie, Shirley A. Just and Righteous Cause: Benjamin H. Grierson’s Civil War Memoir. (Southern Illinois University Press, 2008).
- National Park Service. Mississippi Civil Wars Battles. https://web.archive.org/web/20170703180045/http://www.legendsofamerica.com/ms-civilwarbattles5.html (March 23, 2014).
