= Embury D. Osband =

- Born: June 6, 1832; Ontario County, New York
- Died: October 4, 1866 (aged 34); Yazoo County, Mississippi
- Burial place: Vicksburg National Cemetery
- Military career
- Allegiance: (United States) Union; Illinois
- Branch: Union Army
- Service years: 1861–1865
- Rank: Colonel; Brevet Brigadier General
- Commands: 3rd U.S. Colored Cavalry Regiment; 3rd Bde, Cavalry Div, Dist. of West Tenn.
- Conflicts: American Civil War; Battle of Fort Donelson; Battle of Shiloh; Siege of Corinth; Battle of Coffeeville; Yazoo City expedition; Battle of Egypt Station

Embury D. Osband (June 6, 1832 – October 4, 1866) became the commanding officer of the 3rd United States Colored Cavalry Regiment during the American Civil War. Born in New York, he became a teacher and then started a company that provided books to schools. In 1856, he married and moved to Chicago. When the American Civil War broke out, he raised a company of the 4th Illinois Cavalry Regiment and became its captain. In 1863, he was appointed colonel of a new regiment composed of African-American former slaves. He led the regiment and later a cavalry brigade in Grierson's 1864–65 Raid. He received the brevet rank of brigadier general for war service. After the war, he became a farmer in Mississippi but died in 1866.

== See also ==
- List of American Civil War brevet generals (Union)
