= 5th Illinois Cavalry Regiment =

- Illinois flag
- Active: August 31, 1861, to October 27, 1865
- Country: United States
- Allegiance: Union
- Branch: Cavalry

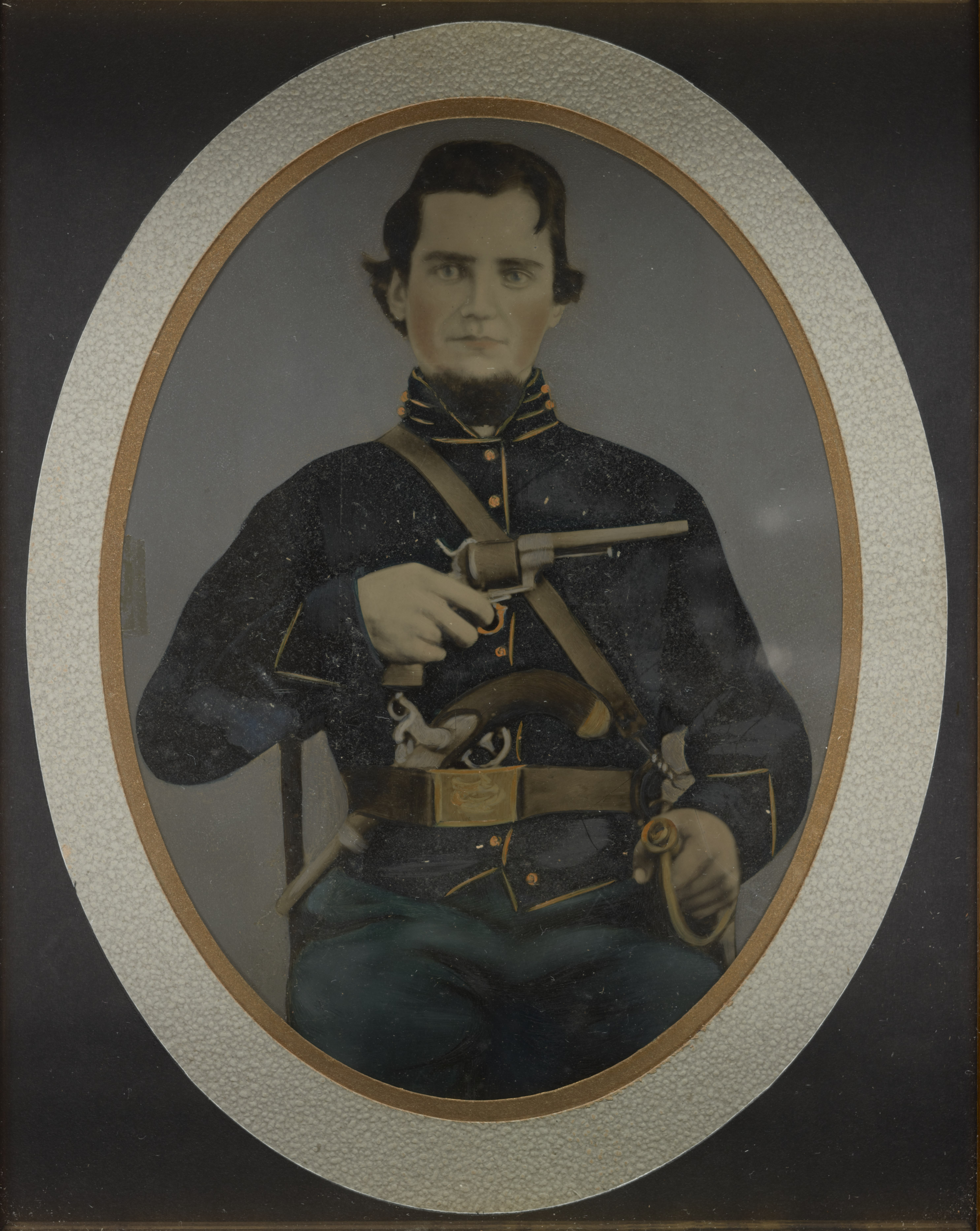
Private Silas York of the 5th Illinois Cavalry Regiment, holding a Lefaucheux M1858

The 5th Illinois Cavalry Regiment was a cavalry regiment that served in the Union Army during the American Civil War.

== Service ==
The 5th Illinois Volunteer Cavalry was mustered into service at Camp Butler, Illinois, on August 31, 1861.

The regiment was mustered out on October 27, 1865.

== Significant Battles and Skirmishes ==
The 5th Illinois Volunteer Cavalry Regiment participated in the Vicksburg campaign. It was under the command of Major Thomas A. Apperson and Major Abel H. Seley. The unit aided Colonel Cyrus Bussey’s Cavalry Brigade during General William T. Sherman’s advance, branching off to attack Confederate forces at Canton, Mississippi, before returning to the main attack force.

The 5th Illinois Volunteer Cavalry Regiment also participated in numerous skirmishes throughout the war. On May 29, 1863, the regiment was relocated to Vicksburg and arrived on June 1 at Snyder’s Bluff. They attacked and defeated Confederate Forces at a fortification. 1 Men was killed and 7 were wounded.

== Total strength and casualties ==
The regiment suffered 28 enlisted men who were killed in action or who died of their wounds and 5 officers and 414 enlisted men who died of disease, for a total of 447 fatalities.

== Commanders ==
- Colonel Hall Wilson: mustered 12 Dec. 1861, resigned 19 Jan. 1863 because of typhoid and diarrhea.
- Colonel John McConnell - mustered out October 27, 1865

== See also ==
- List of Illinois Civil War Units
- Illinois in the American Civil War
