= Brownsville, Mississippi =

- Unincorporated community
- Location within Mississippi Location within the United States
- Coordinates: 32°26′56″N 90°26′13″W
- Country: United States
- State: Mississippi
- County: Hinds
- Elevation: 292 ft (89 m)
- Time zone: UTC-6 (Central (CST))
  - Summer (DST): UTC-5 (CDT)
- ZIP code: 39041
- Area code: 601
- GNIS feature ID: 667652

Brownsville is an unincorporated community located on Mississippi Highway 22 in northern Hinds County, Mississippi. Brownsville is approximately 12 miles (19 km) southwest of Flora and approximately 8 miles (13 km) north of Bolton.

Brownsville is part of the Jackson Metropolitan Statistical Area.

== History ==
Brownsville was originally known as Spring Hill. The name was changed to Brownsville in 1838 in honor of Elisha Brown, who settled in the area in 1830. The local Masonic lodge funded the construction of a male and female school for Brownsville. The community was once home to two churches, two general stores, a drug store, two carriage shops, and a blacksmith shop.

In 1838, the Brownsville Volunteers were organized and made part of the Hinds County regiment of the state of Mississippi.

A post office operated under the name Brownsville from 1838 to 1904.

== Notable person ==
- Thomas C. Catchings, who served Mississippi Attorney General from 1877 to 1885 and as a member of the United States House of Representatives from Mississippi's 3rd congressional district from 1885 to 1901, was born near Brownsville.
