= 11th Illinois Infantry Regiment =

Union infantry regiment during the American Civil War

11th Regiment Illinois Volunteer Infantry
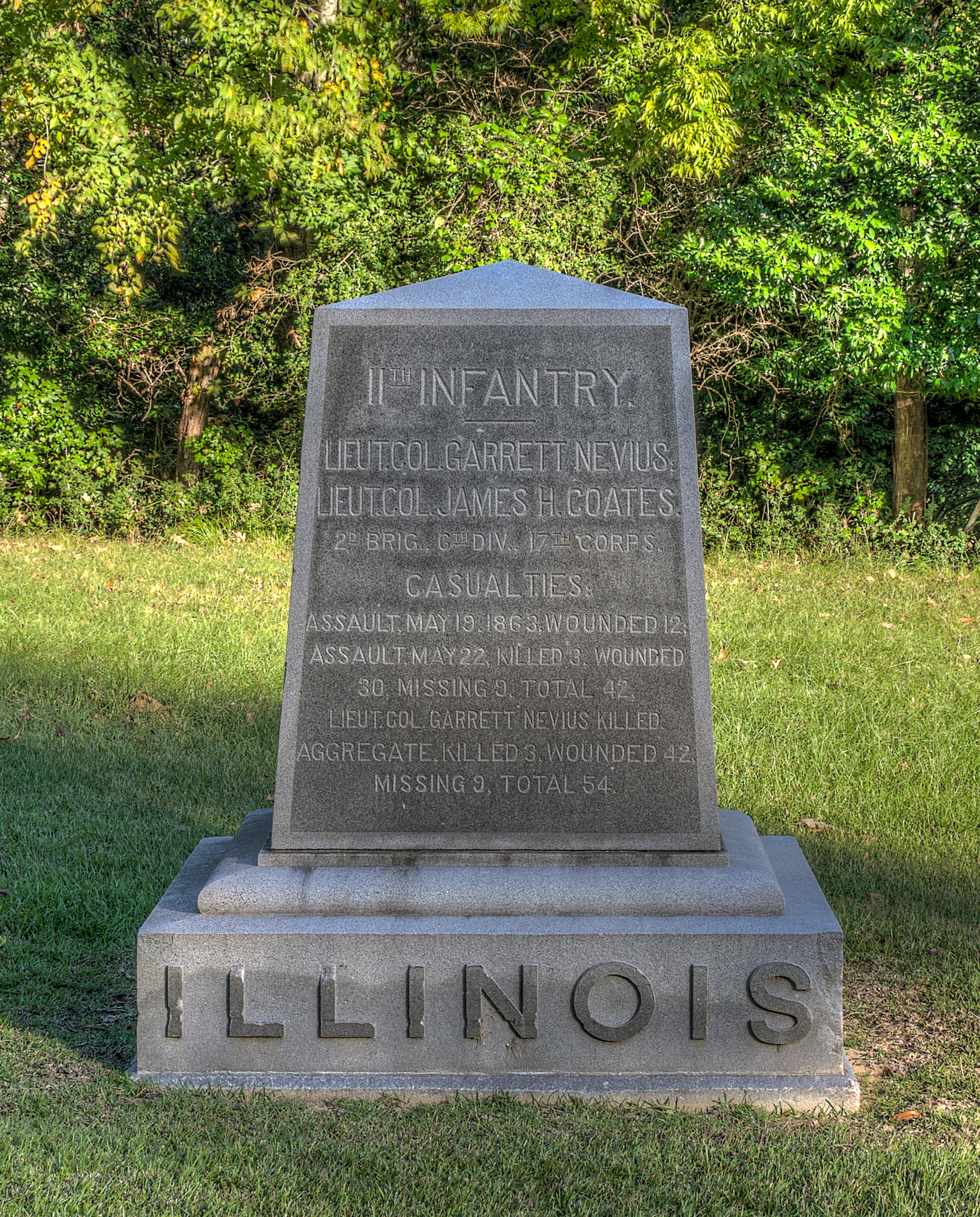
- Memorial at Vicksburg National Military Park
- Active: 30 Apr. 1861 – 30 July 1861; 30 July 1861 – 14 July 1865
- Country: United States
- Allegiance: (United States) Union; Illinois
- Branch: Union Army
- Type: Infantry
- Size: Regiment
- Engagements: American Civil War; Battle of Fort Donelson (1862); Battle of Shiloh (1862); Siege of Corinth (1862); Battle of Riggins Hill (1862); Siege of Vicksburg (1863); Battle of Yazoo City (1864); Yazoo City expedition (1864); Battle of Fort Blakeley (1865)

Commanders
- Notable commanders: W. H. L. Wallace; Thomas E.G. Ransom; James Henry Coates

The 11th Regiment Illinois Volunteer Infantry was an infantry regiment from Illinois that served in the Union Army during the American Civil War. In April 1861, it was formed as a three-month volunteer unit, and in July 1861 it was reorganized as a three-year unit, in which role it served until the end of the war. Two of its commanding officers were promoted to brigadier general and led major units during the war. In its first major action at Fort Donelson the regiment suffered terrible losses. The 11th Illinois also fought at Shiloh, Riggins Hill, Vicksburg, First Yazoo City, Second Yazoo City, and Fort Blakeley. In April 1863, the 109th Illinois Infantry Regiment was disbanded and its enlisted men transferred into the 11th Illinois. The regiment was mustered out of service in July 1865.

== Three-month unit ==
The original 11th Illinois Infantry Regiment organized at Springfield, Illinois. It was mustered into three-months' service on 30 April 1861 by Captain John Pope. The regiment traveled to Villa Ridge on 5 May and was stationed in that location until 20 June. Subsequently, the unit moved to Bird's Point, Missouri from which Companies A and B participated in an expedition to Little River on 22–23 June. It remained at Bird's Point until 30 July when it was mustered out of service. During its service 10 men died of disease. Its field officers were Colonel W. H. L. Wallace, Lieutenant Colonel J. Warren Filler of Effingham, and Major Thomas E. G. Ransom of Vandalia. During service, the regiment ranged between 833 and 933 in strength, while 916 men were mustered out.

== Three-year unit ==
=== Formation and officers ===
The reorganized 11th Illinois Infantry Regiment was mustered into Federal service for a three-year enlistment on 30 July 1861, at Cairo. One source stated that the unit organized at Bird's Point between 29 July and 27 October. Only 288 men re-enlisted from the three-month regiment, but by the end of November, recruiting brought the unit's total strength to 801 men. The field officers were Colonel Wallace, Lieutenant Colonel Ransom, and Major Garrett L. Nevius of Rockford. Other regimental staff included 1 adjutant, 1 quartermaster, 1 surgeon, 1 assistant surgeon, 1 chaplain, 5 sergeant majors, 4 quartermaster sergeants, 5 commissary sergeants, 3 hospital stewards, and 3 musicians. In addition, there was a 16-member band, all from Rockford, who were discharged after serving one year.

Colonel Wallace received promotion to brigadier general on 23 March 1862. He was replaced as colonel by Ransom who was promoted brigadier general on 16 March 1863. Ransom was succeeded as colonel by Nevius who was killed in action on 22 May 1863. Nevius was replaced as colonel by James Henry Coates who received a brevet promotion to brigadier general on 13 March 1865. (Note: The 11th Illinois monument (see photo) and the Illinois Adjutant General spell the name Nevius, while the Official Army Register and Battles & Leaders spell it Nevins.) Three of the 11th Illinois' colonels died in the war. Wallace was fatally wounded while commanding a division at the Battle of Shiloh and died a few days later. Ransom was wounded four times and rose to command the Left Wing of the XVI Corps in the Atlanta campaign, but died of poor health on 29 October 1864. When Coates became colonel on 22 May 1863, Lloyd D. Waddell became lieutenant colonel but he resigned on 15 September 1864. On the same day, George C. McKee became major but he mustered out on 30 July 1864. When the regiment mustered out, Coates was colonel, Nathaniel C. Kenyon was lieutenant colonel, and Samuel O. Lewis was major.

A number of officers gained promotion by transferring to other units. Captain John H. Widmer and Second Lieutenant Douglas Hapeman were promoted major and lieutenant colonel, respectively, in the 104th Illinois Infantry Regiment on 4 September 1862. Captain Charles T. Hotchkiss was promoted lieutenant colonel of the 89th Illinois Infantry Regiment on 4 September 1862. First Lieutenant Hurbert A. McCaleb was promoted lieutenant colonel of the 6th U. S. Colored Heavy Artillery on 7 November 1862. First Lieutenant Samuel B. Dean was promoted major of the 58th U. S. Colored Infantry on 31 August 1863. First Lieutenant Cyrus E. Dickey became Captain and Assistant Adjutant General on 8 June 1863. Major Smith D. Atkins resigned on 17 April 1862 and was promoted colonel of the 92nd Illinois Infantry Regiment on 4 September 1862. Atkins received a brevet promotion to brigadier general on 12 January 1865.

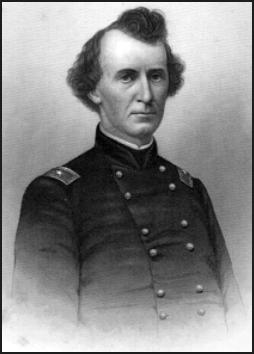
W. H. L. Wallace

Captains and Recruiting Areas of the 11th Illinois Infantry Regiment
Company	Recruiting Area, 3-month	Original Captain, 3-year	Recruiting Area, 3-year
A	Freeport	Smith D. Atkins	Stephenson County
B	Lacon	Frederick W. Shaw	Marshall County
C	Centralia	George C. McKee	Marion County
D	Rockford	William D. E. Andrus	Winnebago County
E	Vandalia	Lloyd D. Waddell	Effingham County
F	Morris	Wilbem M. Boren	Pulaski County
G	Effingham	Lucius M. Ross	various locations
H	Ottawa	James Henry Coates	LaSalle County
I	Ottawa	Greenbury L. Fort	various locations
K	Lasalle	Henry H. Carter	Lasalle County

=== 1861–1862 ===
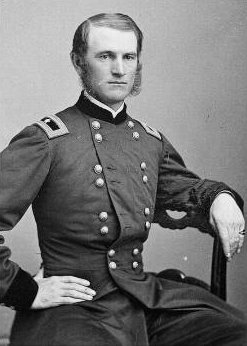
T. E. G. Ransom

The 11th Illinois Infantry Regiment was assigned to W. H. L. Wallace's 3rd Brigade, District of Cairo until February 1862. During this period, the regiment participated in a number of forays into Missouri. These were toward New Madrid on 9–11 September 1861, to Charleston on 6–10 October, to Bloomfield on 3–12 November, and to Sikeston on 25–28 January 1862. The unit also went on a reconnaissance of Columbus, Kentucky on 13–20 January. The 11th Illinois boarded river transports on 2 February and joined the Fort Henry campaign. On 11 February, the regiment began to march toward Fort Donelson which was invested on 12–14 February.

At the Battle of Fort Donelson on 15 February 1862, the 11th Illinois led by Lieutenant Colonel Ransom (who was wounded) was part of Colonel Wallace's 2nd Brigade, Brigadier General John Alexander McClernand's 1st Division, under the overall command of Brigadier General Ulysses S. Grant. That morning, the Confederates attempted to break out of the fort by launching a heavy assault against the 1st Division. After heavy fighting, McClernand's right brigade under Colonel Richard J. Oglesby was forced back and the 11th Illinois on the right flank of Wallace's brigade bore the brunt of the Confederate attacks. The regiment was compelled to retreat though Ransom greatly distinguished himself. At the end of the day, Grant ordered a counterattack which restored the investment; the Confederates surrendered the following day. Out of about 500 effectives, the 11th Illinois suffered 329 casualties, including 72 killed and 182 wounded. On 4–13 March, the regiment moved first to Fort Henry, then to Savannah, Tennessee. On 23–25 March, the unit moved farther up the Tennessee River to Pittsburg Landing, Tennessee.

At the Battle of Shiloh on 6–7 April 1862, the 11th Illinois was attached to Colonel C. Carroll Marsh's 2nd Brigade, McClernand's 1st Division, in Major General Grant's Army of the Tennessee. Both Ransom and Major Nevius were wounded and Captain Waddell took command. On the first day, McClernand ordered Marsh to move his brigade to support Brigadier General William Tecumseh Sherman's division. After first moving to Sherman's right rear, Marsh shifted farther to the left and deployed the 11th, 20th, 45th, and 48th Illinois Infantry Regiments. Ransom wrote that the Confederates came on in, "four ranks and three columns steadily upon us". Marsh's troops were compelled to retreat, during which Captain Coates and his son were both wounded and taken prisoner. While withdrawing, some soldiers stubbornly fought back behind some sacks filled with oats. When Marsh's brigade rallied on a new defense line near Jones Field, a portion of the 70th Ohio Infantry Regiment joined the 11th Illinois and fought with it the rest of the day. At 12:30 pm, Marsh's brigade joined a counterattack by Sherman and McClernand and the 11th and 20th Illinois overran a Confederate Kentucky battery. Ransom was bleeding from a head wound, but continued to lead the regiment until his horse was killed; then he went to the rear. After a two-hour fight, Confederate reinforcements again threw the Union troops back. At Shiloh, the 11th Illinois lost 27 killed and wounded out of 150 total. After the battle, Tommy Newsom erected a monument to the regiment's dead. This became known as the White Post burial place; it was the first monument built on the battlefield.

The 11th Illinois Infantry remained in the 2nd Brigade, 1st Division, Army of the Tennessee until July 1862. The regiment participated in the Siege of Corinth from 29 April–30 May. Afterward, the unit served until 2 August at Jackson, Tennessee, when it moved first to Cairo and then to Paducah, Kentucky, from 23 August to 20 November. The regiment joined an expedition from Fort Donelson to Clarksville, Tennessee, from 5–10 September that resulted in the Battle of Riggins Hill. In this action, Colonel William Warren Lowe led 1,100 Union troops from the 11th Illinois, 71st Ohio, and 13th Wisconsin Infantry Regiments, the 5th Iowa Cavalry Regiment, and Battery C and Battery H, 2nd Illinois Light Artillery to disperse a force of 700 Confederates that occupied Clarksville. The 11th Illinois also went on an expedition to Hopkinsville, Kentucky, from 31 October to 13 November. The regiment served in the District of Jackson in July and the District of Cairo from August to November.

=== 1863 ===
The 11th Illinois was attached to the 2nd Brigade, 6th Division, Left Wing XIII Corps, Army of the Tennessee in November–December 1862. The same brigade and division transferred first to the XVI Corps in December 1862 – January 1863, and then to the XVII Corps from January to September 1863. On 20–24 November 1862, the regiment moved to La Grange, Tennessee, where it joined the 6th Division under Brigadier General John McArthur. The unit participated in Grant's abortive Northern Mississippi campaign through 12 January 1863. The 11th Illinois first marched to Tallahatchie where it engaged in a skirmish, then to Abbeville, and finally to Oxford. On the return march to Memphis, Tennessee, the regiment went via Holly Springs, Mississippi, and Moscow, Tennessee. On 17 January, the unit embarked on river transports at Memphis and traveled to Young's Point, which it reached on 24 January.

On 11 February, the 11th Illinois moved to Lake Providence, Louisiana, where it remained until 20 April. While there, the regiment went on an expedition to American Bend on 17–28 March. On 23 April, 589 enlisted men transferred into the 11th Illinois from the 109th Illinois Infantry Regiment. From 26 April to 18 May, the regiment marched to join the Siege of Vicksburg, moving through Richmond, Louisiana, Perkins' Landing, Grand Gulf, Mississippi, and Raymond, Mississippi. The unit participated in the 19 May and 22 May assaults. At Vicksburg, the 11th Illinois was assigned to Ransom's 2nd Brigade, McArthur's 6th Division, Major General James B. McPherson's XVII Corps, Grant's Army of the Tennessee. Vicksburg fell on 4 July; during the siege, 11th Illinois lost 3 officers wounded and 40 men killed and wounded. In addition, Colonel Nevius was killed leading the 22 May assault. The regiment moved to Natchez, Mississippi, on 17 July, and subsequently participated in an expedition to Woodville, Mississippi. On 12 October the unit returned to Vicksburg where it was on duty until 29 July 1864. From September 1863 to August 1864, the regiment was assigned to the 2nd Brigade, 1st Division, XVII Corps.

=== 1864–1865 ===
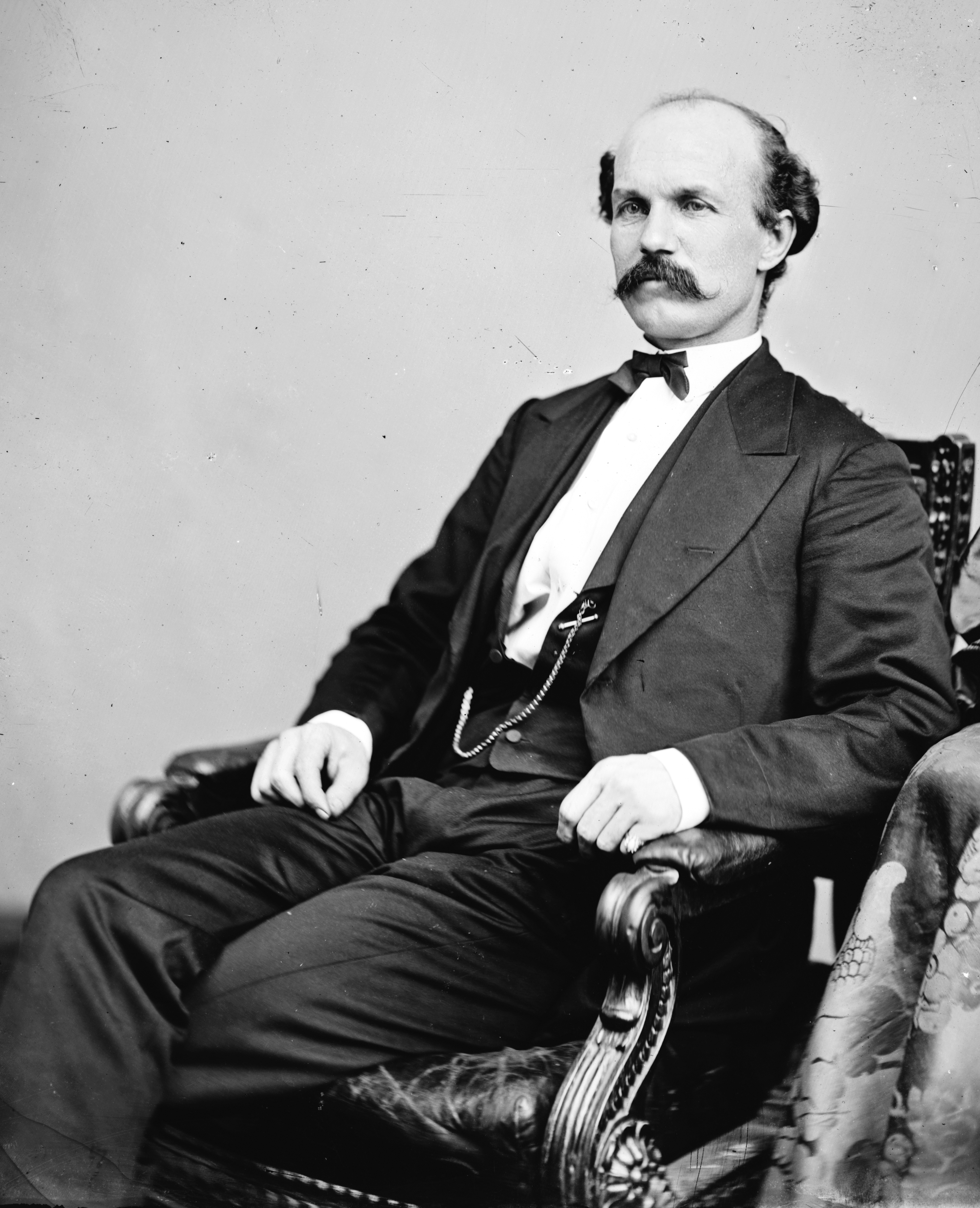
George C. McKee

From 1 February to 8 March 1864, the 11th Illinois participated in an expedition up the Yazoo River to Greenwood, Mississippi. On 5 February there was fighting at Liverpool Heights where the regiment lost 4 killed and 9 wounded. In the Battle of Yazoo City on 5 March, the unit sustained losses of 1 officer and 8 enlisted men killed, 24 wounded, and 12 missing. Under the overall leadership of Colonel Coates, the expedition consisted of 21 officers and 539 enlisted men from the 11th Illinois and 17 officers and 370 men from 8th Louisiana Infantry Regiment (African) aboard river transports. The force was accompanied by five gunboats under Captain Elias K. Owen and later joined by 250 troopers from the 1st Mississippi Cavalry Regiment (African). Yazoo City was occupied on 9 February and Greenwood on 14 February. After returning to Yazoo City, Coates' force was attacked by two brigades of Confederate cavalry on 5 March. The attackers surrounded nine companies of the 11th Illinois under Major McKee and 80 men of the 1st Mississippi in rifle pits outside the town, while forcing their way into the streets. Brigadier General Lawrence Sullivan Ross tried three times to bluff McKee into surrendering, but that officer refused to capitulate. After four hours, Coates attacked from the town with Company A of the 11th Illinois and six companies of the 8th Louisiana and compelled the Confederates to withdraw.

The 11th Illinois guarded the Big Black River bridge on 6–28 April. The regiment joined the Yazoo City expedition on 4–21 May. The expedition moved from Vicksburg to Yazoo City, Benton, and Vaughan Station while fighting in three skirmishes. On 1–7 July, the regiment was part of Major General Henry Warner Slocum's expedition to Jackson, Mississippi, where it fought in three actions. On 29 July, the unit moved to Morganza, Louisiana where it stayed until 3 September. From this time until December 1864, the 11th Illinois was part of the 1st Brigade, 2nd Division, XIX Corps, Army of the Gulf. While posted in Morganza, the regiment was sent on a number of expeditions. These were to Clinton, Louisiana, on 24–29 August, the mouth of the White River on 3 September, Memphis on 8 October, the White River again on 27 October, Gaines Landing on 6–7 November, and DeValls Bluff, Arkansas, on 8 November. The unit moved to Memphis on 30 November–4 December.

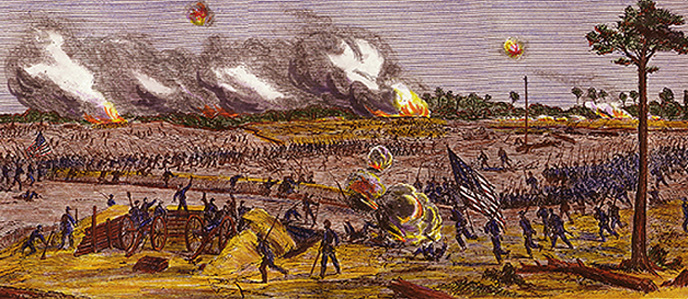
Battle of Fort Blakeley, 9 April 1865.

From December 1864 to February 1865, the 11th Illinois was attached to the 2nd Brigade, Reserve Division, Army of West Mississippi. In February, the 2nd Brigade was transferred to the 1st Division. From February to July 1865, the regiment was attached to the 2nd Brigade, 1st Division, XIII Corps, Army of West Mississippi. The regiment went on an expedition to Moscow, Tennessee, on 20–31 December. It moved first to Kenner, Louisiana, on 1–5 January 1865, then to Dauphin Island, Alabama, on 4–7 February. The regiment fought in the Mobile campaign from 17 February to 12 April. During the campaign, the 11th Illinois under Colonel Coates served in Brigadier General Elias Smith Dennis' 2nd Brigade, Brigadier General James C. Veatch's 1st Division, Major General Gordon Granger's XIII Corps, Major General Edward Canby's Army of West Mississippi. The 8th Illinois and 46th Illinois Infantry Regiments were the 2nd Brigade's other units. On 2 April, two Union divisions began to invest Fort Blakely, and on 3–4 April Canby reinforced them with two more divisions, including Veatch's. Fort Blakeley had 3,500 Confederate defenders and 33 guns under Brigadier General St. John Richardson Liddell. On 8 April, the Battle of Spanish Fort concluded when its Confederate garrison evacuated the fort. By this time, Union troops completed their third parallel within 600 yd (549 m) of Fort Blakeley. Each of the four Union division commanders made his own plan of attack. Veatch assigned Dennis' brigade to lead the attack with one regiment deployed as skirmishers and the other two forming the assault column. A second brigade was in support. The troops rapidly reached and overran Redoubt No. 5, capturing 300 prisoners and five cannons. In total, Veatch's division sustained losses of 13 killed and 64 wounded. In the Battle of Fort Blakeley on 9 April, Liddell's entire garrison was made prisoners.

On 12 April 1865, the 11th Illinois occupied Mobile, Alabama and performed garrison duty. On 27 May, the regiment boarded ship for New Orleans via Lake Pontchartrain. The unit moved to Alexandria, Louisiana, and left there on 22 June. The regiment was mustered out of service on 14 July at Baton Rouge, and traveled to Springfield, Illinois, for final payment and discharge. During service, the 11th Illinois lost 7 officers and 179 enlisted men killed or mortally wounded in action, and 1 officer and 284 enlisted men from disease. There were 471 fatalities. A total of 1,879 officers and men served with the regiment during its 3-year existence.

== See also ==
- List of Illinois Civil War Units
- Illinois in the American Civil War
