= Battle of Iuka order of battle =

The following units and commanders fought in the Battle of Iuka of the American Civil War. Order of battle compiled from the army organization, return of casualties and reports.

== Abbreviations used ==
=== Military rank ===
- MG = Major General
- BG = Brigadier General
- Col = Colonel

=== Other ===
- k = killed
- w = wounded

== Union ==
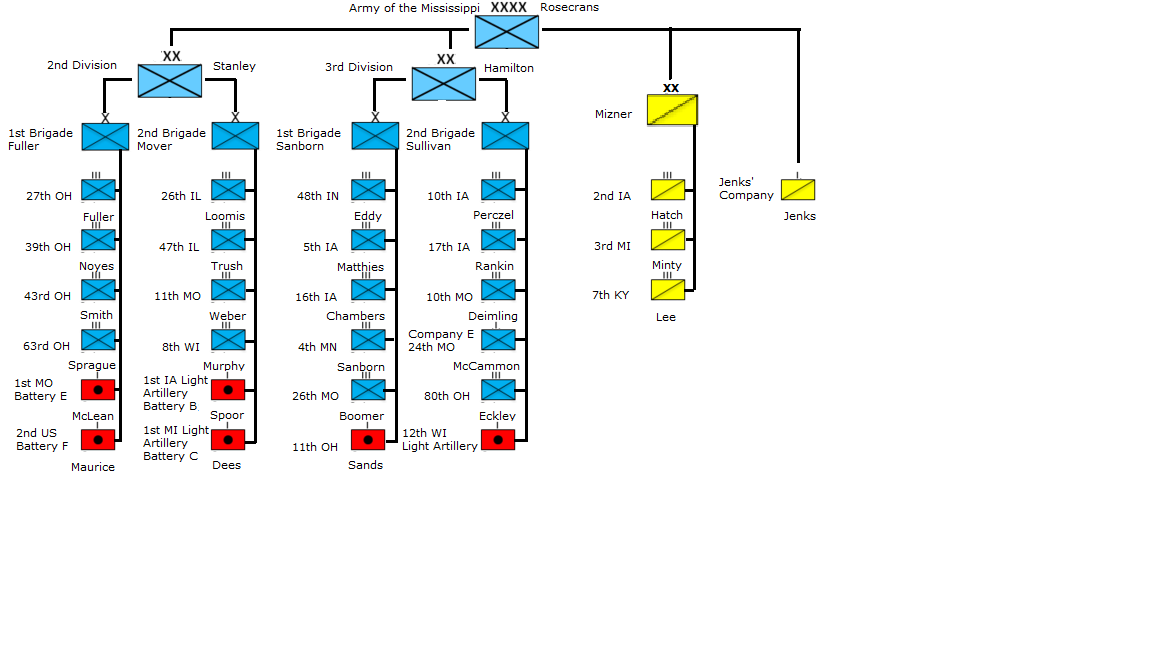
Union order of battle at Iuka

Army of the Mississippi
MG William S. Rosecrans

Division	Brigade	Regiments and Others
Second Division; BG David S. Stanley	1st Brigade Col John W. Fuller	27th Ohio: Maj Zephaniah S. Spaulding; 39th Ohio: Col Alfred W. Gilbert; 43rd Ohio: Col J. L. Kirby Smith; 63rd Ohio: Col John W. Sprague; 1st Missouri, Battery M: Cpt Albert M. Powell; 2nd United States, Battery F: Cpt Thomas D. Maurice
Second Division; BG David S. Stanley	2nd Brigade Col Joseph A. Mower	26th Illinois: Maj Robert A. Gillmore; 47th Illinois: Ltc William A. Thrush; 11th Missouri: Maj Andrew J. Weber; 8th Wisconsin: Ltc George W. Robbins; Iowa Light Artillery, 2nd Battery: Cpt Nelson T. Spoor; Michigan Light Artillery, 3rd Battery: Cpt Alexander W. Dees
Third Division; BG Charles S. Hamilton	1st Brigade Col John B. Sanborn	48th Indiana: Col Norman Eddy (w); 5th Iowa: Col Charles L. Matthies; 16th Iowa: Col Alexander Chambers; 4th Minnesota: Cpt Ebenezer LeGro; 26th Missouri: Col George B. Boomer; Ohio Light Artillery, 11th Battery: Lt Cyrus Sears (w)
Third Division; BG Charles S. Hamilton	2nd Brigade BG Jeremiah C. Sullivan	10th Iowa: Col Nicholas Perczel; 17th Iowa: Col John W. Rankin; 10th Missouri: Col Samuel A. Holmes; 80th Ohio: Ltc H. M. Bartilson; Wisconsin Light Artillery, 12th Battery: Lt Lorenzo D. Immell
Cavalry Division Col John K. Mizner		2nd Iowa Cavalry: Col Edward Hatch; 3rd Michigan Cavalry: Cpt Lyman Wilcox; 7th Kansas Cavalry, Companies B and E: Cpt Frederick Swoyer
	Unattached	Jenks's Company, Illinois Cavalry: Cpt Albert Jenks; Western Sharpshooters-14th Missouri Volunteers, Companies D, F and K: Cpt Michael Piggot

== Confederate ==
Army of the West
MG Sterling Price

Division	Brigade	Regiments and Others
First Division; BG Henry Little (k); BG Louis Hébert	1st Brigade Col Elijah Gates	16th Arkansas; 2nd Missouri; 3rd Missouri; 1st Missouri Dismounted Cavalry; Wade's (Missouri) Battery
First Division; BG Henry Little (k); BG Louis Hébert	2nd Brigade BG Louis Hébert	14th Arkansas; 17th Arkansas; 3rd Louisiana; 40th Mississippi; 1st Texas Legion; 3rd Texas Dismounted Cavalry; Dawson's St. Louis Battery; Clark Missouri Battery
First Division; BG Henry Little (k); BG Louis Hébert	3rd Brigade BG Martin E. Green	43rd Mississippi; 7th Mississippi Battalion; 4th Missouri; 6th Missouri; 3rd Missouri Dismounted Cavalry; Guibor's (Missouri) Battery; Landis's (Missouri) Battery
First Division; BG Henry Little (k); BG Louis Hébert	4th Brigade Col John D. Martin	37th Alabama; 36th Mississippi; 37th Mississippi; 38th Mississippi
	Cavalry BG Frank C. Armstrong	2nd Arkansas Cavalry; 2nd Missouri Cavalry; Wirt Adams' Cavalry Regiment; 2nd Mississippi Cavalry Regiment; 1st Mississippi Partisan Rangers
