= 17th Wisconsin Infantry Regiment =

Union Army infantry regiment

- Flag of Wisconsin
- Active: March 15, 1862 – July 14, 1865
- Country: United States
- Allegiance: Union
- Branch: Union Army
- Role: Infantry
- Size: Regiment
- Nickname: Irish Brigade
- Engagements: American Civil War: Siege of Corinth; Second Battle of Corinth; Vicksburg Campaign; Siege of Vicksburg; Atlanta campaign; Battle of Kennesaw Mountain; Battle of Atlanta; Savannah Campaign; Carolinas campaign; Battle of Rivers' Bridge; Battle of Bentonville

Commanders
- Colonel: John L. Doran
- Colonel: Adam Gale Malloy
- Lt. Col.: Thomas B. MacMahon
- Lt. Col.: Donald D. Scott
- Major: Patrick H. McCauley

The 17th Wisconsin Infantry Regiment was an infantry regiment that served in the Union Army during the American Civil War. It was popularly known as the Irish Brigade, due to its composition of mostly Irish American immigrants.

== Establishment ==
The 17th Wisconsin Infantry was organized under the authority granted by the July 22, 1861, act of Congress approving the enrollment of 500,000 volunteers for service in the American Civil War.

In October 1861, Governor Alexander Randall appointed John L. Doran colonel of the 17th Wisconsin Infantry Regiment, and tasked him with organizing the new regiment. From its inception, the 17th Wisconsin Infantry was recruited principally from the Irish population of the state.

Recruiting continued through the Winter and the regiment was collected and drilled at Camp Randall in Madison, Wisconsin. They mustered into federal service under Colonel Doran on March 15, 1862, and left the state for Saint Louis, Missouri, on March 23.

== Service ==
=== Operations around Corinth (Spring 1862 – Fall 1862) ===
The regiment proceeded from Saint Louis, on April 10, up the Tennessee River to Pittsburg Landing, Tennessee, where they were assigned to the 6th division of the Army of the Tennessee and moved with the army to invest the Siege of Corinth. During the siege, Colonel Dornan was placed in command of the brigade—which also comprised the 16th Wisconsin, 21st Missouri, and 25th Missouri infantry regiments—but was replaced on May 24 by Brigadier General John McArthur.

The Union Army took control of the town on May 29, but the 17th Wisconsin suffered significantly from diseases during the siege. The regiment remained camped south of Corinth through the summer and was then engaged in defense of railroad and logistics in the area. Company A was detached from the regiment and posted several miles out on the Mobile and Ohio Railroad and would not rejoin the regiment until November.

Around October 1, Company A, under Captain McCauley, engaged in a skirmish with Confederate cavalry north of Corinth while guarding the Mobile and Ohio Railroad. Company A suffered thirteen killed or wounded, but managed to drive off the Confederate regiment and captured a number of horses.

On the morning of the first day of the Second Battle of Corinth, October 3, 1862, the brigade of the 17th Wisconsin Infantry was placed on the Chewalla Road north of Corinth on the left end of the Union line. In the late morning, the Union line was being driven back, but a counterattack was ordered. As the Confederates attempted to outflank the counterattack, Colonel Doran led the 17th Wisconsin Infantry in a valiant charge on the Confederate lines and drove back the enemy regiments. They then fell back with their division to defensive lines nearer to Corinth. On the second day of battle, the 17th Wisconsin was engaged in the defense of an artillery battery and did not see significant fighting. The actions of the 17th Wisconsin and their commander on October 3 were highly complimented in the accounts of the battle written by generals Thomas J. McKean and John McArthur. (Note: United States War Record Office, Series 1, v. 17:1, p. 337; The Seventeenth Wisconsin, under the brave Colonel Doran, occupied a conspicuous position in this part of the day's work. —Thos. J. McKean, Brigadier-General, U.S. Volunteers) (Note: United States War Record Office, Series 1, v. 17:1, p. 344; The Seventeenth Wisconsin on the right, Colonel Doran commanding, moved forward, gallantly charging with an impetuosity truly characteristic... —John McArthur, Brig. Gen., Comdg. Sixth Division, Army of the Tennessee) In the battle, the 17th Wisconsin Infantry suffered five killed and 20 wounded.

=== Vicksburg campaign (Winter 1862 – Summer 1863) ===
Grant's Vicksburg campaign launched in November 1862, and the 17th Wisconsin Infantry was transferred to the 2nd brigade, commanded by Col. Gabriel Bouck.

On November 25, however, Colonel Doran resigned and was placed under arrest by General John McArthur. Lt. Colonel Adam Gale Malloy was promoted to colonel and led the regiment through most of the rest of the war.

Under Malloy's command, the regiment arrived in the vicinity of Vicksburg in January 1863, and were assigned to the digging of a canal to bypass Confederate defenses around Vicksburg. They remained until April 20, when they were sent further south, below Vicksburg. They were attached to the XVII Corps, commanded by General James B. McPherson, and proceeded to Raymond, Mississippi, arriving on May 16. Here they received word of the Battle of Champion Hill and were ordered to rush to the battle site, but did not arrive until the battle was over.

From there, they turned back to the Siege of Vicksburg and secured a position southeast of the city. On May 19, 1863, they were in the vanguard of the assault against the Confederate fortifications and managed to capture a portion of the enemy trenches. The rest of their brigade, however, did not receive the signal to attack—left without support, the 17th Wisconsin was forced to withdraw. On the second attempted assault, May 22, the 17th Wisconsin was held in reserve, due to their severe losses on the first assault.

After the failure of the second assault, Grant settled in for a protracted siege and maintained the encirclement until Vicksburg surrendered on July 4, 1863. The brigade of the 17th Wisconsin, then led by General Thomas E. G. Ransom, was given the honor of being the first to enter the city, due to their performance in the siege. In the Vicksburg campaign, the 17th Wisconsin Infantry suffered 14 killed and 50 wounded.

=== Operations West of the Mississippi (Fall 1863) ===
A few days after the capture of Vicksburg, the 17th Wisconsin and its brigade moved south to Natchez, Mississippi. There on August 24, they were supplied with horses and employed as mounted infantry. In September, Colonel Malloy led 300 men of the 17th Wisconsin across the Mississippi River to Trinity, Louisiana, routing Confederate defenders and destroyed a Confederate steamboat—the Rinaldo—carrying supplies. After being joined by the rest of the brigade, Malloy and the 17th Wisconsin were again sent forward and occupied the town of Trinity, then went forward again and routed more Confederate defenders, pursued them for nine miles, and captured several prisoners. During this campaign, the 17th Wisconsin suffered one killed and four wounded.

On September 4, they approached Fort Beauregard, a fortified earthwork designed to defend approaches to Harrisonburg, Louisiana. The Confederate defenders fled and abandoned the fort and its guns, and the 17th Wisconsin Infantry captured and destroyed several cannons and ammunition. After this success, they went on to destroy a grist mill and a large store of cotton and food supplies, then returned to with the brigade to Natchez. Colonel Malloy's account of the Natchez expedition can be found in the Official War Records, Series 1, Volume 26, Part 1.

In October, the brigade returned to Vicksburg for Winter.

=== Atlanta campaign (Spring – Summer 1864) ===
Seven-eighths of the regiment re-enlisted in January 1864, qualifying the 17th Wisconsin Infantry as a veteran regiment. The veterans were given furlough in March to return to Wisconsin, where they paraded through Madison and were honored by Governor James T. Lewis, Secretary of State (General) Lucius Fairchild, and Mayor William T. Leitch.

The regiment reassembled on April 20, 1864, at Camp Washburn, Milwaukee, and went by rail to Cairo, Illinois. There they attached to XVII Corps, which was on its way to join General William T. Sherman in the Atlanta campaign. They traveled on the Tennessee River to Clifton, Tennessee, then marched to Huntsville, Alabama. At Huntsville, in May 1864, the 17th Wisconsin Infantry was assigned to the 3rd brigade, 3rd division, XVII Corps, and Colonel Malloy was designated brigade commander, leaving Lt. Colonel Thomas B. MacMahon in command of the regiment.

On June 5, the 17th Wisconsin, with its division, marched to join General Sherman, meeting him at Acworth, Georgia, on June 8, just after the Battle of Dallas. Their division was placed on the far left end of the Union line, near Big Shanty, on June 10, and engaged in heavy skirmishing until June 19, when they advanced to Brush Mountain, suffering two killed and six wounded.

At the Battle of Kennesaw Mountain, where the Confederate army of Joseph E. Johnston had set its defenses, the 17th Wisconsin and its division were again on the far left of the Union line. They were part of the demonstration against the Confederate right, designed to convince the enemy to spread out their defenses. The 17th Wisconsin succeeded in taking two lines of Confederate trenches, but came under fire from three Confederate batteries; they held the ground for three hours but were forced to withdraw. They suffered 2 killed and 11 wounded here. After several days of stalemate, in which they suffered an additional 1 killed and 3 wounded, on July 2, the 17th Wisconsin, with its corps, was assigned to the flanking maneuver which went around the south end of the Confederate line and forced Johnston to evacuate his position.

They crossed the Chattahoochee River with their division on July 17, and marched around the north of Atlanta, arriving at Decatur, Georgia, on July 20. The division then marched west toward Atlanta, and seized a Confederate position on Bald Hill on July 21, while the 17th Wisconsin was in reserve. The 17th Wisconsin and its brigade then joined their division and fortified the hill, which was near the center of the Union line. As the Union left fell back after skirmishes that day, Bald Hill was near the pivot of the L-shaped Union line in the Battle of Atlanta, July 22. During the battle, the hill came under assault from Carter L. Stevenson's division, but the division held their ground. The 17th Wisconsin suffered 4 killed and 11 wounded.

On August 24, Lieutenant Colonel MacMahon was discharged, and Major Donald D. Scott was promoted to lieutenant colonel, taking over as the acting commander of the 17th Wisconsin Infantry.

The 17th Wisconsin, with XVII Corps, maintained the siege of Atlanta until August 26, when they moved to the south of the city to cut the last remaining supply lines for the Confederate defenders. XVII Corps was in reserve during the Battle of Jonesboro, but after the Confederate evacuation of Atlanta, the 17th Wisconsin engaged in skirmishing around Lovejoy Station, suffering 11 killed.

=== Savannah and the Carolinas (Fall 1864 – Spring 1865) ===
The 17th Wisconsin briefly participated in pursuit of the Confederate army after they abandoned Atlanta, but returned to Marietta, then camped in that area with XVII Corps until November 16, when General Sherman began his famous march to the sea (Savannah campaign). The 17th Wisconsin went with the column along the southern route to Savannah, Georgia, and did not engage in fighting during the march. Their commanders, Colonel Malloy and Lt. Colonel Scott, were on furlough when the march began and while on their way back, they were diverted to command a provisional brigade through other operations in Tennessee and Alabama. They did not rejoin the army until their provisional division merged back with Sherman's army at Goldsboro, North Carolina, on March 23, 1865.

The 17th Wisconsin, meanwhile, was under the command of Major Patrick H. McCauley, and continued with Sherman in his Campaign of the Carolinas, leaving Savannah in January 1865. They camped near Beaufort, South Carolina, then marched with their Corps to the vicinity of Columbia, South Carolina. At the Battle of Rivers' Bridge, their brigade was part of the rapid crossing which forced the enemy to evacuate their defensive position. They then held the bridge until the remainder of their force could arrive and cross.

They proceeded to North Carolina, arriving at Goldsboro on March 23. There, Colonel Malloy resumed command of the 17th Wisconsin Infantry. They joined the march to Raleigh, North Carolina. While there, they received word of the surrender of Confederate general Joseph E. Johnston's army and Robert E. Lee's surrender to Grant in Virginia around the same time; the war was effectively over. They marched to the Confederate capitol, Richmond, Virginia, then proceeded to Washington, D.C., where they participated in the Grand Review of the Armies.

The regiment was sent to Louisville, Kentucky, and mustered out. Then returned to Madison, Wisconsin, on July 17, where the regiment was paid and disbanded.

For meritorious services during the war, Col. Malloy was brevetted Brigadier General.

== Casualties ==
The 17th Wisconsin Infantry suffered 41 men killed in action or died of wounds, plus another 220 who died of disease, and 14 who died in accidents, for a total of 275 fatalities.

== Commanders ==
- Colonel John L. Doran (October 25, 1891 – November 25, 1862) was an attorney and militia volunteer captain before the war. He was tasked with recruiting and organizing the 17th Wisconsin Infantry, and led the regiment until forced to resign in November 1862.
- Colonel Adam Gale Malloy (November 25, 1862 – July 14, 1865) began the war as captain of Co. A in the 6th Wisconsin Infantry Regiment. He joined the 17th Wisconsin as lieutenant colonel when it was organized and operated for much of the war as brigade commander, receiving an honorary brevet to brigadier general after the end of the war.
  - Lt. Colonel Thomas B. MacMahon (April 1864 – August 24, 1864) acted as commander of the regiment while Colonel Malloy was commanding the brigade. Discharged in August 1864.
  - Lt. Colonel Donald D. Scott (August 24, 1864 – November 1864) acted as commander of the regiment while Colonel Malloy was commanding the brigade.
  - Major Patrick H. McCauley (November 1864 – March 23, 1865) acted as commander of the regiment while Colonel Malloy and Lt. Colonel Scott were on furlough.

== See also ==
- List of Wisconsin Civil War units
- Wisconsin in the American Civil War
