= John L. Doran =

American politician (c. 1815–1887)

Member of the Wisconsin State Assembly from the Milwaukee 3rd district
- In office January 6, 1851 – January 5, 1852
- Preceded by: Edward McGarry
- Succeeded by: Wallace W. Graham

Personal details
- Born: c. 1815 County Mayo, Ireland, UK
- Died: January 21, 1887 (aged 71–72) Chicago, Illinois, U.S.
- Resting place: Calvary Cemetery, Evanston, Illinois
- Party: Democratic
- Spouse: Ellen O'Meara (died 1920)

Military service
- Allegiance: United States
- Branch/service: United States Volunteers; Union Army
- Years of service: 1861–1862
- Rank: Colonel, USV
- Commands: 17th Reg. Wis. Vol. Infantry
- Battles/wars: American Civil War: Siege of Corinth; Second Battle of Corinth

John L. Doran (c. 1815 – January 21, 1887) was an Irish American immigrant, lawyer, and Union Army officer in the American Civil War. He also served one term in the Wisconsin State Assembly, representing the old 3rd ward of the city of Milwaukee in the 4th Wisconsin Legislature (1851), and was a delegate to Wisconsin's second constitutional convention, which drafted the Constitution of Wisconsin in 1848.

== Early career ==
John Doran was born in Ireland in about 1815 and became a practicing attorney before emigrating to the United States. He settled at Milwaukee, Wisconsin Territory, sometime before 1847 and resumed his law practice.

Politically, he became associated with the Democratic Party. He was elected city attorney of Milwaukee in 1847 and served as a delegate from Milwaukee County to the state's second constitutional convention, which produced the Constitution of Wisconsin. In 1850, he was elected to the Wisconsin State Assembly, representing the 3rd ward of the city of Milwaukee.

== Civil War service ==
In the run-up to the American Civil War, Doran became the leader of a Milwaukee-based company of Wisconsin militia volunteers known as the "Montgomery Guards". After President Lincoln's call for volunteers, the Montgomery Guards were enrolled in the 6th Wisconsin Infantry Regiment, but Doran was instead appointed colonel of the 17th Wisconsin Infantry Regiment and tasked with recruiting and organizing that regiment.

The 17th Wisconsin Infantry, from its inception, was designated the "Irish Brigade" and recruited primarily from the Irish American population in Wisconsin. Doran led the regiment for a year, through the Siege of Corinth and the Second Battle of Corinth, in which the regiment and Colonel Doran received praise for gallantry. (Note: United States War Record Office, Series 1, v. 17:1, p. 337; The Seventeenth Wisconsin, under the brave Colonel Doran, occupied a conspicuous position in this part of the day's work. —Thos. J. McKean, Brigadier-General, U.S. Volunteers) However, that Winter, Colonel Doran was compelled to resign and was placed under arrest by General John McArthur.

== Postbellum years ==
Following his resignation, Doran moved to Chicago and resumed his legal career. He died at his home in Chicago on January 21, 1887.

== Notes ==
Military offices
Regiment established	Command of the 17th Wisconsin Infantry Regiment; October 25, 1891 – November 25, 1862	Succeeded by Col. Adam Gale Malloy
Wisconsin State Assembly
Preceded by Edward McGarry	Member of the Wisconsin State Assembly from the Milwaukee 3rd district January 6, 1851 – January 5, 1852	Succeeded by Wallace W. Graham
