= Adam Gale Malloy =

Union Army officer in the American Civil War

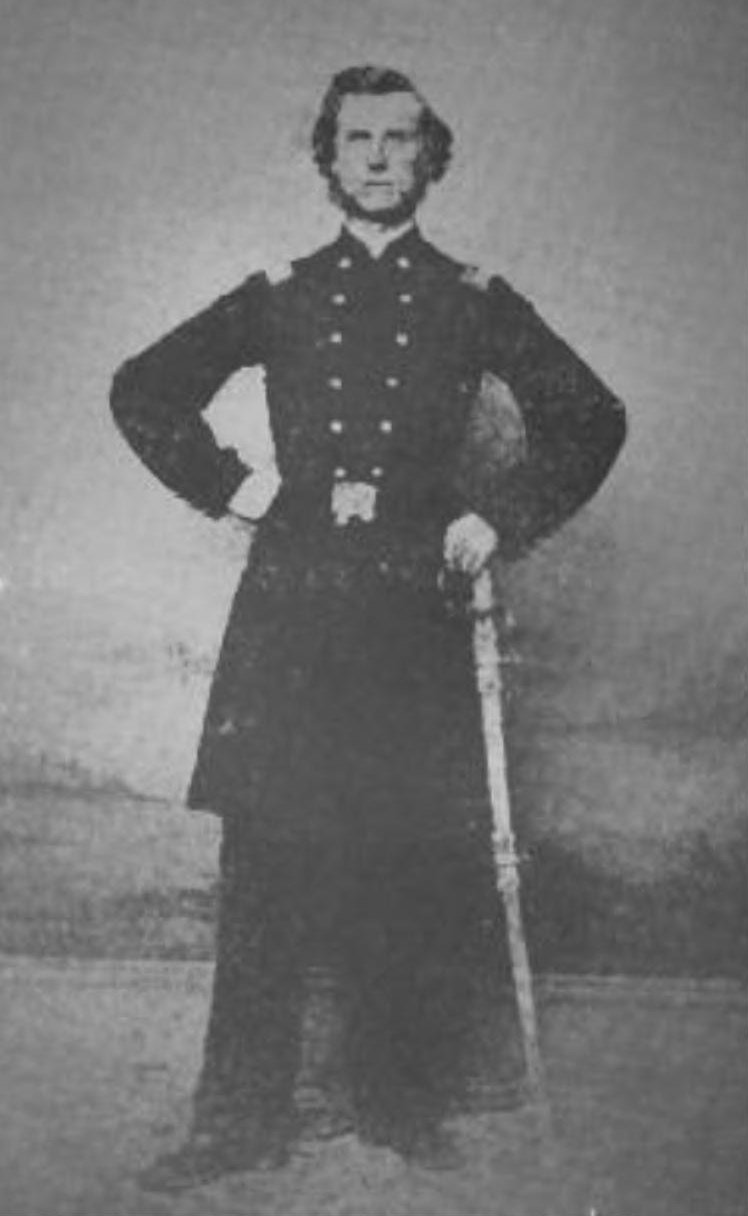
- Photo from A Standard History of Sauk County (Vol. 1)
- Born: September 10, 1830; County Tipperary, Ireland, U.K.
- Died: November 10, 1911 (aged 81) Escondido, California, U.S.
- Buried: San Marcos Cemetery, San Marcos, California
- Allegiance: United States
- Branch: United States Army; Union Army
- Service years: 1846–1848 (USA); 1862–1865 (USV); 1865–1870 (USA)
- Rank: Colonel, USV; Brevet Brig. General, USV; 1st Lieutenant, USA; Brevet Colonel, USA
- Commands: 17th Reg. Wis. Vol. Infantry; 3rd Bde., 3rd Div., XVII Corps
- Conflicts: Mexican–American War: Texas Campaign; Battle of Palo Alto; Battle of Resaca de la Palma; Mexico City Campaign; Siege of Veracruz; Battle of Cerro Gordo; Battle of Churubusco; Battle of Molino del Rey; Battle of Chapultepec; Battle for Mexico City; American Civil War: Siege of Corinth (Lt.C., 17th Wis.); Second Battle of Corinth; Vicksburg Campaign (Col., in command, 17th Wis.); Siege of Vicksburg; Atlanta campaign (Col., in command, 3rd Bde., 3rd Div., XVII Corps); Battle of Kennesaw Mountain; Battle of Atlanta; Franklin–Nashville campaign (Col., in command, 2nd Bde., Provisional Div., Provisional Detachment, Army of the Tennessee); Battle of Nashville; Carolinas campaign (Col., in command, 1st Bde., 2nd Div., Provisional Corps); Battle of Wyse Fork
- Children: Eva (Bloom); (b. 1856; died 1908)

Adam Gale Malloy (September 10, 1830 – November 10, 1911) was an Irish American immigrant and Republican politician who served as a Union Army officer during the American Civil War. After the war, he was given an honorary brevet to brigadier general. He was an unsuccessful candidate for the United States House of Representatives from Texas in 1892.

== Early life ==
Malloy was born on September 10, 1830, in County Tipperary, Ireland, then under the rule of the United Kingdom. He emigrated to the United States with his parents when he was still an infant.

When he was 14, his father volunteered for service with the 4th U.S. Infantry Regiment, and Adam joined the regiment as a fifer (musician). At the outbreak of the Mexican–American War, the 4th U.S. Infantry was sent into battle in the Texas Campaign. Malloy's father was killed at the Battle of Resaca de la Palma, and during that battle Malloy took up a musket and became a combatant. He served through the remainder of the war and fought in the Battle for Mexico City.

After the war, Malloy settled at Baraboo, Wisconsin, and worked in indian affairs.

== Civil War service ==
In the years leading up to the American Civil War, Malloy became active with the Wisconsin militia and helped to drill Sauk County volunteers in Baraboo, Wisconsin. At the outbreak of the war, Malloy's trainees became part of the "Madison Guards" militia company which joined the 1st Wisconsin Infantry Regiment. Malloy remained in Baraboo to organize a full company from the surrounding area and was elected captain of that company. Malloy led his company to Camp Randall, in Madison, where they were enrolled as Company A of the 6th Wisconsin Infantry Regiment.

The 6th Wisconsin mustered into service July 16, 1861, and proceeded to Washington, D.C. They spent the Fall building fortifications around Washington and guarding railroad bridges.

=== Irish brigade (Spring 1862 – Winter 1864) ===
That December, Malloy was promoted to lieutenant colonel for the newly organized 17th Wisconsin Infantry Regiment—the "Irish Brigade". The 17th Wisconsin was organized at Camp Randall and mustered into service in March 1862. With the 17th Wisconsin, Malloy moved to the western theater of the war and participated in the sieges of Corinth and Vicksburg in Mississippi. Before Vicksburg, in November 1862, Malloy was promoted to colonel of the regiment, following the resignation of Colonel John L. Doran.

Malloy and the 17th Wisconsin re-enlisted as a veteran regiment in January 1864, earning a month-long furlough in Wisconsin. Upon their return, they joined General William Tecumseh Sherman's Atlanta campaign. They were attached to XVII Army Corps at Huntsville, Alabama, and were organized into the 3rd brigade of the 3rd division of the corps. Malloy was placed in command of the brigade, which also included a battalion of men detached from the 14th Wisconsin, 81st Illinois, and 95th Illinois infantry regiments.

Malloy led his brigade through the battles of Kennesaw Mountain, Atlanta, and Jonesboro. After which, the 17th Wisconsin was camped near Atlanta into the Fall of 1864.

=== Provisional division (Spring 1865) ===
While the regiment was camped at Atlanta, Malloy was one of several veterans granted furlough—he returned to Wisconsin for several weeks. During this furlough, General Sherman launched his march to the sea (Savannah Campaign). Those on furlough were given directions to report to Chattanooga, Tennessee, on their return. At Chattanooga, a provisional division was organized of these returning veterans and new recruits, and Malloy was placed in command of a brigade composed of the men who were ultimately bound for regiments in XVII Corps. Malloy's brigade was ordered to guard duty in the Tunnel Hill and Ringgold region, but upon learning of Confederate general John Bell Hood's disposition to attack Nashville, Tennessee, they rode by rail back north to assist in the defense of that city in the Battle of Nashville.

After some additional work in Alabama, the provisional division was sent back to Baltimore, by way of Ohio, and took steamboats to Beaufort, North Carolina, arriving February 8, 1865. They then went inland by rail to New Bern, North Carolina, then worked to repair the railroad further inland. In early March, they encountered Confederate forces under General Braxton Bragg entrenched on the rail line ahead of them and participated in the Battle of Wyse Fork, which ultimately cleared the way to Goldsboro, North Carolina, where Sherman's army met them on March 23, 1865. For his part in the Battle of Wyse Fork, Malloy received mention and compliments in the account of the division commander, General Samuel P. Carter. (Note: United States War Record Office, Series 1, v. 47:1, p. 995; While my thanks are due to all the officers of my command for the gallant manner in which they performed their duty during the attack and repulse of the enemy, I desire to make particular mention of Colonel Malloy, of Seventeenth Wisconsin Infantry, commanding First Brigade, and Lieutenant-Colonel Splaine, Seventeenth Massachusetts Infantry, commanding Third Brigade. They were cool, energetic, and prompt in the performance of their whole duty. It is hoped that they may be suitably rewarded for the valuable services they rendered in securing to our arms a decisive victory. —S. P. Carter, Brigadier General, Commanding Division) Colonel Malloy's own account of the battle can be found in the Official War Records, Series 1, Volume 47, Part 1, item 266.

=== Final months (Summer 1865) ===
After the reunion with Sherman's army, Malloy resumed command of the 17th Wisconsin Infantry for the remaining days of the war. They marched to Raleigh, North Carolina, and were camped there when they received word of the surrenders of the Confederate Army of Northern Virginia and the Army of Tennessee, effectively ending the war.

== Postbellum career ==
Malloy was mustered out of the volunteers on July 19, 1865. On January 13, 1866, President Andrew Johnson nominated Malloy for appointment to the grade of brevet brigadier general of volunteers to rank from March 13, 1865, and the United States Senate confirmed the appointment on March 12, 1866.

In February 1866, Malloy joined the regular army and was appointed a 1st lieutenant with the 17th U.S. Infantry Regiment. He was unassigned as of August 12, 1869. In recognition for his Civil War service, he was brevetted to captain (for Vicksburg), to major (for Kennesaw Mountain), to lieutenant colonel (for Atlanta), and to colonel (for Nashville).

Malloy resigned from the Army in August 1870, and accepted an appointment from the state government of Texas to aid in Reconstruction. In 1874, he received an appointment from President Ulysses S. Grant as collector of internal revenue for the 4th district of Texas, and, in 1880, President Rutherford B. Hayes appointed him collector of customs for the port of Galveston, Texas. He was subsequently re-appointed to this role by President Chester A. Arthur.

He was a Texas delegate to the Republican national conventions in 1872, 1876, 1880, 1884, and 1892, was a member of the Republican National Committee from 1880 to 1884, and was the Republican nominee for United States House of Representatives in Texas's 13th congressional district in 1892.

He moved to Los Angeles around 1901, and from there moved to San Diego, and then Escondido, California, where he died on November 10, 1911. He is buried in San Marcos, California.

== See also ==
- List of American Civil War brevet generals (Union)

== Notes ==
Military offices
Preceded by Col. John L. Doran	Command of the 17th Wisconsin Infantry Regiment; November 25, 1862 – July 14, 1865	Regiment abolished
