= 1st Battalion, Mississippi Sharpshooters =

- Active: 1861–1865
- Disbanded: April 26, 1865
- Country: Confederate States
- Allegiance: Mississippi
- Branch: Confederate States Army
- Type: Infantry
- Size: Regiment/Battalion
- Battles: American Civil War: Battle of Shiloh; Second Battle of Corinth; Atlanta campaign; Franklin-Nashville Campaign; Carolinas campaign

Commanders
- Notable commanders: John Donelson Martin

The 1st Battalion, Mississippi Sharpshooters was a unit of the Confederate States Army from Mississippi during the American Civil War. Originally designated as the 1st Mississippi Valley Regiment and subsequently as the 25th Mississippi Infantry and 2nd Confederate Regiment, the unit was reorganized in May 1862 as a sharpshooter battalion, a designation it kept for the remainder of the war.

== Name ==
This unit was first designated as the 1st Mississippi Valley Regiment. It was then briefly renamed the 25th Mississippi Infantry, and then given the title of 2nd Confederate Infantry in January 1862. The name "25th Mississippi" was not reused by any other unit. The "2nd Confederate" designation was meant to indicate that the regiment contained companies from multiple states and was not a provisional unit raised by a single state, but rather one intended for regular Confederate States Army service, although this distinction was rarely used in practice and the vast majority of Confederate regiments carried state designations. Following the disbanding of the 2nd Confederate Regiment on May 8, 1862, the unit was reorganized and several Mississippi companies from the 2nd Confederate were redesignated as the 1st Battalion, Mississippi Sharpshooters.

== History ==
The original Mississippi Valley regiment was formed in the summer of 1861 from Mississippi and Arkansas troops who were sent to Kentucky under the command of Colonel John Donelson Martin, assigned to John S. Bowen's brigade. The regiment reported a total strength of 787 men in November 1861. After spending the winter at Camp Beauregard, the regiment fought at the Battle of Shiloh in April, 1862, taking 100 casualties. Col. Martin was promoted to brigadier general following the battle, and the regiment was disbanded on May 8 as the men's initial one-year terms of service were expiring. General Martin was later killed at the Second Battle of Corinth in October, 1862.

The three Mississippi companies of the regiment, along with a separate company called "Caruthers' Sharpshooters" were reorganized as the 1st Battalion Mississippi Sharpshooters. Caruthers' Sharpshooters independently took part in the Second Battle of Corinth and the Battle of Baton Rouge as part of General John S. Bowen's brigade.

In the Civil War, sharpshooter units often served as dispersed skirmishers, positioned ahead of the main lines and tasked with eliminating enemy scouts, officers, and artillery crews, performing some tasks associated with modern snipers. Following the success of Union sharpshooter units, the Confederate Congress passed a resolution on April 21, 1862, ordering that sharpshooter battalions be organized from existing units. Sharpshooter battalions consisted of 3-6 companies attached to their parent brigade, with men selected for their marksmanship skill. The latest precision weapons and telescopic sights were rare in the Confederacy, but the Sharps rifle, the short model Enfield, and the imported British Whitworth rifle were popular with Confederate sharpshooters due to their long-distance accuracy.

During the Atlanta campaign, the 1st Battalion saw combat in numerous battles as part of General Winfield S. Featherston's brigade, fighting at Resaca, New Hope Church, and Peachtree Creek. Casualties at Peachtree Creek included 32 killed, wounded, and missing.

In General John Bell Hood's subsequent Tennessee Campaign, the battalion fought at Battle of Franklin and Nashville. Following these severe Confederate defeats, after a retreat back to Mississippi in December only 63 men were left in the battalion. During the Carolinas campaign, the diminished battalion took part in some of the final battles of the war before surrendering in April, 1865.

== Commanders ==
Commanders of the 1st Mississippi Valley/25th Mississippi/2nd Confederate Regiment:

- Col. John D. Martin
- Lt. Col. Edward F. McGehee, wounded at Shiloh, resigned 1863.

Commanders of the 1st Mississippi Sharpshooters:

- Maj. James M. Stigler

== Organization ==
Companies of the 1st Mississippi Valley/25th Mississippi/2nd Confederate Regiment:

- Company A, "Red Rebels" of Holmes County.
- Company B, "Jackson Hornets" of Mississippi and Alabama.
- Company G, "Osceola Hornets" of Arkansas, later joined the 9th Arkansas Infantry Regiment.
- Company I, "Como Avengers"

Companies of the 1st Battalion, Mississippi Sharpshooters:

- Company A
- Company B, "Red Rebels"
- Company C
- Company D

== See also ==
- List of Mississippi Civil War Confederate units
