= 11th Ohio Independent Light Artillery Battery =

11th Ohio Battery
- Active: October 27, 1861, to November 5, 1864
- Country: United States
- Allegiance: Union
- Branch: Artillery
- Equipment: 2 12-pdr howitzers, 2 6-pdr smoothbores, 2 12-pdr James rifles
- Engagements: Battle of Island Number Ten; Siege of Corinth; Battle of Iuka; Second Battle of Corinth; Battle of Raymond; Battle of Jackson; Battle of Champion Hill; Siege of Vicksburg, May 19 & May 22 assaults

The 11th Ohio Battery was an artillery battery that served in the Union Army during the American Civil War.

== Service ==
The 11th Ohio Battery was organized in St. Louis, Missouri October 27, 1861, and mustered in for a three-year enlistment under Captain Archibald G. A. Constable.

The battery was attached to Army of the West and Department of the Missouri to March 1862. Artillery, 2nd Division, Army of the Mississippi, to April 1862. Artillery, 3rd Division, Army of the Mississippi, to November 1862. 7th Division, Left Wing, XIII Corps, Department of the Tennessee, to December 1862. Artillery, 7th Division, XVI Corps, to January 1863. Artillery, 7th Division, XVII Corps, to July 1863. Kimball's Division, Arkansas Expedition, to August 1863. 2nd Brigade, 2nd Division, Arkansas Expedition, to January 1864. Artillery, 2nd Division, VII Corps, Department of the Arkansas, to May 1864. Garrison, Pine Bluff, Arkansas, 2nd Division, VII Corps, to November 1864.

The 11th Ohio Battery mustered out of service at Camp Chase in Columbus, Ohio, on November 5, 1864.

== Detailed service ==
Moved to South Point, Mo., October 28, 1861. March to Syracuse, Mo., November 22, then to Tipton, Mo., November, 29, and duty there until December 15. Moved to Otterville, Mo., December 15, and duty there until February 2, 1862. March to Booneville, then to St. Charles, February 2–17. Siege of New Madrid, Mo., March 3–14. Siege and capture of Island No. 10, Mississippi River, March 15-April 8. Expedition to Fort Pillow, Tenn., April 13–17. Moved to Pittsburg Landing, Tenn., April 17–23. Advance on and siege of Corinth, Miss., April 29-May 30. Pursuit to Booneville May 30-June 13. Duty at Corinth until June 23. Expedition to Ripley June 27-July 2. At Corinth until August 4. At Jacinto until September 18. Battle of Iuka, Miss., September 19. Battle of Corinth October 3–4. Pursuit to Ripley October 5–12. Grant's Central Mississippi Campaign November–December. At Germantown, Tenn., until January 15, 1863. At Memphis, Tenn., until March. Yazoo Pass Expedition and operations against Fort Pemberton and Greenwood, March 11-April 5. Moved to Milliken's Bend, La. Movement on Bruinsburg and turning Grand Gulf April 25–30. Battle of Thompson's Hill. Port Gibson, May 1 (reserve). Battle of Raymond May 12. Jackson May 14. Battle of Champion Hill May 16. Siege of Vicksburg, Miss., May 18-July 4. Assaults on Vicksburg May 19 and 22. Ordered to Helena, Ark., July 28. Steele's Expedition to Little Rock, Ark., August 10-September 10. Bayou Fourche and capture of Little Rock September 10. Duty at Little Rock until April 1864, and at Pine Bluff until October. Ordered home for muster out.

== Casualties ==
The battery lost a total of 50 enlisted men during service; 20 enlisted men killed or mortally wounded, 30 enlisted men died due to disease.

== Commanders ==
- Captain Archibald G. A. Constable - resigned
- Captain Frank C. Sands
- Captain Fletcher E. Armstrong
- 1st Lieutenant Cyrus Sears

== Notable members ==
- 1st Lieutenant Cyrus Sears - Medal of Honor recipient for action at the Battle of Iuka

== See also ==
- List of Ohio Civil War units
- Ohio in the Civil War
