= J. H. Jones (Mississippi politician) =

American lawyer (1840–1911)

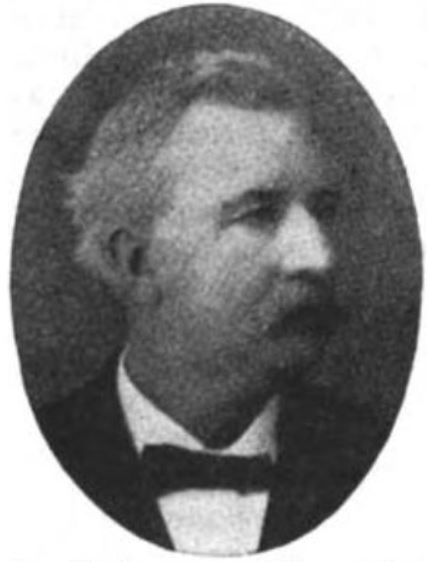
- c. 1907

13th Lieutenant Governor of Mississippi
- In office January 1896 – January 1900
- Governor: Anselm J. McLaurin
- Preceded by: M. M. Evans
- Succeeded by: James T. Harrison

Member of the Mississippi State Senate from the 37th district
- In office January 1890 – January 1896

Member of the Mississippi House of Representatives from the Wilkinson County district
- In office January 1886 – January 1890

Personal details
- Born: October 9, 1840 Autauga County, Alabama, U.S.
- Died: December 17, 1911 (aged 71) Woodville, Mississippi, U.S.
- Party: Democratic
- Children: 2

James Henry Jones (October 9, 1840 - December 17, 1911) was an American politician and lawyer. He served in both houses of the Mississippi Legislature and was the Lieutenant Governor of Mississippi from 1896 to 1900. He also was an officer in the Confederate States Army during the American Civil War.

== Early life ==
James Henry Jones was born on October 9, 1840, in Autauga County, Alabama. He was of French Huguenot ancestry. He was the son of John Edmund Jones, a lawyer and circuit court judge in Alabama, and his wife Mary (Mellard) Jones. Jones attended the University of Mississippi, graduating with a B. A. in 1858. After studying law, Jones moved to Texas and was admitted to the bar in 1859. After the American Civil War began in 1861, he returned to Mississippi and enlisted as a private in the Confederate States Army. In the winter of 1861, Jones was promoted to the rank of lieutenant. In April 1862, Jones returned to Wilkinson County, Mississippi, where he then raised what would become Company D of the 38th Mississippi Infantry Regiment. While fighting in the war, Jones was captured at the Siege of Vicksburg and then seriously wounded at the Battle of Tupelo. After returning from the war, Jones settled in Woodville, Mississippi, where he continued practicing law.

== Political career ==
Jones was elected to represent Wilkinson County as a Democrat in the Mississippi House of Representatives, and served in the 1886 and 1888 sessions. In 1890, Jones represented the 37th District in the Mississippi State Senate. He was also a delegate to the state's 1890 Constitutional Convention. Jones was re-elected to the Senate and served in that term from 1892 to 1896. In November 1895, Jones was elected to the office of Lieutenant Governor of Mississippi. He served for one term that lasted from January 1896 to January 1900. After his term ended, he retired from politics.

== Personal life ==
Jones was a member of the Methodist Episcopal Church, South. He was also a member of the Freemasons and of the United Confederate Veterans. He married Helen M. Davis, a resident of Wilkinson County, in 1858. They had two children: Mary A., who died aged 14; and William Edmund, who died aged 19. Jones died on December 17, 1911, at his home in Woodville, Mississippi.
