= 38th Mississippi Infantry Regiment =

- Active: 1862–1865
- Country: Confederate States
- Allegiance: Mississippi
- Branch: Army
- Type: Infantry (1862–1864); Mounted infantry (1864–1865)
- Size: Regiment
- Battles: American Civil War: Battle of Iuka; Second Battle of Corinth; Siege of Vicksburg; Battle of Tupelo

The 38th Mississippi Infantry Regiment, later redesignated as the 38th Mississippi Mounted Infantry, was a unit of the Confederate States Army during the American Civil War. The regiment fought in numerous battles across Mississippi as an infantry unit, and in 1864 was reorganized as a mounted infantry regiment. As the 38th was assigned to a cavalry brigade after 1864, it is sometimes inaccurately referred to as the 38th Mississippi Cavalry, although this designation was never official.

== History ==
The volunteer companies of the 38th Regiment were organized in the spring of 1862 and assembled at Jackson. The Regiment was sent to Corinth and arrived at the end of the siege a few days before the Confederate garrison was evacuated to Tupelo. The 38th was then assigned to Colonel John D. Martin's brigade and was present at the Battle of Iuka, where commanding officer Colonel Fleming W. Adams was wounded and command of the Regiment passed to Lieutenant Colonel Preston Brent.

Union attack on the 3rd Louisiana Redan on June 25, 1863, at Vicksburg, with the 38th Mississippi among the defenders.

At the battle of Corinth, the regiment was sent to attack the defensive works, taking heavy fire, and the brigade commander Colonel John D. Martin was killed. The regiment was then sent to the defensive lines of Vicksburg, arriving in February 1863. Several men of the 38th were killed or wounded during the siege of Vicksburg, coming under fire from sharpshooters or hit by explosions when Union forces set off mines under the fortifications. The 38th fended off major attacks on the defensive lines on May 19, May 22, and June 25. Lieutenant Colonel Preston Brent was wounded in the trenches at Vicksburg and command of the Regiment passed to Major R.C. Mccay. On July 4, 1863, the Vicksburg garrison surrendered and the 38th regiment was paroled until it could be exchanged. Many of the men deserted after Vicksburg and evaded attempts to return them to service.

In January 1864, the regiment was reorganized as the 38th Mounted Infantry. As a mounted infantry regiment, the 38th was expected to ride with cavalry regiments, and dismount from their horses for infantry combat. The 38th joined other cavalry units as part of H.P. Mabry's brigade, tasked with opposing Federal raids across Mississippi. After skirmishes with Union troops during the Yazoo expedition, Mabry's brigade was assigned to General Nathan Bedford Forrest's command. During the Battle of Tupelo on July 14, commanding officer of the regiment Major R.C. McCay was killed, and all but one of the other regimental officers of the 38th were killed or wounded.

The remainder of the Regiment under Mabry's command took part in various skirmishes with Union cavalry in late 1864, before being reassigned to Wirt Adam's brigade and consolidated into a combined regiment with the 14th Mississippi Cavalry and 3rd Mississippi State Troops. This combined unit fought a final skirmish at the Sipsey River on April 6, 1865, before surrendering under General Richard Taylor on May 4.

== Commanders ==
Commanding officers of the 38th Mississippi Infantry:

- Col. Fleming W. Adams, wounded at Iuka, resigned 1862.
- Col. Preston Brent, wounded at Vicksburg.
- Lt. Col. Walter L. Keirn, wounded at Corinth, resigned 1864.
- Lt. Col. James H. Jones
- Maj. R.C. McCay, killed at Tupelo.

== Organization ==
Companies of the 38th Mississippi Infantry:

- Co. A, "Holmes County Volunteers"
- Co. B, "Van Dorn Guards" of Claiborne County
- Co. C, "Hancock Rebels" of Hancock County
- Co. D, "Wilkinson Guards" of Wilkinson County
- Co. E, "White Rebels" of Lawrence County
- Co. F, "Johnston Avengers" of Copiah County
- Co. G, "Wolf Creek Marksmen" of Attala County
- Co. H, "Price Relief" of Hinds, Madison County, Newton, and Scott Counties
- Co. I, "Columbia Guards" of Marion County
- Co. K, "Brent Rifles" of Pike County

== See also ==
- List of Mississippi Civil War Confederate units
