= John McArthur (general) =

American Union Army general (1826–1906)

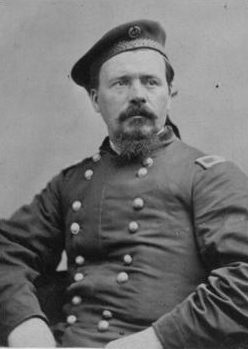
- Born: November 17, 1826; Erskine, Scotland
- Died: May 15, 1906 (aged 79); Chicago, Illinois
- Burial place: Rosehill Cemetery
- Military career
- Allegiance: United States: Union
- Branch: United States Army: Union Army
- Service years: 1861–1865
- Rank: Brigadier General; Brevet Major General
- Commands: 12th Illinois Volunteer Infantry
- Conflicts: American Civil War: Battle of Fort Donelson; Battle of Shiloh; Battle of Corinth; Siege of Vicksburg; Battle of Nashville; Battle of Fort Blakeley

John McArthur (November 17, 1826 – May 15, 1906) was a Union general during the American Civil War. McArthur became one of the most capable Federal commanders in the Western Theater.

== Early life ==
McArthur was born in Erskine, Scotland. He learned to be a blacksmith and emigrated to the United States at age 23 and settled in Chicago. He was the proprietor of the Excelsior Iron Works. He also served in the Chicago Highland Guards militia unit.

== Civil War ==
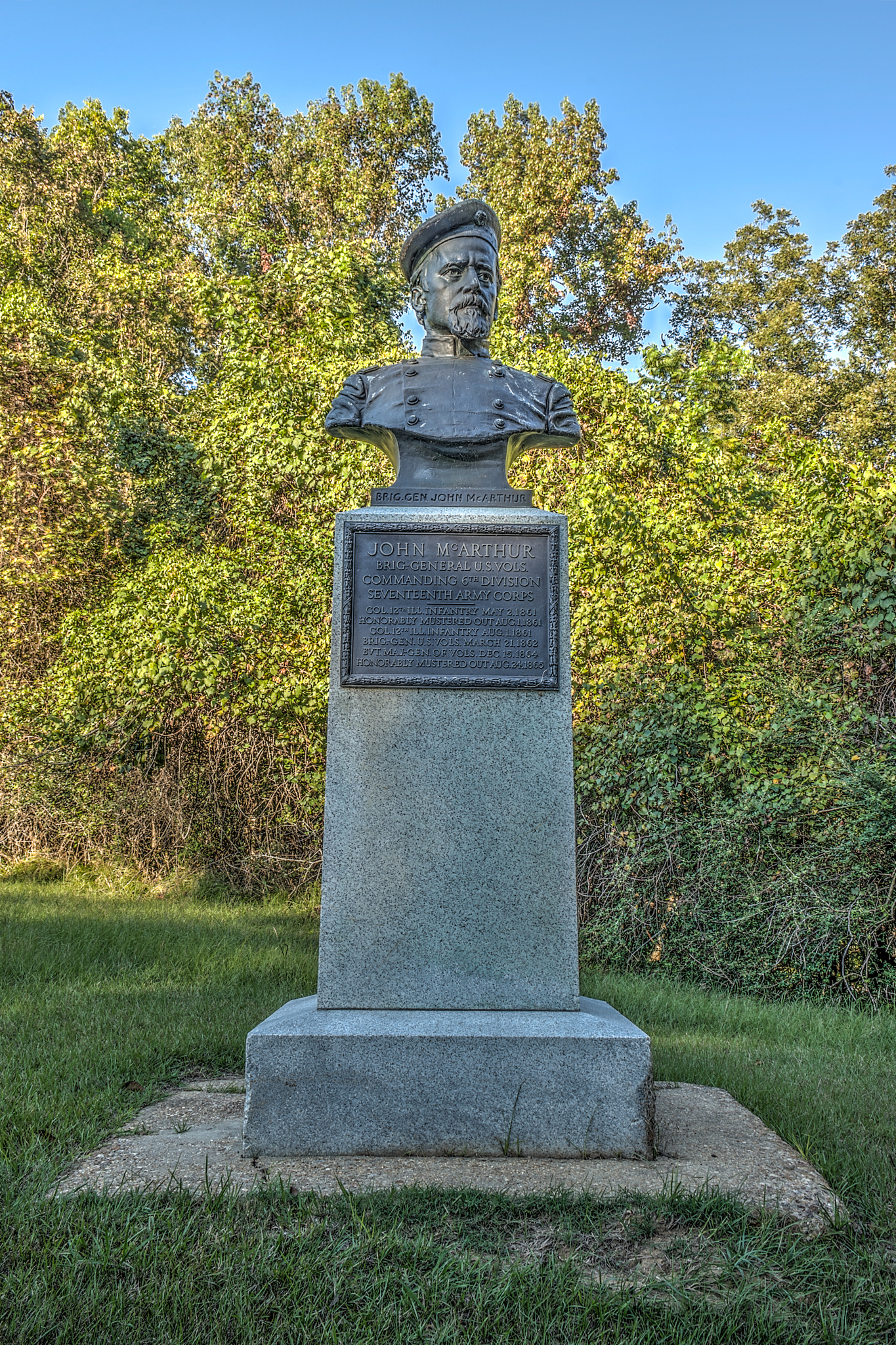
Statue by George E. Ganiere at Vicksburg National Military Park

Following the outbreak of the Civil War, McArthur was appointed colonel of the 12th Illinois Volunteer Infantry. Shortly after, he was elevated to command the 1st Brigade in Brig. Gen. Charles F. Smith's division and saw action at the Battle of Fort Donelson. Even though Smith's division was deployed on the left flank of the Union line, McArthur's brigade was detached to John A. McClernand's division to extend the right flank toward the Cumberland River. McArthur's brigade was never positioned correctly and when the Confederates made their breakout attempt, McArthur and Richard J. Oglesby's neighboring brigade suffered heavily. Despite this both brigades withdrew in relatively good order.

Following Fort Donelson, McArthur was promoted to brigadier general on March 21, 1862, and led the 2nd Brigade, 2nd Division of the Army of the Tennessee at the Battle of Shiloh. Members of his brigade wore Scottish caps and were thus nicknamed the "Highland Brigade". McArthur was wounded leading his brigade in a breakout of the Confederate encirclement on the first day of Shiloh. He led his brigade during the following Siege of Corinth.

Following the capture of Corinth, McArthur took command of the 6th Division and was ordered to reinforce Maj. Gen. William S. Rosecrans's Army of Mississippi, stationed at Corinth. On the eve of the Battle of Corinth, Brigadier General Thomas J. McKean arrived from St. Louis and due to his rank superseded McArthur in command of the division. Orders were given placing McKean in command of the division but no orders were given to reassign McArthur. Therefore, McArthur was without a command for a brief period but remained close at hand; even helping Colonel John M. Oliver position the pickets for his neighboring brigade. A staff officer at Rosecrans's headquarters remembered McArthur's predicament and a special order was immediately sent out returning McArthur to command of the 1st Brigade, 6th Division, which had recently been commanded by Colonel Benjamin Allen while McArthur was in divisional command.

After Corinth, McArthur returned to command the 6th Division, now part of the XVII Corps. He led it during the Siege of Vicksburg and commanded the post at Vicksburg after the Confederate surrender. He was in command of the 1st Division, XVI Corps and was involved in the pursuit of Sterling Price's Missouri Raid. His division was transferred with the rest of the corps to Tennessee, where his troops played a significant role in breaking the Confederate lines on the second day of the Battle of Nashville. He received a brevet promotion to major general of volunteers for his actions in that battle. He also led his division into action at the Battle of Fort Blakeley.

== Postwar life ==
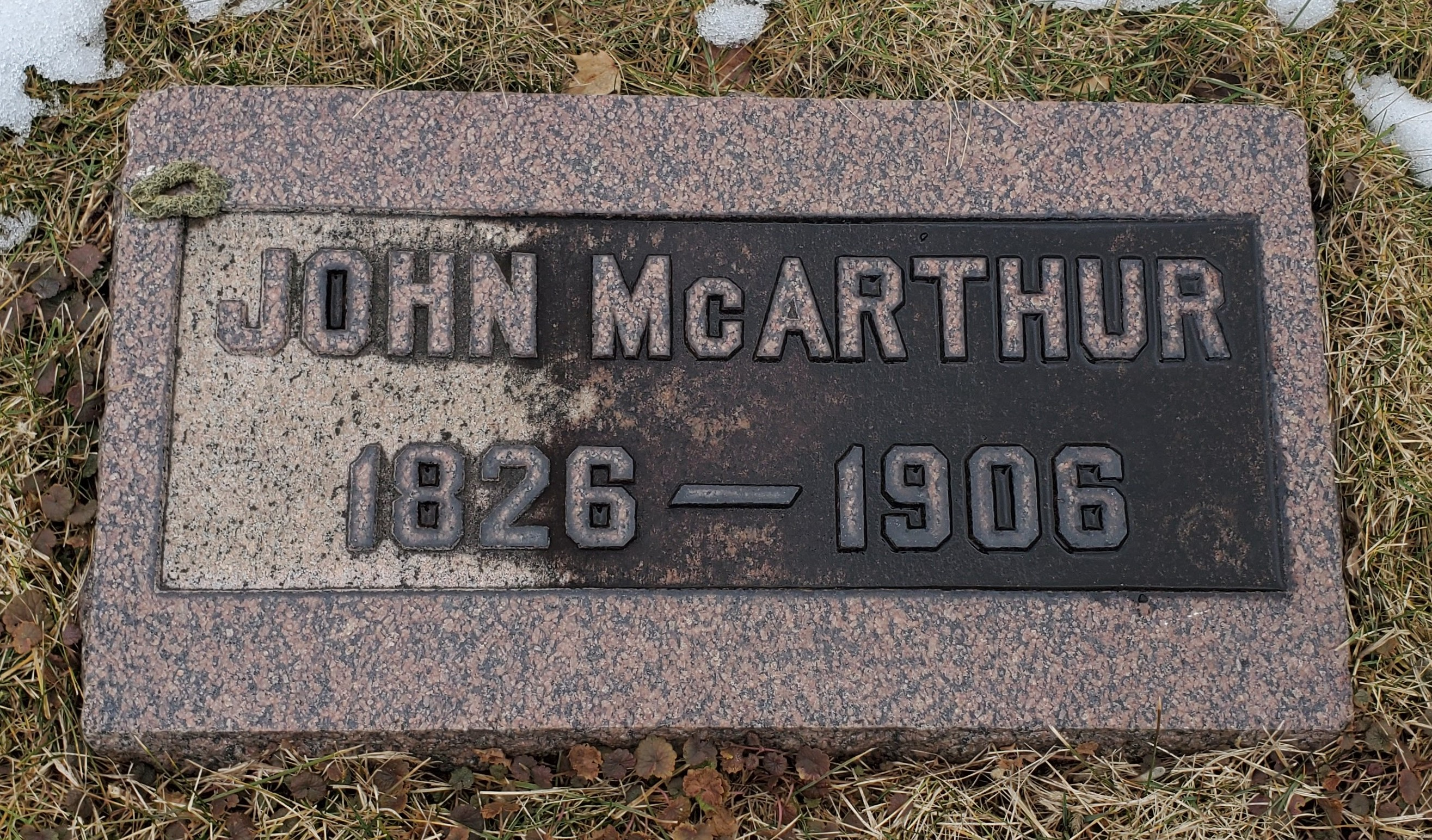
McArthur's grave at Rosehill Cemetery

After the war, he was involved in a number of occupations, including Commissioner of Chicago Public Works during the Chicago Fire, postmaster of Chicago, and general manager of the Chicago and Vert Island Stone Company. In 1875, he was elected as a member of the American Philosophical Society.

McArthur died in Chicago on May 15, 1906, and was buried at Rosehill Cemetery.

== See also ==
- List of American Civil War generals (Union)
