= Cyrus Sears =

American Civil War soldier (1832–1909)

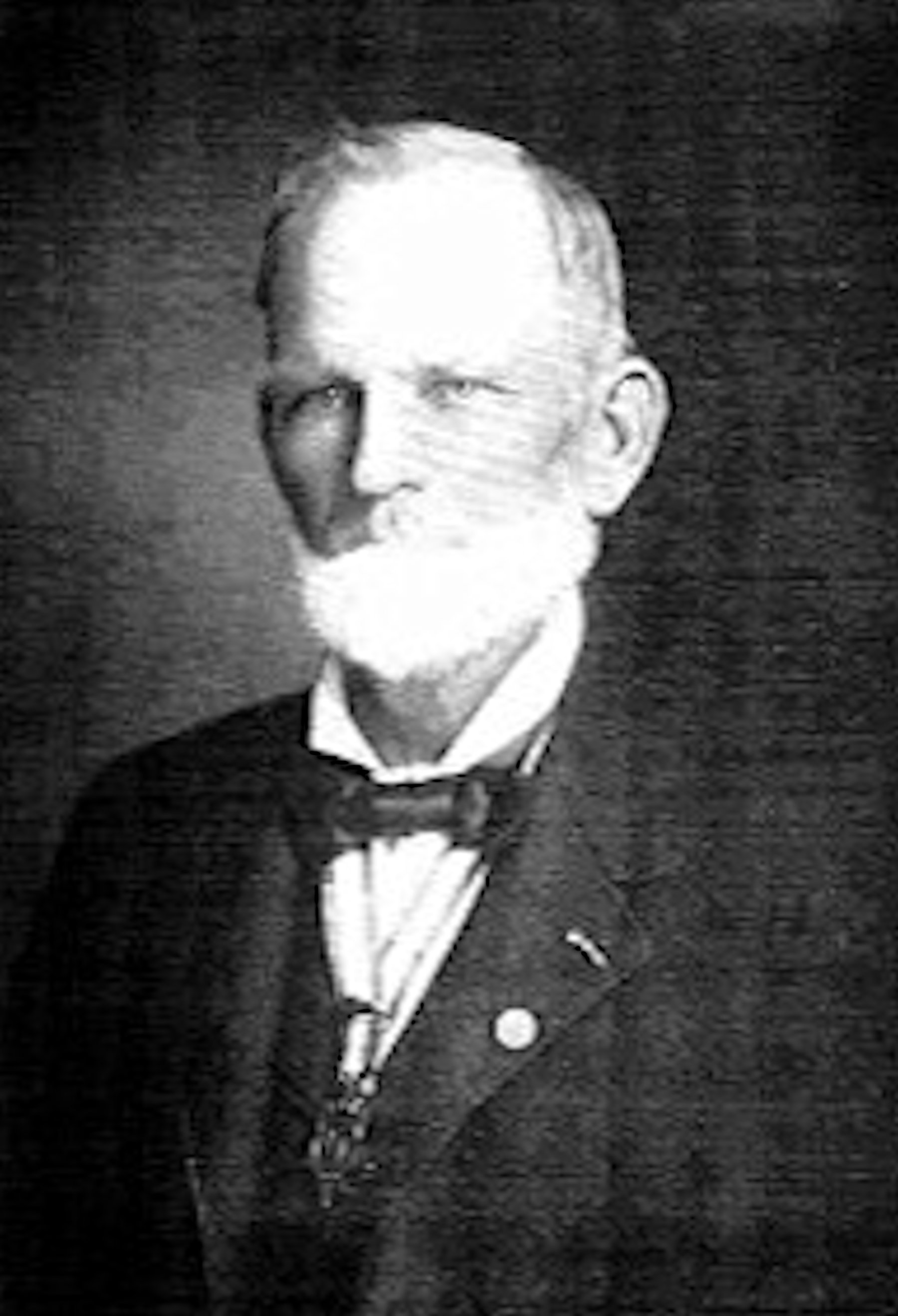
- Medal of Honor winner Cyrus Sears 1903
- Born: March 10, 1832; Meredith, New York
- Died: November 30, 1909 (aged 77)
- Burial place: Oak Hill Cemetery, Upper Sandusky, Ohio
- Military career
- Allegiance: United States of America
- Branch: United States Army; Union Army
- Rank: Lieutenant Colonel
- Unit: 11th Battery, Ohio Light Artillery
- Conflicts: Battle of Iuka; American Civil War
- Awards: Medal of Honor

Cyrus Sears (March 10, 1832 – November 30, 1909) was an American soldier who fought in the American Civil War. Sears received his country's highest award for bravery during combat, the Medal of Honor. Sear's medal was awarded for his heroism during the Battle of Iuka in Mississippi on 19 September 1862. He was honored with the award on December 31, 1892.

Sears was born in Meredith, New York, and entered service in Bucyrus, Ohio. He was buried in Upper Sandusky, Ohio.

== Medal of Honor citation ==
The President of the United States of America, in the name of Congress, takes pleasure in presenting the Medal of Honor to First Lieutenant (Field Artillery) Cyrus Sears, United States Army, for extraordinary heroism on 19 September 1862, while serving with Battery 11, Ohio Light Artillery, in action at Iuka, Mississippi. Although severely wounded, First Lieutenant Sears fought his battery until the cannoneers and horses were nearly all killed or wounded.

== See also ==
- List of American Civil War Medal of Honor recipients: Q–S
