= Louis Hébert (officer) =

American educator, civil engineer, writer and soldier

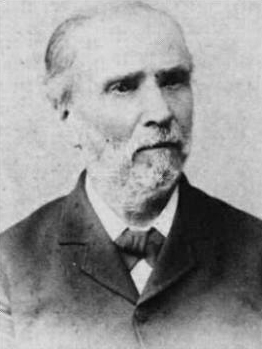
- Born: March 13, 1820; Iberville Parish, Louisiana
- Died: January 20, 1901 (aged 80); Breaux Bridge, Louisiana
- Military career
- Allegiance: United States of America; Confederate States of America
- Branch: United States Army; Confederate States Army
- Service years: 1845–1847 (USA); 1861–1865 (CSA)
- Rank: Second Lieutenant (USA); Brigadier General (CSA)
- Conflicts: American Civil War: Battle of Wilson's Creek; Battle of Pea Ridge; Battle of Iuka; Second Battle of Corinth; Battle of Vicksburg
- Other work: Civil Engineer, Educator, Newspaper editor

Louis Hébert (March 13, 1820 – January 20, 1901) was an American educator, civil engineer, writer and soldier who became a brigadier general in the Confederate States Army during the American Civil War.

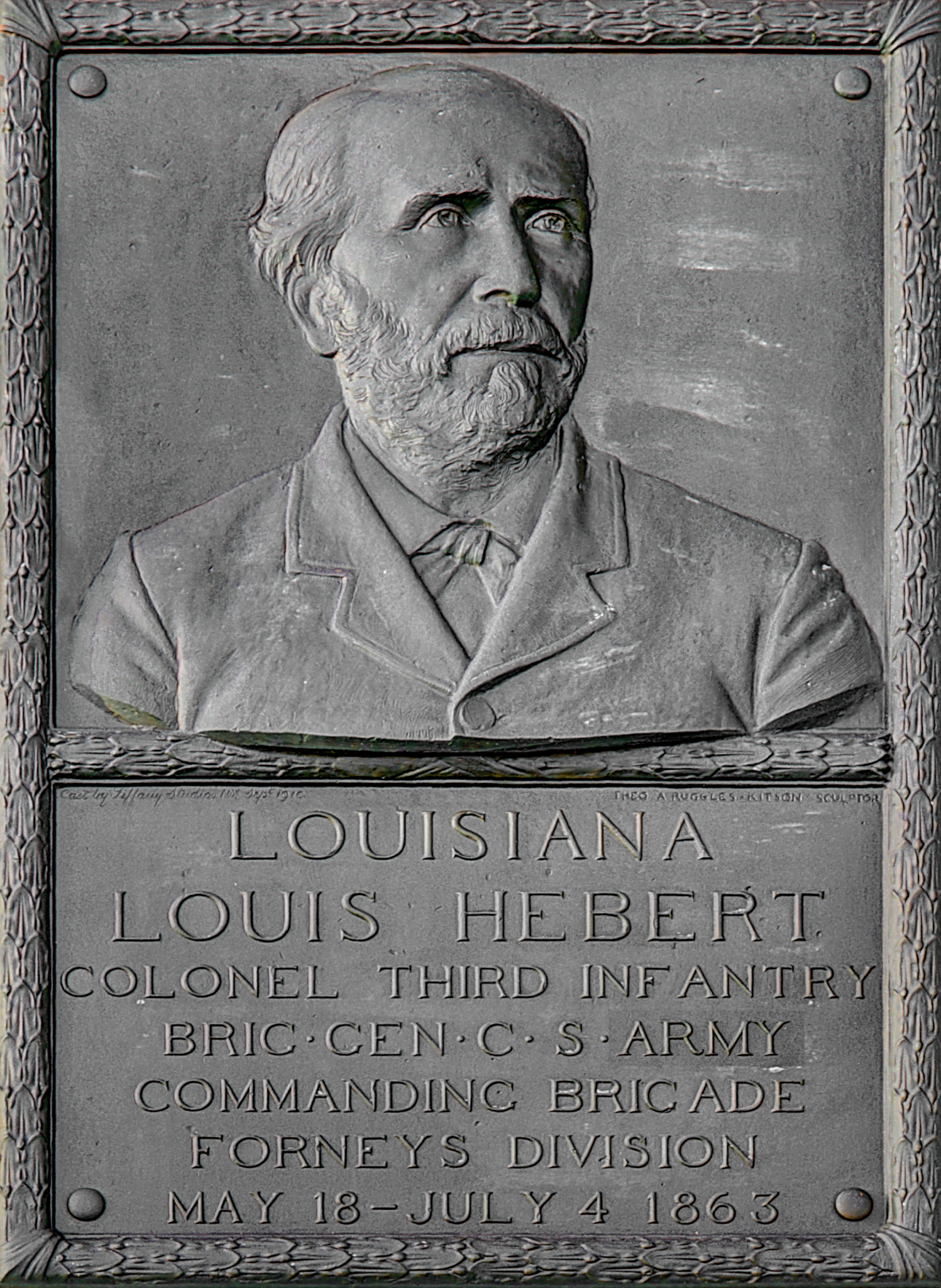
Relief portrait of Hébert by T.A.R. Kitson at Vicksburg National Military Park

== Early life ==
Born in Iberville Parish, Louisiana, Louis Hébert was the first cousin of engineer, Governor Paul Octave Hébert. Louis Hébert graduated from the United States Military Academy in 1845 and was assigned as a brevet second lieutenant to the construction of Fort Livingston, Louisiana. He resigned his commission on February 15, 1846, to run his ailing father's plantation. He became a state militia officer in 1847, a Louisiana state legislator and chief engineer of the State of Louisiana (1855–1860).

== American Civil War ==
Hébert was commissioned Colonel of the 3rd Louisiana Infantry Regiment on May 11, 1861. He fought with his regiment at the Battle of Wilson's Creek. He led Brigadier General Benjamin McCulloch's infantry brigade at the Pea Ridge on March 7, 1862, while McCulloch led the brigade's division. Hébert was technically in command of the division after McCulloch and his second in command, Brigadier General James M. McIntosh, were killed in action. However, Hébert, who was wounded, and a small group of his men had become separated from the brigade and were captured before Hebert could exercise command of the division.

Hébert was exchanged on March 20, 1862. On May 26, 1862, Hébert was appointed brigadier general. His appointment was confirmed by the Confederate Senate on September 30, 1862. He led a brigade in 1862 at the Battle of Iuka, a division at the Second Battle of Corinth and a brigade at the Siege of Vicksburg (May 18 – July 4, 1863). He was again made a prisoner of war after the Confederate surrender at Vicksburg. He was paroled and exchanged on October 13, 1863. He then served in Confederate operations in the Cape Fear District in North Carolina first in artillery and then as chief engineer of the department. He commanded the heavy artillery at and around Fort Fisher.

== Post-war ==
After the war Hébert was an editor and publisher of a local St. Martin's parish newspaper, Iberville South, and taught at several private schools.

Louis Hébert died January 7, 1901, on the east bank of Bayou Teche, 6 miles (9.7 km) north of Breaux Bridge, Louisiana, where he was interred. Because his burial site was located on private land, with assistance from the Sons of Confederate Veterans on October 26, 2002, Hébert's remains were disinterred and moved to St. Joseph Catholic Cemetery in nearby Cecilia, Louisiana.

== See also ==
- List of American Civil War generals (Confederate)
