= John Donelson Martin =

Confederate officer (1830–1862)

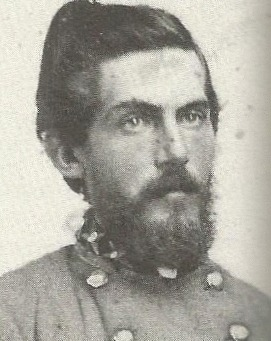
- Colonel John Donelson Martin CSA
- Born: August 18, 1830; Davidson County, Tennessee, US
- Died: October 3, 1862 (aged 32); Corinth, Mississippi
- Burial place: Elmwood Cemetery, Memphis, Tennessee
- Spouse: Rosalie A. White
- Relatives: Rachel Jackson (grandaunt); Andrew Jackson Donelson (cousin); Daniel Smith Donelson (cousin); John Donelson Martin, Sr. (grandson)
- Military career
- Allegiance: United States; Confederate States of America
- Branch: United States Army; Confederate States Army
- Service years: 1846–48 (USA); 1861–62 (CSA)
- Rank: Private (USA); Colonel; Brigadier General (Acting)
- Units: 3rd Tennessee Volunteer Infantry (USA); 154th Senior Tennessee Infantry (CSA)
- Commands: 25th Mississippi Infantry; Bowen's Brigade; 4th Bde, 1st Div, Army of the West
- Conflicts: Mexican–American War; American Civil War: Battle of Shiloh; Battle of Iuka; 2nd Battle of Corinth †

John Donelson Martin (1830–1862) was a Confederate States Army officer during the American Civil War.

== Early life ==
John Martin was born on August 18, 1830, in Davidson County, Tennessee. In 1846 he volunteered for the Mexican–American War, serving as a private in the 3rd Tennessee Infantry Regiment (Company D) until war's end in 1848.

== Civil War ==
When the American Civil War erupted in 1861 Martin joined the Confederate States Army and was named Captain of the Hickory Rifles, a company of infantry from Memphis and Shelby County. It soon became Company E of the 154th Senior Tennessee Infantry Regiment; Martin himself becoming the regiment's Major in May 1861.

During the summer Martin raised a regiment with 7 companies from Mississippi and 3 from Tennessee. He was promoted to Colonel and assigned to command this unit; known as 25th Mississippi Infantry (also as 1st Mississippi Valley Regiment). In January 1862 it was renamed 2nd Confederate Infantry.

Fighting in the Battle of Shiloh Martin took over brigade command when his commander, Brigadier John S. Bowen, was wounded. His services were noted and he was recommended for promotion to brigadier general. Simultaneously, he was named acting brigadier general and assigned to command a brigade in the Army of the West, composed of the 36th, 37th and 38th Mississippi regiments as well as the 37th Alabama Infantry.

Colonel Martin was killed in the Second Battle of Corinth on October 3, 1862, while leading his men. He was buried on Elmwood Cemetery in Memphis; leaving behind his widow and his son, who died at the age of 32 years, just like his father. His grandson was Judge John Donelson Martin, Sr.

== See also ==
- John Donelson Martin Sr.
- List of American Civil War generals (Confederate)
- John Donelson § Descendants
