= Thomas J. McKean =

American politician

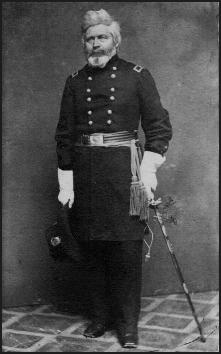
- Thomas Jefferson McKean
- Born: Thomas Jefferson McKean; August 21, 1810; Burlington, Pennsylvania
- Died: April 19, 1870 (aged 59); Marion, Iowa
- Burial place: Oak Shade Cemetery, Marion, Iowa
- Military career
- Allegiance: United States of America; Union
- Branch: United States Army; Union Army
- Service years: 1831–1834, 1837–1838, 1847–1848, 1861–1865
- Rank: Brigadier General; Brevet Major General
- Units: 4th U.S. Infantry; 15th U.S. Infantry
- Commands: 6th Division, Army of the Tennessee
- Conflicts: Seminole Wars; Mexican–American War; Battle of Contreras; Battle of Churubusco; Battle of Molino del Rey; Battle of Chapultepec; American Civil War; Siege of Corinth; Second Battle of Corinth

Thomas Jefferson McKean (August 21, 1810 – April 19, 1870) was an American engineer, soldier, politician, and farmer. A West Point graduate, he fought in the United States Army during the Seminole Wars, in the Mexican–American War, and he served as a general in the Union Army during the American Civil War. He commanded the District of West Florida at the end of the Civil War in January 1865.

Born in Pennsylvania he became a civil engineer and served in the U.S. Army. After serving in the army, he returned to Pennsylvania to work as a civil engineer in 1834. He served in the military again during the Seminole Wars before moving to Iowa Territory in 1840. He was a delegate to Iowa's constitutional convention. He enlisted and served in the Mexican–American War. He served in various command roles in the Union Army during the Civil War. Afterwards he was elected mayor of Marion, Iowa.

== Early life and career ==
Thomas J. McKean was born in 1810 in the borough of Burlington located in Bradford County, Pennsylvania. He entered the United States Military Academy in West Point in 1827, and graduated four years later, standing 19th out of 33 cadets. McKean was commissioned a brevet second lieutenant in the 4th U.S. Infantry on July 1, 1831. His service in the U.S. Army consisted of several stints of garrison duty over the next three years, during which he was promoted to second lieutenant on September 15, 1833. McKean resigned from the U.S. Army the following year on March 31.

After resigning in 1834, McKean took up work as a civil engineer. He then participated in the Seminole Wars in 1837–38, serving as adjutant of the 1st Pennsylvania Volunteers, with the rank of first lieutenant. McKean resigned on March 31, 1838, and returned to Pennsylvania and the profession of an engineer. In 1840 he relocated to Marion in the Iowa Territory, and in 1844 he was part of the constitutional convention aimed at creating the state of Iowa.

During the Mexican–American War, McKean volunteered for service, and enlisted as a private in the 15th U.S. Infantry on April 12, 1847. He was quickly promoted to sergeant major on May 10, and fought in the Battle of Churubusco on August 20, in which he was wounded. That June, McKean was appointed to the rank of brevet second lieutenant in the 2nd U.S. Dragoons, but he chose to decline the commission. After hostilities ended, he was discharged on August 7, 1848. Historian Ezra J. Warner noted McKean's unusual situation of having been trained at West Point and served in other duties as an officer, but was as an enlisted man in combat while in Mexico. Following the war he returned to his civilian life in Iowa, a U.S. state since 1846.

== Civil War service ==
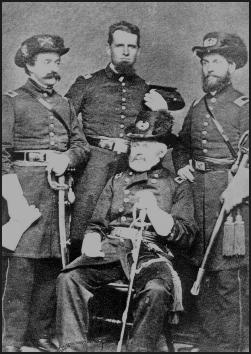
McKean and his staff during the American Civil War

When the American Civil War began in 1861, McKean chose to follow his home state and the Union cause. On June 1 he was appointed the paymaster of the Union Army, and then led the cavalry of the Department of the Gulf beginning on September 18. McKean was briefly in charge of prisoner of war camps in Missouri, and was appointed a brigadier general in the Union Army on November 21.

McKean commanded at Jefferson City, Missouri, from December to March 1862. He was then given divisional command in the Army of the Tennessee on April 10. He fought in the Battle of Corinth in Mississippi on October 3–4, and then led his division until December 9. McKean then commanded numerous districts across Union-held departments throughout 1863, 1864, and until July 10, 1865. McKean was appointed to the rank of brevet major general on March 13 for his war service, and was mustered out of the volunteer service on August 24.

== Postwar ==
After the American Civil War ended in 1865, McKean returned home to Iowa. He was elected Marion's mayor that year, and took up farming close to the city until 1869. He served as a delegate to the Republican convention in Chicago, Illinois, in 1868. McKean was offered the position of pension agent of the eastern Iowa district in early 1870, but he declined it. That April he died in Marion, Iowa, and was buried in the city's Oak Shade Cemetery.

== See also ==
- List of American Civil War generals (Union)
