= 1st Battalion, Mississippi Mounted Rifles =

- Active: March, 1864 – June 26, 1865
- Country: United States
- Allegiance: Union
- Branch: Union Army
- Size: 665 (total)
- Engagements: American Civil War: Battle of Egypt Station

The 1st Battalion, Mississippi Mounted Rifles was a unit in the Union Army during the American Civil War, and was the only Union Mississippi unit created during the Civil War other than regiments of the United States Colored Troops

== History ==
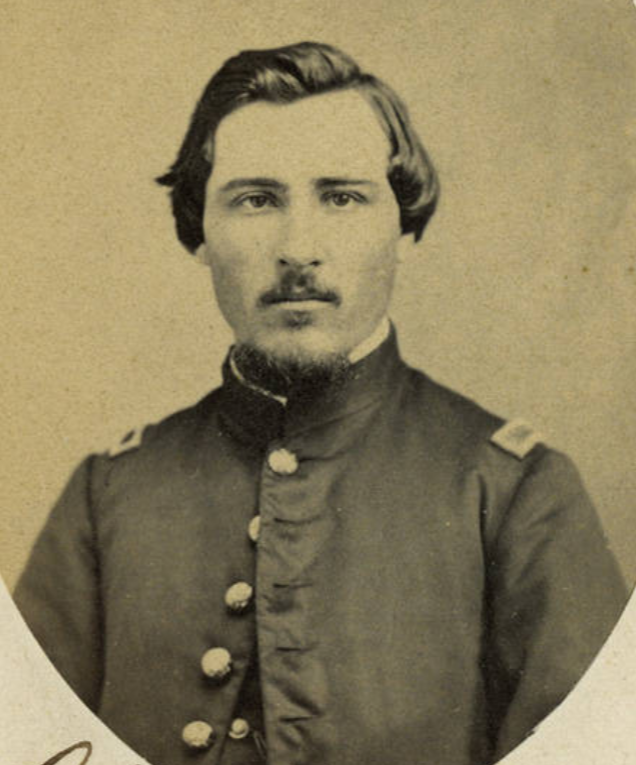
Captain George Leoni, 1st Battalion Mississippi Mounted Rifles. Transferred from 4th Illinois Cavalry Regiment.

The battalion was organized in Memphis, Tennessee, in March 1864, and consisted of Unionist and anti-Confederate volunteers from Mississippi, Tennessee, Arkansas and Alabama. Vicksburg, Memphis, and Corinth were recruiting centers for the battalion. Several of the enlistees were former Confederate soldiers who had left Southern service either via desertion or capture by Union forces. The commanding officers were northerners recruited from Union cavalry regiments.

The battalion deployed from Memphis on July 4, 1864 to Grand Gulf, Mississippi alongside the 7th Indiana Cavalry, 2nd New Jersey Cavalry, and 19th Pennsylvania Cavalry in pursuit of Wood's Mississippi Cavalry under General William Wirt Adams operating in the area. The Union expedition skirmished with Confederate forces in the Port Gibson area before returning to Memphis later that month. Lt. Col. Shorey, commanding the battalion, was wounded in a skirmish near Rocky Springs, Mississippi, captured, and exchanged.

In August 1864, the battalion along with other Union units led by Colonel Joseph Kargé was sent to Oxford, Mississippi and later Holly Springs to oppose General Forrest's cavalry, returning to Memphis the same month. In December 1864, the battalion took part in General Grierson's raid against the Mobile & Ohio Railroad in Mississippi, guarding the pack train during the Battle of Egypt Station on December 28 while the 2nd New Jersey Cavalry, 4th Missouri Cavalry, and 7th Indiana Cavalry under Colonel Kargé fought the Confederates. The battalion returned to Memphis in January, 1865. Later that month the battalion participated in its last action, an excursion into Arkansas and Northeast Louisiana led by Colonel Embury D. Osband. The unit was mustered out of service on June 26, 1865 at Memphis.

A total of 665 men organized into five companies (A-G) served in the battalion.

== Commanders ==
Officers of the 1st Battalion, Mississippi Mounted Rifles:

- Lt. Col. Samuel O. Shorey
- Capt. George N. Leoni
- Capt. Napoleon Snyder

== See also ==
- List of Mississippi Union Civil War units
