= Joseph Kargé =

Joseph Karge
- Józef Karge
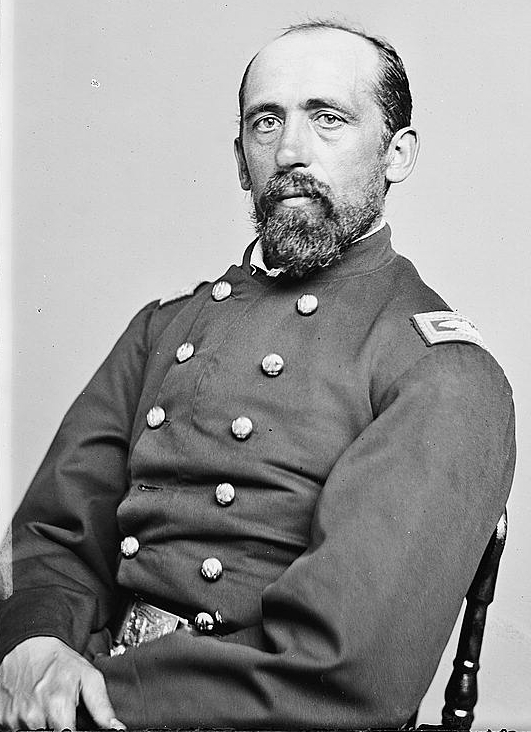
- Born: July 4, 1823; Terespotockie, Kingdom of Prussia (now Poland)
- Died: December 27, 1892 (aged 69); New York City, New York
- Burial place: Princeton Cemetery, Princeton, New Jersey
- Military career
- Allegiance: United States of America
- Branch: United States Army; Union Army
- Service years: 1861–1865; 1867–1871
- Rank: Colonel; Brevet Brigadier General
- Units: 1st New Jersey Cavalry Regiment; 8th U.S. Cavalry Regiment
- Commands: 2nd New Jersey Volunteer Cavalry
- Conflicts: Greater Poland Uprising (1848); American Civil War: Second Battle of Bull Run

Signature
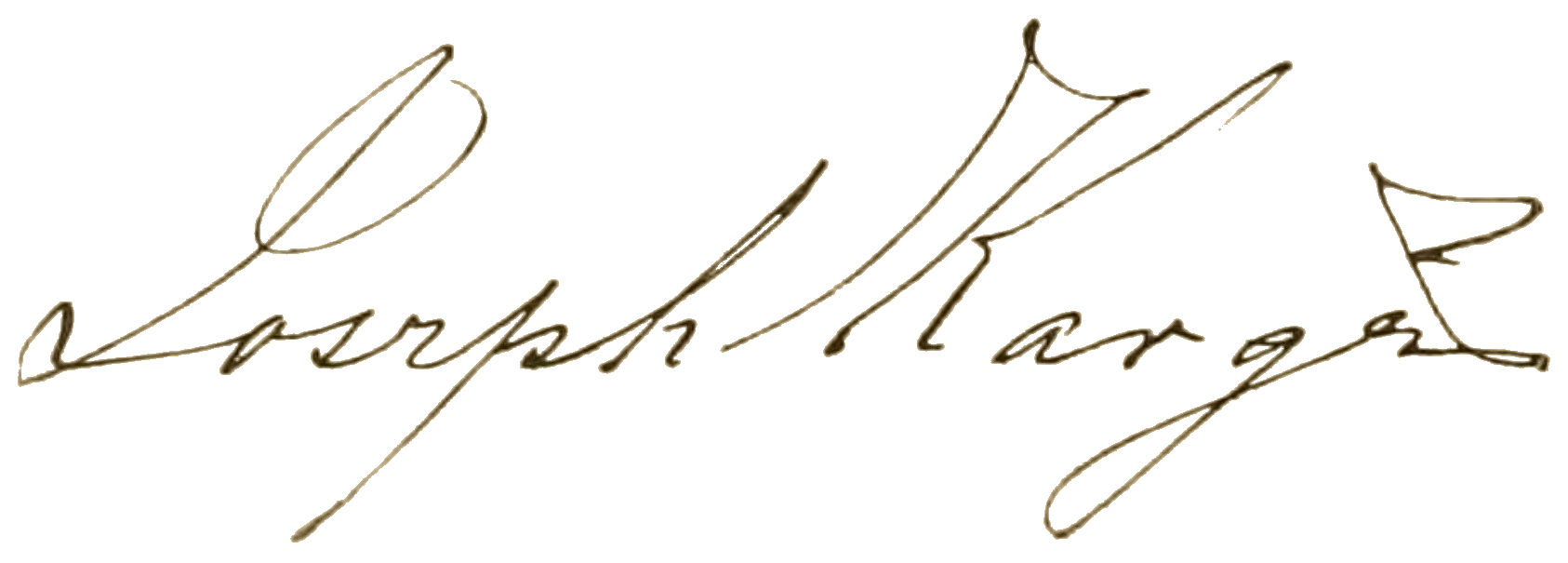

Joseph Kargé (Polish: Józef Karge; July 4, 1823 in Terespotockie, Grand Duchy of Posen, Kingdom of Prussia – December 27, 1892 in New York City) was a Polish insurgent and American military officer and educator. He was involved in the unsuccessful 1848 revolutions in Poland and was sentenced to death. He fled to France, then England, and arrived in New York City in 1851 as a political refugee. Having studied at the University of Breslau and the University of Berlin, he taught classes in classical literature and foreign languages until the Civil War.

== In Poland ==
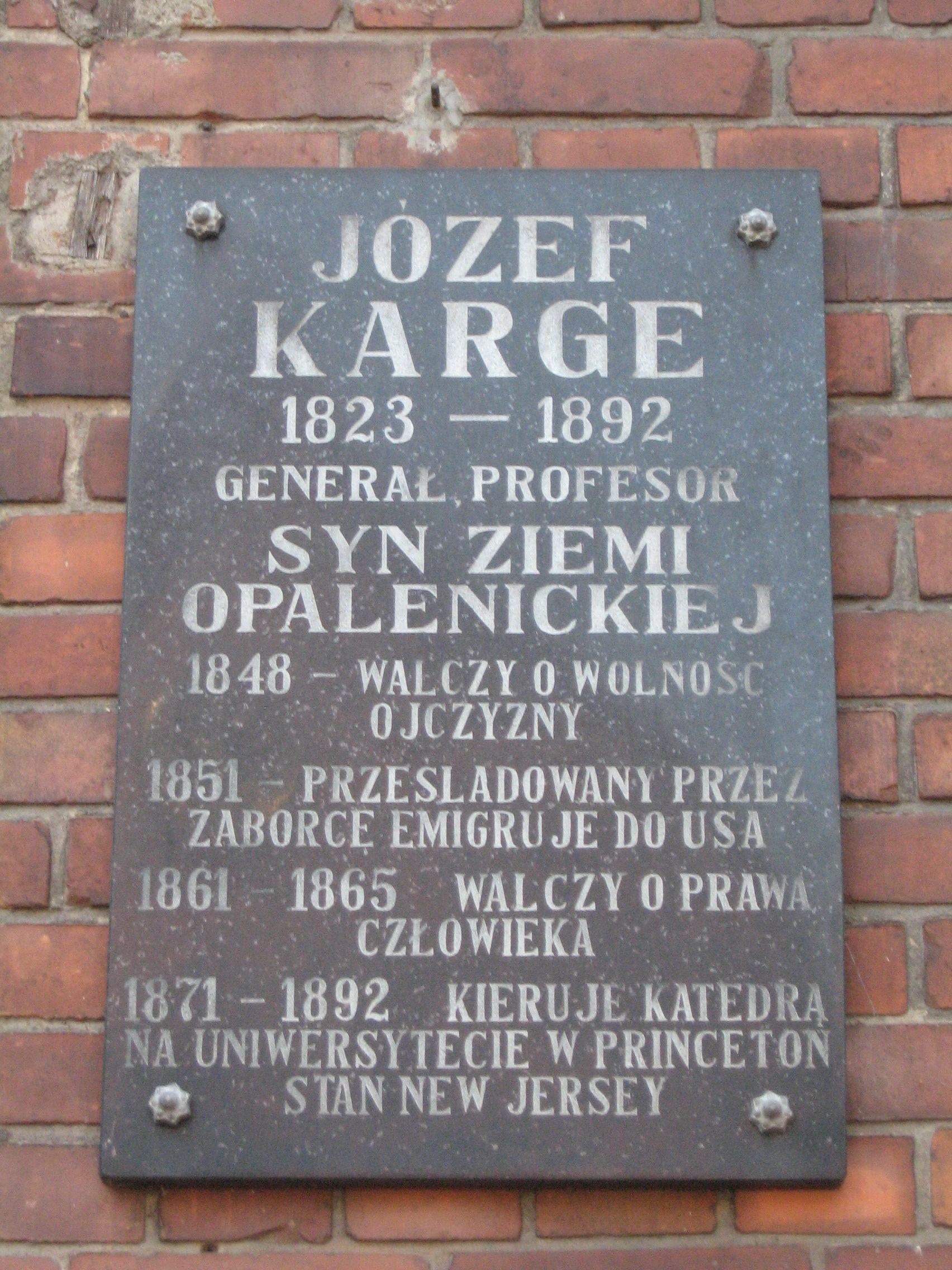
Memorial plaque in Opalenica

Józef Karge was born in the village of Terespotockie near Opalenica in the Prussian Partition of Poland. His father was Jakub Karge and his mother was Weronika née Braniewicz.

During the Greater Poland Uprising of 1848 against Prussian rule, he joined the units of Ludwik Mierosławski.

== Civil War ==
Karge was commissioned the military as lieutenant colonel in the 1st New Jersey Volunteer Cavalry. He was wounded at the Second Battle of Bull Run in 1862, did not heal fully, and was rendered inactive for most of the War. A later Congressional Record from 1894 noted he suffered a gunshot wound that effectively ended his career in the military.

Kargé was promoted to colonel of the new 2nd New Jersey Volunteer Cavalry in November 1863 and took part in raids of Tennessee and Alabama. His victory over General Nathan Bedford Forrest at Bolivar, Tennessee, resulted in a rare cavalry victory over Forrest, who developed a reputation as a superb cavalry leader. In December 1864 Col. Kargé led the 1st. Brigade of Brig. Gen. Benjamin Grierson's 2nd Cavalry Division. The 1st. Brigade included the 2nd New Jersey Cavalry – Lt. Col. P. Jones Yorke, 7th Indiana Cavalry – Capt. J. H. Elliott, 4th Missouri Cavalry – Capt. Hencke, and the 1st Mississippi Mounted Rifles.

Kargé was brevetted brigadier general by Lincoln on March 13, 1865, "for gallant and meritorious services during the war" at the recommendation of Benjamin Grierson.

Kargé briefly rejoined the regular army in 1867 and served in Arizona with the 8th U.S. Cavalry. His service was cut short when he resigned in 1871. In the latter part of his life, he taught literature at Princeton University for twenty years.

== Bibliography ==
- Kajencki, Francis C (1980). Star on many a battlefield" Brevet Brigadier General Joseph Kargé in the American Civil War. Rutherford: Fairleigh Dickinson University Press. ISBN 9780838621493.
