= Wirt Adams' Cavalry Regiment =

Cavalry regiment of the Confederate States Army

- Active: 1861–1865
- Disbanded: May 4, 1865
- Country: Confederate States
- Allegiance: Mississippi
- Branch: Army
- Type: Cavalry
- Size: Regiment
- Part of: Adams' Brigade
- Facings: Yellow
- Battles: American Civil War; Battle of Shiloh; Battle of Booneville; Battle of Britton's Lane; Battle of Iuka; Second Battle of Corinth; Battle of Champion Hill; Battle of Raymond; Battle of Egypt; Battle of Selma

Commanders
- Notable commanders: Wirt Adams

Wirt Adams' Cavalry Regiment was a unit of the Confederate States Army during the American Civil War, composed of cavalry companies from Mississippi, Alabama, and Louisiana. Originally titled the First Regiment of Mississippi Cavalry, the unit was renamed after its commander, Wirt Adams, in December, 1861. After Adams was promoted to Brigadier general in 1863, the unit was renamed Wood's Regiment, but it is most commonly known in historical sources as Wirt Adams' Cavalry. The regiment fought in various battles in Mississippi and Tennessee, and spent the second half of the war operating in the Mississippi Delta, opposing Federal cavalry raids after Union forces took control of most of the strategic points in that state. The Regiment surrendered in Alabama on May 4, 1865.

== History ==
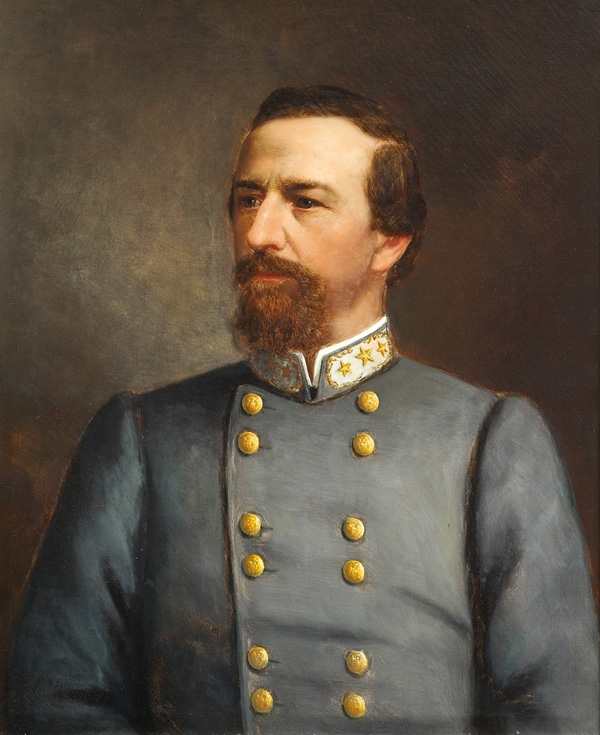
Postbellum portrait of Wirt Adams.

The Regiment was organized by Wirt Adams, a prominent banker and former member of the Mississippi House of Representatives. After secession, Adams wrote to Confederate President Jefferson Davis offering to organize a regiment for the war, and he was offered command of eight cavalry companies from Mississippi, two from Louisiana, and five from Alabama. These companies were organized into a cavalry regiment in the summer of 1861, and the troops under Adams proceeded to Kentucky in September to join the Confederate forces there. Originally designated the "First Regiment of Mississippi Cavalry", the name of the unit was officially changed to the "Wirt Adams Regiment of Cavalry" on December 24, 1861, by order of the Confederate Secretary of War, reporting a total strength of 778 men. Another unrelated Regiment, led by Col. A.J. Lindsay and Col. R.A. Pinson, was later designated the 1st Mississippi Cavalry Regiment.

During the Confederate retreat from Kentucky, Adams' Regiment acted as rearguard, and then fought at the Battle of Shiloh. The Regiment fought at the siege of Corinth, and skirmished against Federal cavalry in Tennessee, North Mississippi and North Alabama, including the Battle of Booneville in July, 1862 and the Battle of Britton's Lane in September.

Adams' Regiment fought at the Battle of Iuka and the Second Battle of Corinth, as part of Brig. Gen. Frank Crawford Armstrong's cavalry brigade in Maj. Gen. Sterling Price's Corps. They covered the Army's retreat after Confederates failed to retake Corinth. Afterwards the Regiment was sent to Washington County in the Mississippi Delta during the Vicksburg Campaign. In 1863 the Regiment skirmished with Federal cavalry during Grierson's Raid across Mississippi and fought at the Battle of Champion Hill and the Battle of Raymond.

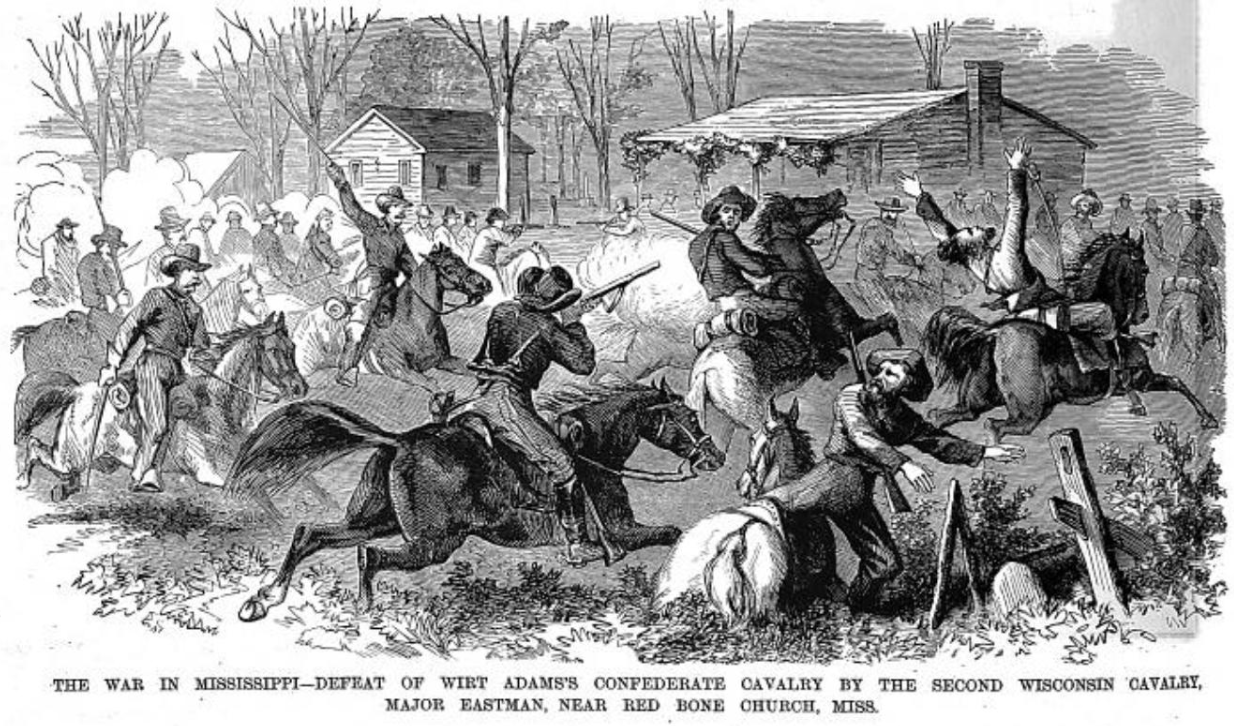
Depiction of Adams' Cavalry clashing with Union troops of the 2nd Wisconsin Cavalry Regiment at Redbone Church, Mississippi, April 21, 1863

Wirt Adams was promoted to Brigadier general on September 25, 1863; Robert C. Wood Jr. was promoted to Colonel, and the Regiment was subsequently known as Wood's Regiment. The regiment continued to operate near the Mississippi river around Vicksburg after the fall of that city to Union forces in July, 1863, clashing with Federal forces under the command of General James B. McPherson at various locations in the vicinity. When Union General William T. Sherman began his campaign towards Meridian in February, 1864, Wood's Regiment skirmished with Federal troops at several points along their line of march.

The Regiment fought further battles against Union forces in Mississippi in 1864 and 1865, including the Battle of Egypt during Grierson's 1864 raid against the Mobile and Ohio Railroad. In the final stages of the war, Adams' brigade, including his former regiment, was attached to Forrest's Cavalry Corps, and fought in the Battle of Selma before surrendering in Sumter County, Alabama on May 4, 1865.

== Commanders ==
Commanders of Adams'/Wood's Regiment:

- Col. Wirt Adams, promoted to Brigadier general September 1863.
- Col. Robert C. Wood Jr.
- Lt. Col. Thomas Lewers
- Lt. Col. Stephen B. Cleaveland

== Organization ==
Companies of Adams'/Wood's Regiment:

- Company A, "Tensas Cavalry" of Louisiana (later transferred).
- Company A, formed from Company K of Yazoo County, Mississippi, in 1864.
- Company B, of De Soto County and Senatobia, Mississippi.
- Company C
- Company D, of Madison and Leake Counties, Mississippi.
- Company E,
- Company F, of Warren and Claiborne Counties, Mississippi.
- Company G, of Louisiana.
- Company H, "Lowndes Rangers" of Lowndes County, Alabama.
- Company I, of Clarke and Baldwin Counties, Alabama.
- Company K, "Anding Hussars" of Yazoo County, Mississippi.
- Company L
- Company M, "McKie Cavalry" of Canton, Mississippi.

== See also ==
- List of Confederate units from Mississippi
