= Cain Sartain =

American politician

J. Cain Sartain (1843–1902) was a planter, justice of the peace, sheriff, and state legislator in Louisiana. He was a Republican. He and P. Jones Yorke represented Carroll Parish. He served from 1873 to 1878. His final years representing newly created East Carroll Parish.

He contested the election outcome and was declared the rightful winner over Nicholas Burton. Burton contested the 1877 election and eventually won the seat.

In 1879 he wrote to the governor of Kansas (John Pierce St. John) inquiring about emigration opportunities, civil rights, and public accommodations laws in Kansas.
