= Terespotockie =

- Village
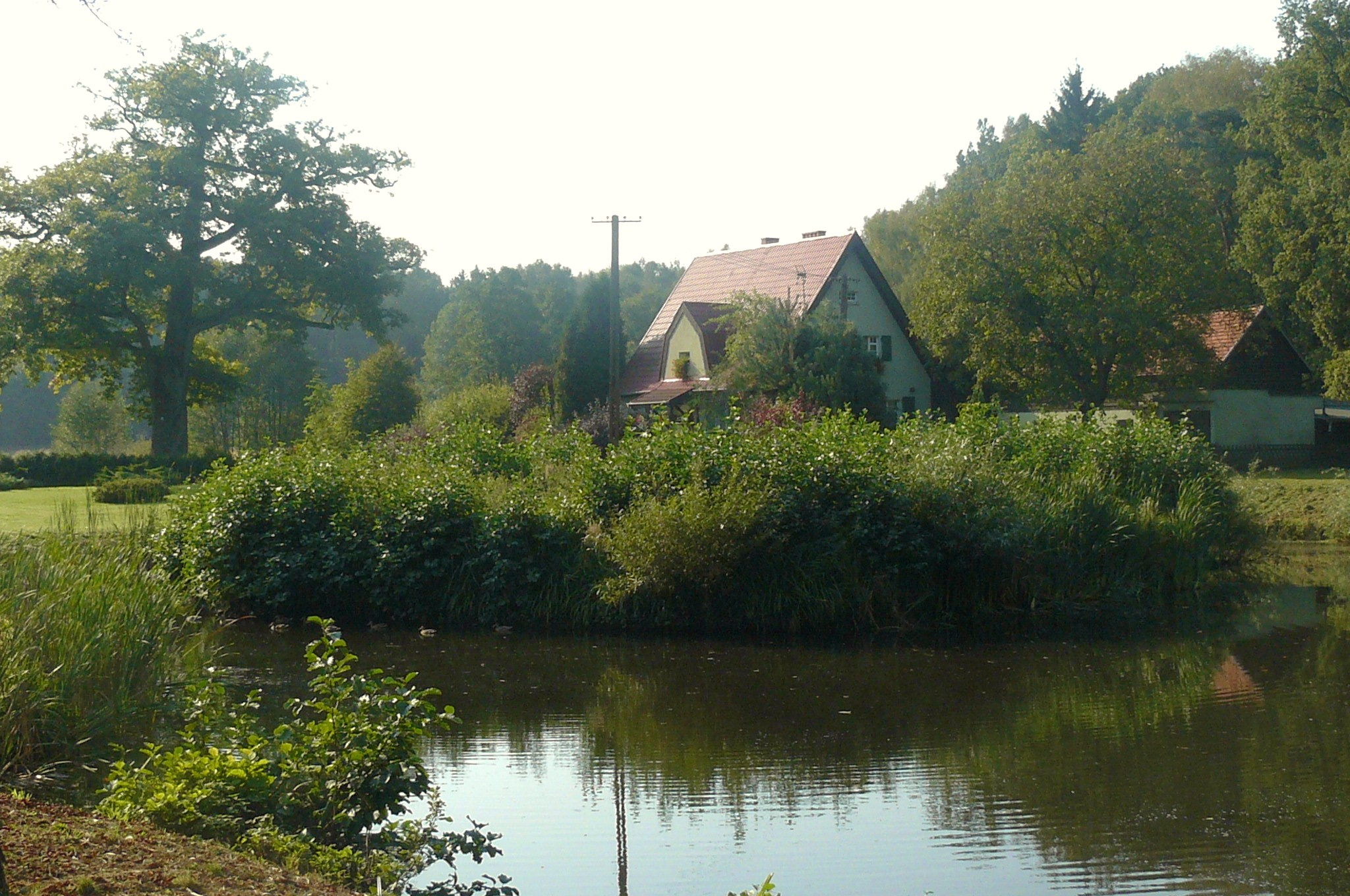

- Location within Poland
- Coordinates: 52°17′N 16°22′E
- Country: Poland
- Voivodeship: Greater Poland
- County: Nowy Tomyśl
- Gmina: Opalenica
- Time zone: UTC+1 (CET)
  - Summer (DST): UTC+2 (CEST)
- Vehicle registration: PNT

Terespotockie [tɛrɛspɔˈtɔt͡skʲɛ] is a village in the administrative district of Gmina Opalenica, within Nowy Tomyśl County, Greater Poland Voivodeship, in west-central Poland.

== History ==
Historical population
| Year | Pop. | ±% |
|---|---|---|
| 1837 | 220 | — |
| 1921 | 345 | +56.8% |

Terespotockie was a private village of the Opaliński family, administratively located in the Kościan County in the Poznań Voivodeship in the Greater Poland Province of the Kingdom of Poland.

According to the 1921 census, the population was 98.6% Polish by nationality, and 85.5% Catholic and 14.5% Lutheran by confession.

Following the German-Soviet invasion of Poland, which started World War II in September 1939, the village was occupied by Germany until 1945.

== Notable people ==
- Joseph Kargé (1823–1892), Polish insurgent, American military officer and university professor
