= Egypt, Chickasaw County, Mississippi =

Egypt, Mississippi
- Unincorporated community
- Location within Mississippi Location within the United States
- Coordinates: 33°53′54″N 88°43′47″W
- Country: United States
- State: Mississippi
- County: Chickasaw
- Elevation: 305 ft (93 m)
- Time zone: UTC-6 (Central (CST))
  - Summer (DST): UTC-5 (CDT)
- Area code: 662
- GNIS feature ID: 669700

Egypt, also known as Pikeville, is an unincorporated community in Chickasaw County, Mississippi, United States. Egypt is 7 miles (11 km) south of Okolona.

== History ==
By July 1860, the Mobile and Ohio Railroad had extended the line through Egypt. A train station had been built by 1874.

Egypt also had two churches, an academy, a broom factory, a grist mill, and a Munger System cotton gin.

A post office operated under the name Pikeville from 1844 to 1859 and under the name Egypt from 1859 to 1979.

The Battle of Egypt Station was fought on December 28, 1864, when Brigadier General Benjamin Grierson's Union cavalry division defeated an outnumbered Confederate force led by Samuel J. Gholson and Franklin Gardner. The Union raiders were intent on damaging the railroad before heading southwest to Vicksburg.

This community was devastated by EF-3 tornadoes on April 27, 2011.
