= Nicholas Burton =

American politician

Nicholas Burton was an American A.M.E. Church minister, sheriff, and politician in Louisiana. He served in the Louisiana House of Representatives in 1877 and 1878.

Burton was involved in a disputed election with Cain Sartain.

== See also ==
- African American officeholders from the end of the Civil War until before 1900
