= Patton Jones Yorke =

American soldier and politician (1843–1893)

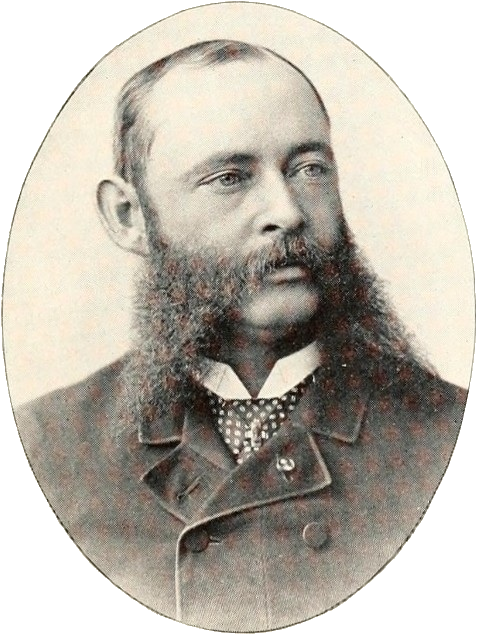
- Born: January 7, 1843; Wilmington, North Carolina
- Died: March 31, 1893 (aged 50); Point Pleasant, New Jersey
- Education: United States Naval Academy (did not graduate)
- Occupations: Cavalryman, Plantation owner, Politician
- Known for: Representing Carroll Parish in the Louisiana House of Representatives
- Spouse: Rebecca E. Coleman (m. 1865)
- Parent: Louis S. Yorke (father)

Patton Jones Yorke (January 7, 1843 – March 31, 1893) was a plantation owner and politician in Louisiana. He represented Carroll Parish in the Louisiana House of Representatives. He served from 1868 to 1873 and again from 1875 to 1876. Noted as P. Jones Yorke, he was a Republican.

He was the eldest son of Louis S. Yorke and Adelaide née Patton Yorke. Patton served as a cavalry officer in the Union Army during the American Civil War. According to a family history he achieved the rank of colonel with a New Jersey cavalry unit.

Originally from Salem, New Jersey, Yorke's father was a merchant seaman and ship's captain who married Adelaide E. Patton of Philadelphia on June 20, 1839. They had two sons and a daughter. Patton was born in Wilmington, North Carolina, but received his preparatory education in Princeton, New Jersey. He entered the United States Naval Academy from New Jersey on September 28, 1857. Yorke studied there for three years, but left without graduating.

At the beginning of the American Civil War, Yorke enlisted in the Commonwealth Artillery of Philadelphia, serving as a corporal from April to August 1861. On August 9, 1861, he was commissioned as a first lieutenant in Company E, 1st New Jersey Cavalry Regiment. On October 3, 1862, Yorke was promoted to captain in Company I, 1st New Jersey Cavalry. On August 27, 1863, he was promoted to major and transferred to the 2nd New Jersey Cavalry. Promoted to lieutenant colonel on July 27, 1864, Yorke served as regimental commander during the Battle of Egypt Station on December 28 while Colonel Joseph Kargé served as brigade commander. He was brevetted colonel on March 13, 1865 for his gallantry as acting commander of the 2nd New Jersey Cavalry at Egypt Station. Yorke was discharged from duty on August 2, 1865 and settled in Louisiana.

Yorke married Rebecca E. Coleman (January 9, 1846 – September 16, 1870) in 1865. They had a son named Louis S. Yorke Jr. (February 14, 1870 – August 4, 1870) who died as an infant. They also had a daughter named Catherine. After his first wife's death, Yorke married Elizabeth "Lizzie" Littell of Albany, New York. Yorke's sister Adelaide married U.S. Army officer Charles King in 1872.

In May 1875, Yorke gave testimony about election issues in Louisiana. He later moved back north, settling at Point Pleasant, New Jersey in 1880 or 1881. Yorke joined the New York Commandery of the Loyal Legion of the United States. He died at his home in Point Pleasant on March 31, 1893. Yorke was interred at White Lawn Cemetery in Point Pleasant.
