= Battle of Whitney's Lane =

1862 battle of the American Civil War

- Part of the American Civil War
Date	May 19, 1862
Location	White County, Arkansas 35°14′46″N 91°40′33″W
Result	United States victory

Belligerents
United States	(Confederate States of America) Confederate States

Commanders and leaders
Samuel R. Curtis; Frederick Steele; Henry W. Halleck; Peter J. Osterhaus	John Selden Roane

Strength
30,000	1,200

Casualties and losses
51	10
- Location within Arkansas

The Battle of Whitney's Lane, also known as the Action at Whitney's Lane, was a small, but psychologically important, land battle of the American Civil War fought on May 19, 1862, in north-central Arkansas.

== Strategic situation ==
=== Union situation ===
In early 1862, Union Major General Samuel R. Curtis had successfully invaded northwest Arkansas and defeated Confederate forces at the Battle of Pea Ridge. Soon after, most Confederate forces in Arkansas were withdrawn across the Mississippi River, leaving the state almost defenseless. Curtis intended to press his invasion with the hope of reaching the capital city of Little Rock and knocking the state out of the war.

=== Confederate situation ===
The Confederate outlook in the spring of 1862 was grim. Most of its armed forces had been withdrawn from Arkansas and no commander with field experience remained. General John Selden Roane was put in charge of the remaining Arkansas forces.

== Maneuvering to battle ==
=== Union movements ===
General Curtis began his movement from northwest Arkansas in early April. He moved his 17,000-man army back into Missouri to take advantage of better transportation routes and headed east. He established his base of supply at Rolla, Missouri. Curtis reached West Plains, Missouri on April 29 and turned southwards into Arkansas. In addition to his large force, Curtis was assigned an additional 5,000 men under Brigadier General Frederick Steele.

During the first part of May, Curtis and Steele encountered numerous logistical difficulties. Poor weather, difficult terrain, and lack of consistent resupply slowed their progress. But by May 9, Curtis' large, but ill-supplied, force had emerged from the Ozark foothills onto flat ground at Searcy. It was poised to strike deep into central Arkansas and seize Little Rock itself as soon as supplies were gathered. While encamped at Searcy, Curtis and overall commander Major General Henry W. Halleck began to correspond about the upcoming Federal administration of Little Rock.

=== Confederate movements ===
Confederate General Roane set to work immediately in cobbling together a defense to meet the approaching Union Army. Roane stopped elements of the 12th Texas Cavalry that were bound for the eastern theaters and ordered troops who had made it as far as Memphis, Tennessee to turn around. Some attempts at recruiting local volunteers were made, but with little success.

On May 10, Roane sent Texas cavalry as scouts to determine the federal position. The scouts encountered numerous refugees fleeing the Union Army. The refugees reported that the Union forces numbered about 30,000, mostly German immigrants. Roane had approximately 1,200 Texas horsemen to confront this force. He ordered cotton stores near Searcy destroyed, and Governor Henry Massey Rector prepared government offices for evacuation. Meanwhile, small advance parties from the Union Army clashed with the Texas scouts between Searcy and Little Rock, and a few Union casualties resulted.

By May 19, several companies of the Texas cavalry had reached Searcy Landing and awaited an opportunity to strike the overwhelming opponent.

== Battle ==
Union General Curtis continued to worry about logistical problems, as his supply line was unable to provide the necessities for his army. He ordered Colonel Peter J. Osterhaus to send a strong foraging party to nearby farms. It consisted of seven companies of mixed infantry and cavalry from the 17th Missouri Infantry and the 4th Missouri Cavalry. The forage party crossed the Little Red River and proceeded to two farms along Whitney's Lane.

Scouting parties reported the movement of these companies to Colonel Emory Rogers, commander of approximately 150 Texas cavalrymen and local volunteers. About 300 additional Confederate troops were on the way, but Rogers decided to attack even though he was outnumbered. He divided his forces into two groups of Texans and one of Arkansans and ordered a mounted charge down the lane.

The initial charge overran Company H of the 17th Missouri, which dissolved under fire and fled toward Company F, which was attempting to set up a defensive position in a treeline. The combined companies fought bravely for a few minutes, as more Confederates came up to press them. The untrained and undisciplined Texans and local volunteers attacked furiously, and in some cases apparently ignored Union soldiers' attempts to surrender. Within a short time, Company F had been routed as well.

Meanwhile, Company G of the 17th and some Union cavalry moved forward and traded volleys with the Confederate horsemen. Major Eugen Kielmansegge of the 4th Missouri Cavalry ordered the rest of the available Union troopers to charge the Confederates. Company C of the 4th Missouri Cavalry plowed into the attackers and managed to drive them back into the woods between the foraging detail and the rest of the Federal army. Other Federal cavalry continued to arrive at the position. Kielmansegge, having concentrated his forces, set up a defensive position and continued to exchange fire with the Confederates as they prepared for another attack.

Meanwhile, other companies of the 17th Missouri had heard firing from the base camp across the Little Red River and marched out to relieve the forage party. Confederate Major Rogers ordered his men to retreat to the southwest and most did, though the Arkansans and some Texans remained on the field and attacked the relief column before withdrawing. The 300 expected Confederate reinforcements arrived on the field just after the retreat had been sounded and joined in the withdrawal.

== Aftermath ==
The battle at Whitney's Lane had lasted one hour and resulted in 51 Union men killed or wounded and approximately 10 Confederate casualties. The 17th Missouri Infantry lost only 68 men during the entire war; nearly one third of those were at Whitney's Lane.

The battle was little more than a skirmish, but the psychological and strategic effects of the conflict were far more than was reflected by the number of casualties. For both Confederate soldiers and civilians in Arkansas, the battle provided a huge psychological lift at a critical time. Arkansas newspapers trumpeted the battle and praised its participants. These articles lifted the despair that had gripped the state and provided the Confederates with a new sense of optimism and hope.

Even though their losses were small compared to the size of their force, the results of the battle proved disheartening for the Union. Union troops were suffering from lack of supplies and some soldiers reportedly lost confidence in their officers. Within a few days, Confederate cavalry was harassing the Union supply line from the rear, making Union logistics problems even worse. Confederate theater commander Hindman also launched a clever disinformation campaign aimed at convincing the Union forces that new units were pouring into Little Rock from Texas.

By May 31, Curtis began to rethink his position in the face of the Confederate activity. On June 2, Curtis held a council of war, and the Federal commanders agreed to a retreat toward the Ozark foothills. By the end of June, Curtis had abandoned his campaign against Little Rock entirely and moved to Helena, Arkansas to establish a new supply line at the Mississippi River.

== Sources ==
- Shea, William L. and Earl J. Hess. Pea Ridge: Civil War Campaign in the West. Chapel Hill: University of North Carolina Press, 1992. ISBN 0-8078-4669-4. (pbk.)
