= Battery K, 2nd Illinois Light Artillery Regiment =

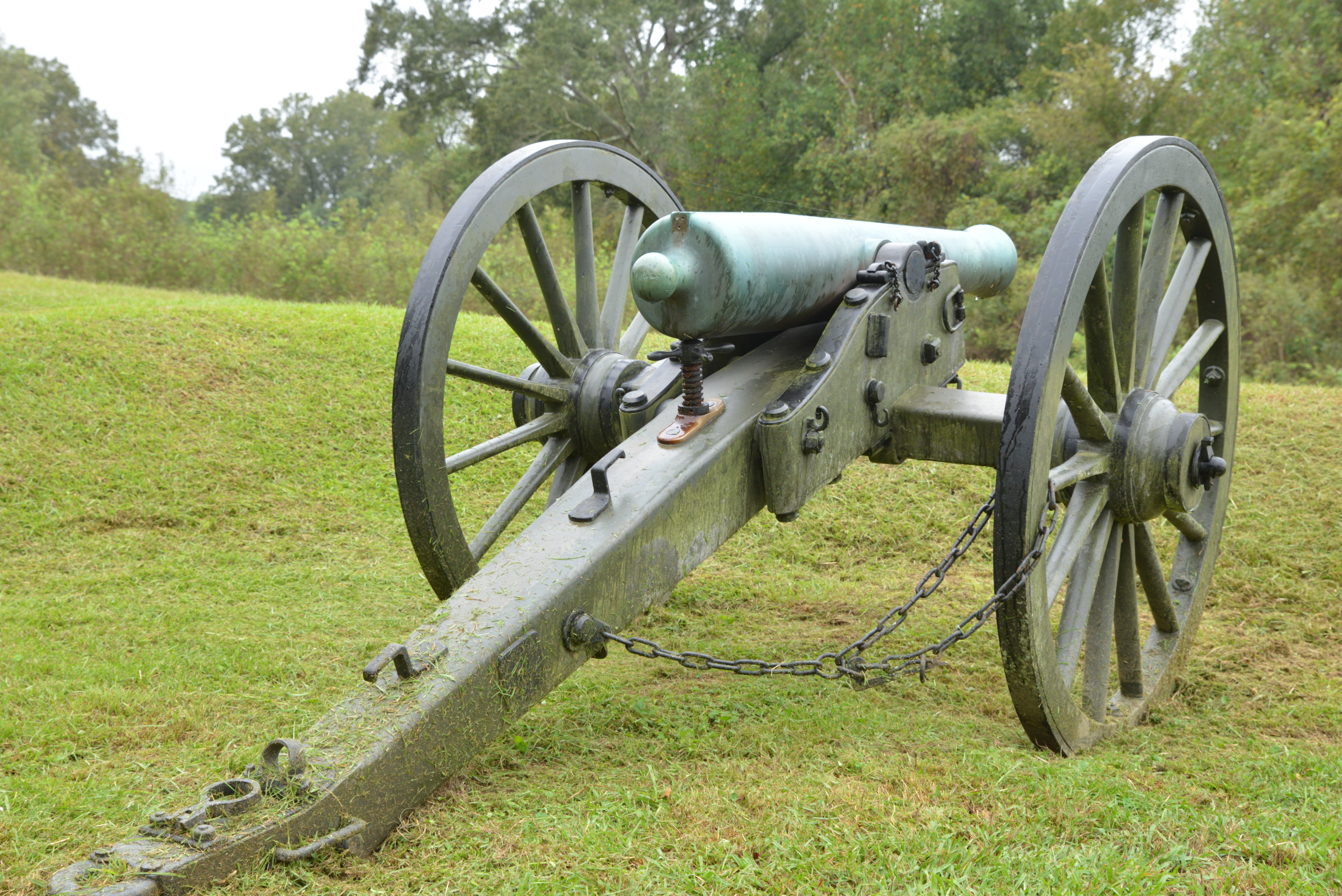
- Battery K served at the Siege of Vicksburg. A cannon from Vicksburg National Military Park is shown.
- Active: 31 Dec. 1861 – 14 July 1865
- Country: United States
- Allegiance: (United States) Union; Illinois
- Branch: Union Army
- Type: Field Artillery
- Size: Artillery Battery
- Engagements: American Civil War; Central Mississippi campaign (1862); Siege of Vicksburg (1863); Jackson Expedition (1863); Battle of Egypt Station (1864)

Commanders
- Notable commanders: Benjamin F. Rodgers; Thomas C. Barber

Battery K, 2nd Illinois Light Artillery Regiment was an artillery battery from Illinois that served in the Union Army during the American Civil War. The battery was organized in December 1861 at Springfield, Illinois. The unit performed occupation duties until November 1862 when it participated in Ulysses S. Grant's Central Mississippi campaign. The battery served during the Siege of Vicksburg and Jackson Expedition in 1863. For the remainder of the war, the unit was assigned more occupation duties before being mustered out in July 1865.

== History ==
=== Organization ===
Organized at Camp Butler, Ill., and mustered in on December 31, 1861. Moved to Cairo, Ill., February 7, 1862, thence to Columbus, Ky., March, 1862. Attached to District of Columbus, Ky., to November, 1862. District of Columbus, Ky., 13th Army Corps (Old), Dept. of the Tennessee, November, 1862. Artillery, 4th Division, Right Wing 13th Army Corps, to December, 1862. Artillery, 4th Division, 17th Army Corps, to January, 1863. Artillery, 4th Division, 16th Army Corps, to July, 1863. Artillery, 4th Division, 13th Army Corps, to August, 1863. Artillery, 4th Division, 17th Army Corps, August, 1863. Post of Natchez, Miss., to October, 1864. Artillery, Cavalry Division, District of West Tennessee, to February, 1865. Unattached Artillery, District of West Tennessee, to July, 1865.

=== Service ===
Duty at Columbus, Ky., until June, 1862, and at Memphis, Tenn., until August. (1 Section to Fort Pillow, Tenn., June, 1862.) Return to Columbus, Ky., August. Duty there and at New Madrid, Mo., until November. Expedition from New Madrid to Clarkston, Mo., October. Actions at Clarkston, Mo., October 23 and 28. Moved to Memphis, Tenn., November, 1862. Grant's Central Mississippi Campaign November, 1862, to January, 1863. Duty on Memphis & Charleston R. R. until February, 1863, and at Memphis, Tenn., until May, 1863. Ordered to Vicksburg, Miss., May 13. Siege of Vicksburg May 22-July 4. Advance on Jackson, Miss., July 5–10. Siege of Jackson July 10–17. Assault on Jackson July 12. Moved to Natchez, Miss., August 20, and garrison duty there until October, 1864. Expedition from Natchez to Gillespie's Plantation, La., August 4–6, 1864. Expedition from Natchez to Woodville October 4–11 (Section). Action at Woodville October 5–6 (Section). Ordered to Vicksburg, Miss., October, 1864, and mounted. Expedition to Yazoo City November 26-December 4. Ordered to Memphis, Tenn., arriving December 11. Grierson's raid on Mobile & Ohio R. R. December 21, 1864 – January 15, 1865. Egypt Station December 28. Duty at Memphis until July, 1865. Moved to Chicago, Ill., July 6–11. Mustered out July 14, 1865.

Battery lost during service 1 Officer and 10 Enlisted men by disease. Total 11.

== See also ==
- List of Illinois Civil War units
