= Elias Smith Dennis =

American politician

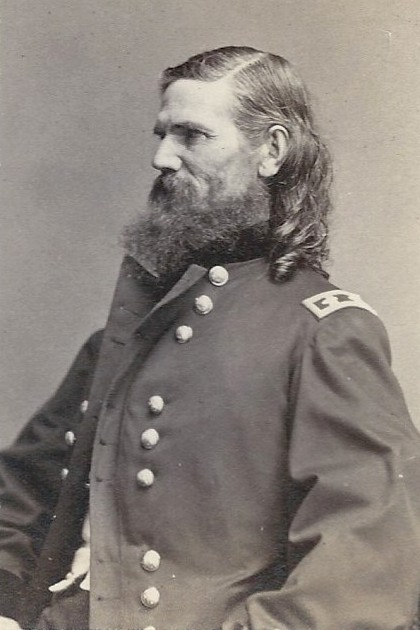
- Bvt. Maj. Gen. Elias S. Dennis
- Born: December 4, 1812; Newburgh, New York, US
- Died: December 17, 1894 (aged 82); Carlyle, Illinois, US
- Burial place: Carlyle Cemetery, Carlyle, Illinois
- Military career
- Allegiance: United States; Union
- Branch: United States Army; Union Army
- Service years: 1861–1866
- Rank: Brigadier General; Brevet Major General
- Commands: District of Northeastern Louisiana
- Conflicts: American Civil War; Battle of Fort Donelson; Battle of Fort Henry; Battle of Britton's Lane; Vicksburg Campaign; Battle of Port Gibson; Battle of Raymond; Battle of Milliken's Bend
- Other work: Illinois State Politician, Judge, Sheriff

Elias Smith Dennis (December 4, 1812 – December 17, 1894) was a politician and soldier from the state of Illinois who served as a general in the Union Army during the American Civil War.

== Early life and career ==
Dennis was born in Newburgh, New York, and grew up on Long Island. He moved to Carlyle, Illinois, in 1836. He married Mary Kain Slade, widow of Illinois Congressman Charles Slade. Charles Slades´ three sons would become Dennis' stepsons. William Slade fought as a lieutenant in the U.S. Mexican War; Charles Slade, who married one of Sidney Breese's daughters, died in war and Jack Slade was a famous gunfighter who was hung by Montana vigilanties in 1864. Elias S Dennis had one son with Mary, Elias S. Dennis Jr.

Dennis served in the Illinois House of Representatives from 1842 to 1844 and was an Illinois State Senator from 1846 to 1848. Elias was appointed Kansas Territory Marshal for the Leavenworth, Kansas area March 12, 1857 by President Buchanan. The announcement of his appointment was published in "The New York Herald" New York, NY May 11, 1857 pg. 8, col B. .........". In politics he has always been an unwavering national democrat. In person he is rather tall, well made, with dark hair, and a most determined cast of countenance; he speaks but little, but is kind, though rather reserved in his manner. Mr. Dennis did not seek the office which he now holds, in fact, the first intimation that he had of his appointment was through the medium of a telegraphic dispatch from a Western member of Congress in Washington, announcing the fact. We believe him to have a sincere desire to do his duty and so long as he continues a conservative, will have our best wishes for his success."

Elias was dismissed from his duties as the Kansas Territory Marshal March 1, 1858. "The New York Herald" New York, NY Apr 17, 1858; p. 8, col 3. "When Senator Douglas ascertained that Dennis had been dismissed because he had testified against the Border Ruffian frauds, he moved & reconsideration of the vote of confirmation. Oligarchic Senators said no! never ! and Free State serviles submitted. The Senate voted 27 for—20 against Douglas's motion. Mr. Dennis is a Democrat, and his sole offence was telling the truth before the investigation committee of the Territorial Legislature. He has, however, only me the fate of all the Democrats sent to Kansas, who have flinched, in the slightest degree, in upholding the rascalities of the Pro-Slavery party.

== Civil War service ==
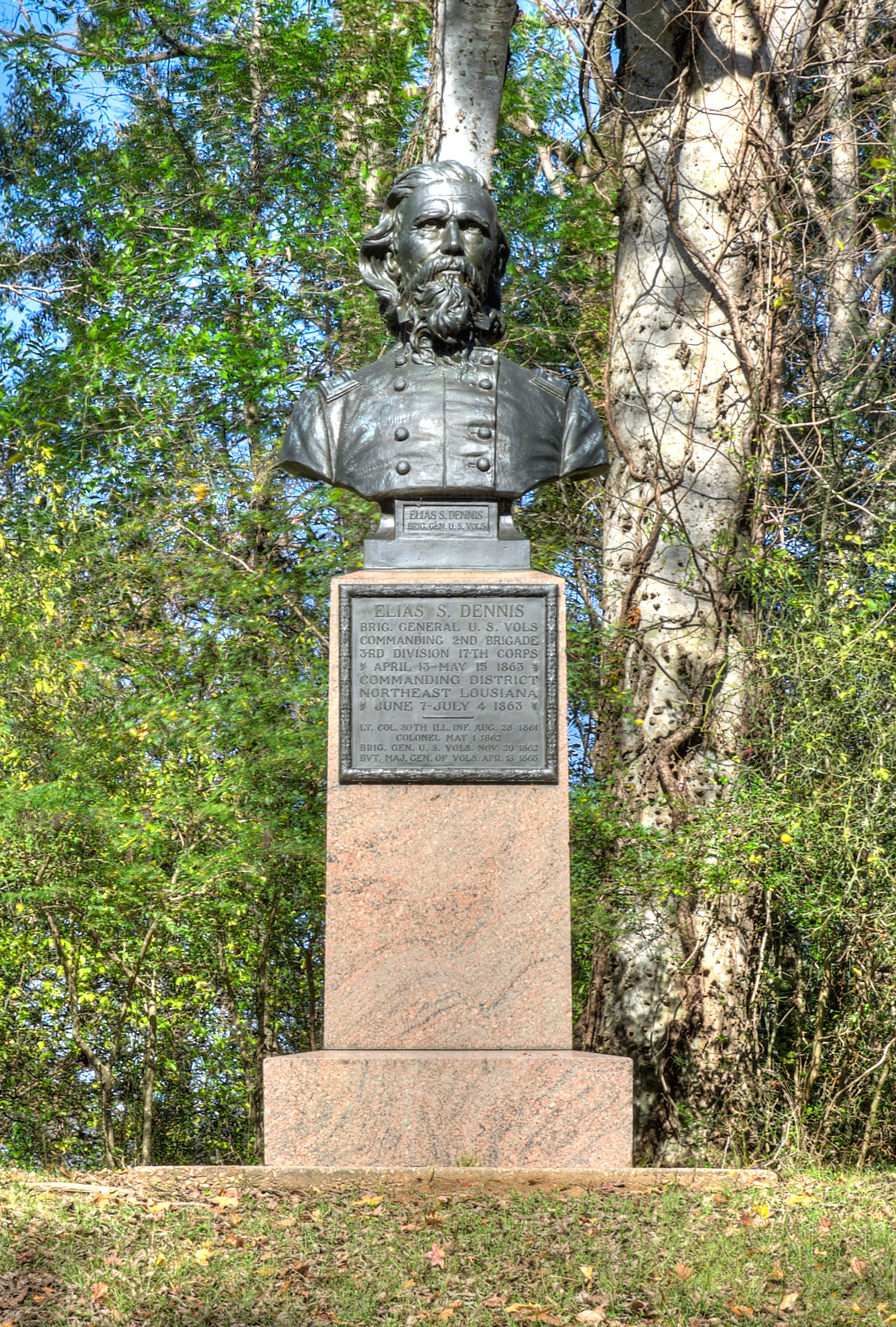
Bust of Dennis by George Brewster at Vicksburg National Military Park

When the war began, Dennis was selected as the lieutenant colonel of the 30th Illinois Infantry. He participated in the capture of Fort Donelson, Tennessee. He was promoted to colonel in May 1862 and to brigadier general in November 1862, commanding a brigade of infantry in the Army of the Tennessee.

During the 1863 Vicksburg Campaign, he was accused of selling army provisions to the Confederates near Vicksburg while his own men were underfed. In April 1863, he fought in the Battle of Port Gibson and in May 1863, at the Battle of Raymond. Later in May, he was placed in command of the District of Northeast Louisiana when guerillas were causing problems on the leased plantations there. Troops from his command participated in the Battle of Milliken's Bend in June, one of the first battles to involve United States Colored Troops.

He served as the commanding officer of the Union militia in Louisiana until the end of the war. Dennis was mustered out of the volunteer army on August 24, 1865. On January 13, 1866, President Andrew Johnson nominated Dennis to receive the brevet grade of major general, to rank from April 13, 1865, and the U.S. Senate confirmed the nomination on March 12, 1866.

== Postbellum career ==
He was a parish judge and sheriff in Louisiana after the war. Mary Slade Dennis was granted a divorce from Elias Dennis 14 November 1871 (Mary died 15 January 1873). On June 7, 1875, Elias married Mrs. Mary A, McFarland of Madison Parish, who owned a plantation. Dennis moved back to Carlyle, Illinois, in March 1887 and lived on a small farm with his son Elias Jr.

He died from pneumonia in Carlyle, Illinois in 1894 and was buried in the City Cemetery.

A bronze bust of Dennis was erected in 1915 on the Vicksburg National Military Park.

== See also ==
- List of American Civil War generals (Union)
