= Carroll Parish, Louisiana =

Former parish of Louisiana, United States

Carroll Parish is a former parish of Louisiana, formed in 1838 from part of Ouachita Parish. Part of the parish was sectioned off in 1844 to make Morehouse Parish. Carroll Parish was divided in 1877 into East Carroll Parish and West Carroll Parish.

During and shortly after the Reconstruction era, Carroll Parish's representatives in the Louisiana House of Representatives included P. Jones Yorke and Cain Sartain, Republicans.
