= 4th Missouri Cavalry Regiment =

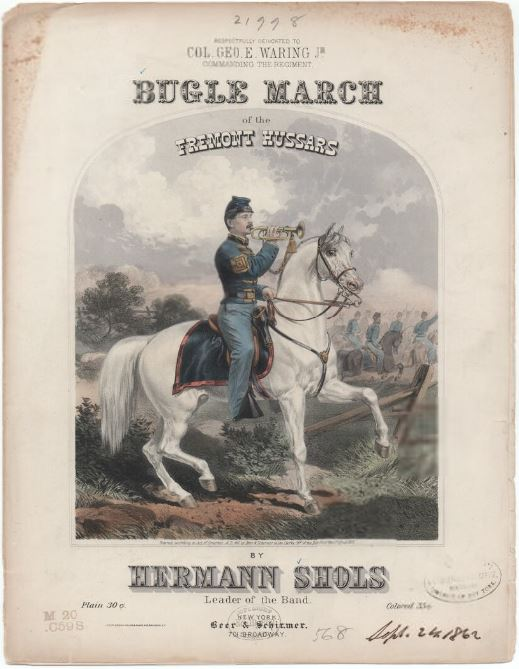
- Mounted bugler of the Fremont Hussars
- Active: Feb. 1862 – Nov. 13, 1865
- Country: United States
- Allegiance: Union
- Branch: Cavalry
- Engagements: Battle of Pea Ridge (Companies E & F); Battle of Whitney's Lane; Battle of Iuka (Company C); Second Battle of Corinth (Company C); Battle of Raymond (Company F); Battle of Jackson (Company F); Battle of Champion Hill (Company F); Siege of Vicksburg (Company F); Battle of Little Blue River; Battle of Byram's Ford; Battle of Westport (detachment); Battle of Marais des Cygnes; Battle of Marmiton River; Battle of Mine Creek (detachment); Battle of Egypt Station

The 4th Missouri Cavalry Regiment, also known as the Fremont Hussars, was a cavalry regiment that served in the Union Army during the American Civil War. Elements of the regiment fought at Pea Ridge, Whitney's Lane, Little Blue River, Byram's Ford, Westport, Marais des Cygnes, Marmiton River, and Mine Creek. Company C served at Iuka and Corinth while Company F was at Raymond, Jackson, Champion Hill, and Vicksburg.

== Service ==
The 4th Missouri Cavalry Regiment was organized in February 1862 and mustered in for three years by consolidation of the Fremont Hussars and three companies of the Hollan Horse. The regiment was mustered in under the command of Colonel George E. Waring, Jr.

The regiment was attached to 3rd Brigade, Army of Southwest Missouri, Department of Missouri, to March 1862. Cavalry, 2nd Division, Army of Southwest Missouri, Department of Missouri, to May 1862. Cavalry, 3rd Division, Army of Southwest Missouri, to July 1862. District of Eastern Arkansas, Department of Missouri, to October 1862. Cavalry Brigade, Army of Southeast Missouri, Department of Missouri, until April 1863. District of Columbus, Kentucky, 6th Division, XVI Corps, Department of the Tennessee, to December 1863. Waring's Detached Brigade, District of Columbus, to January 1864. 1st Brigade, 1st Cavalry Division, XVI Corps, to June 1864. 1st Brigade, Cavalry Division, Sturgis' Expedition, June 1864. 1st Brigade, 2nd Cavalry Division, District of West Tennessee, to December 1864. 1st Brigade, Cavalry Division, District of West Tennessee, to June 1865. 2nd Brigade, 2nd Division Cavalry Corps, Military Division West Mississippi, and Department of Texas to November 1865.

The 4th Missouri Cavalry mustered out of service on November 13, 1865.

== Detailed service ==
- Curtis' Campaign in Missouri and Arkansas January to April 1862.
- Occupation of Springfield, Mo., February 14.
- Pierson's and Crane's Creeks February 14.
- Flat Creek February 15.
- Cross Timbers February 16.
- Sugar Creek, Ark., February 17.
- Bentonville February 19.
- Occupation of Fayetteville February 23.
- Scout through LaClede, Wright and Douglass Counties, Mo., March 1–11 (Company F).
- Battles of Pea Ridge, Ark., March 6–8; Fox Creek March 7 (Companies E and F); Mountain Grove March 9 (Companies E and F).
- March to Keitsville, thence to Forsyth March 19-April 10.
- Forsyth April 11.
- March to White Plains and Batesville April 15-May 3.
- Batesville May 3.
- Little Red River May 17 (detachment).
- Scout to Grand Glaze May 14.
- Searcy Landing, Little Red River, May 19.
- Expedition from Searcy Landing to West Point, Searcy and Des Arc May 27.
- Searcy May 27.
- Expedition to Grand Glaze May 31 (detachment).
- Scouts from Batesville June 16–17.
- March to Helena July 5–14.
- Round Hill July 7.
- Occupation of Helena until October.
- Expedition from Clarendon to Lawrenceville and St.
- Charles September 11–13.
- Battle of Iuka, Miss., September 19 (Company C).
- Expedition to LaGrange September 26 (detachment).
- Moved with Davidson to southeast Missouri and operations against Marmaduke October 1862 to May 1863.
- Battle of Corinth, Miss., October 3–4, 1862 (Company C).
- Grant's Central Mississippi Campaign October 31, 1862, to January 10, 1863 (Company C).
- Batesville, Ark., February 4, 1863.
- Moved to Columbus, Ky., May 1863, and duty there until January 1864.
- (Raymond, Miss., May 12, 1863 (Company F); Jackson, Miss., May 14 (Company F); Champion Hill, Miss., May 16 (Company F).) Siege of Vicksburg, Miss., May 18-July 4, 1863 (Company F).
- Near Lexington, Tenn., June 29, 1863 (detachment).
- Union City, Tenn., July 10 (Companies C and E).
- Occupation of Hickman, Ky., July 15–16.
- Expedition from Clifton in pursuit of Biffle's, Forest's and Newsome's Cavalry July 22–27.
- Expedition from Columbus to Hickman, Ky., August 1 (1 company).
- Scout from Fort Pillow, Tenn., August 3 (detachment).
- Expedition from Union City to Conyersville September 1–10.
- Conyersville September 5.
- Como September 19.
- Expedition from Paducah, Ky., to McLemoresville, Tenn., September 20–30.
- Pillowville November 5.
- Attack on Bloomfield, Mo., November 29–30.
- Expedition from Union City to Trenton January 22–24, 1864.
- Smith's Expedition from Colliersville, Tenn., to Okolona, Miss., February 11–26.
- Prairie Station February 20.
- Okolona February 21.
- Ivy's Hill, near Okolona, February 22.
- Operations against Forrest in western Tennessee March 16-April 14.
- Sturgis' Expedition from Memphis, Tenn., to Ripley, Miss., April 30-May 9.
- Near Mt. Pleasant May 22 (detachment).
- Holly Springs, Miss., May 24.
- Sturgis' Expedition to Guntown, Miss., June 1–13.
- Brice's or Tishamingo Creek, near Guntown, June 10.
- Ripley and Salem June 11.
- Expedition to Grand Gulf, Miss., July 4–24.
- Grand Gulf July 16.
- Smith's Expedition from Lagrange, Tenn., to Oxford, Miss., August 1–30.
- Operations against Price in Missouri September–October.
- Little Blue, Mo., October 21.
- Big Blue and State Line October 22.
- Westport October 23.
- Engagement at the Marmiton or battle of Charlot October 25.
- Mine Creek, Osage River, Marias Des Cygnes, October 25.
- Grierson's Expedition to destroy Mobile & Ohio Railroad December 21, 1864, to January 15, 1865.
- Verona December 25.
- Egypt Station December 28.
- At Memphis and along Memphis & Charleston Railroad until June 1865.
- Moved to Alexandria, then to Shreveport, La.
- Moved to Texas July 10-August 2.
- Garrison duty at San Antonio and scouting along the Rio Grande, Texas, until November 1865.

== Casualties ==
The regiment lost a total of 243 men during service; 4 officers and 56 enlisted men killed or mortally wounded, 6 officers and 177 enlisted men died of disease.

== Commanders ==
- Colonel George E. Waring, Jr.
- Major Emeric Meszaros - commanded detachment at the battle of Pea Ridge
- Captain Charles D. Knispel - commanded detachment at the battles of Westport and Mine Creek; detachment was combined with the 7th Indiana Cavalry

== See also ==
- Missouri Civil War Union units
- Missouri in the Civil War
