= Battle of Britton's Lane =

Battle of the American Civil War

Coordinates: 35.490°N 88.958°W

- Part of the American Civil War
Date	September 1, 1862
Location	Madison County, Tennessee
Result	Confederate victory

Belligerents
United States (Union)	Confederate States

Commanders and leaders
Elias S. Dennis	Frank C. Armstrong

Strength
2 Cavalry troops 2 Infantry regiments Artillery battery	Cavalry brigade

Casualties and losses
8 killed ~50 wounded 213 captured	75 killed or wounded

The Battle of Britton's Lane occurred September 1, 1862, near the village of Denmark in rural Madison County, Tennessee, during the American Civil War.

Ordered to raid north from Mississippi by Maj. Gen. Sterling Price, commanding the Army of the West, thus to prevent Ulysses S. Grant's reinforcing Maj. Gen. Don Carlos Buell in Tennessee, Brig. Gen. Frank C. Armstrong's cavalry brigade struck Col. Elias S. Dennis's Federal force of two cavalry troops, a battery and two infantry regiments. After four hours, in which they suffered heavy losses while taking 213 prisoners and two field pieces, the raiders withdrew, their mission accomplished.
