= William Wirt Adams =

Confederate States Army general (1819–1888)

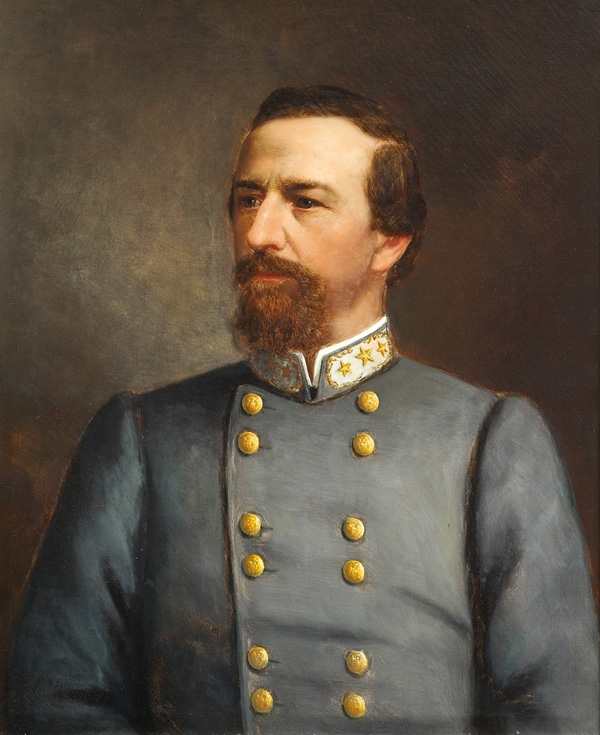
- Portrait, 1904
- Born: March 22, 1819; Frankfort, Kentucky, U.S.
- Died: May 1, 1888 (aged 69); Jackson, Mississippi, U.S.
- Burial place: Greenwood Cemetery, Jackson, Mississippi, U.S.
- Education: Bardstown College
- Spouse: Sally Mayrant
- Relatives: George Adams (father); Anna Weisiger (mother); Daniel Adams (brother)
- Military career
- Allegiance: Republic of Texas; Confederate States
- Branch: Texas militia Confederate States Army
- Service years: 1839 (militia); 1861–1865 (C.S.)
- Rank: Captain (militia); Brigadier General (C.S.)
- Nickname: "Wirt"
- Commands: Adams' Mississippi Cavalry Regiment; Adams' Brigade
- Battles: American Civil War; Battle of Shiloh; Siege of Corinth; Battle of Iuka; Battle of Hatchie's Bridge; Battle of Raymond; Battle of Champion Hill; Siege of Port Hudson; Battle of Meridian

William Wirt Adams (March 22, 1819 – May 1, 1888) was a senior officer of the Confederate States Army who commanded cavalry in the Western Theater of the American Civil War.

== Early life and education ==
Adams was born in Frankfort, Kentucky, to Anna Weisiger Adams and Judge George Adams (a personal friend to American statesman and orator Henry Clay). He was a brother of Daniel Weisiger Adams, another future Civil War general. In 1825 his family moved to and settled in Natchez, Mississippi. His father was a district court judge for Mississippi from 1836 to 1839.

Adams attended college at Bardstown College in Bardstown, Kentucky. Upon graduation in 1839, he relocated to the Republic of Texas where he enlisted as a private in the Texas militia under Edward Burleson. Appointed regimental adjutant, he participated in the Indian Wars.

Adams returned to Mississippi where he married Sallie Huger Mayarant in 1850. There he pursued banking and agriculture in Jackson, Mississippi, and Vicksburg, Mississippi. From 1850 to 1861, he owned and operated a successful business and, from 1858 to 1860, he served two sessions in the Mississippi House of Representatives.

== American Civil War ==
In 1861, after Mississippi seceded from the Union, Adams was appointed commissioner from Mississippi to Louisiana. As such, he helped the latter to secede from the Union. In February of that year, the Confederate States was established in Montgomery, Alabama. President Jefferson Davis offered Adams a cabinet position there as Confederate Postmaster General, but he declined.

After settling his banking interests, he organized and mustered the Adams' Mississippi Cavalry Regiment into the Confederate service at Memphis, Tennessee, in August 1861. Later, in September, his command was ordered to Columbus, Kentucky, and then, in October, to Headquarters, General Albert Sidney Johnston, Bowling Green, Kentucky. Adams was promoted to Colonel in October 1861. From there they fought a rear-guard action in the Confederate retreat from Kentucky to Nashville, Tennessee, and subsequently to Corinth, Mississippi.

Later, at the Battle of Shiloh, they were positioned on the extreme right flank of the infantry and fought with it near the Tennessee River at Greer's Ford. Then they were on outpost duty during the Siege of Corinth. Later, four of the regiment's companies aggressively attacked and pursued Union Army elements for two miles, near Booneville, Mississippi.

Adams' Regiment fought at the Battle of Iuka and the Second Battle of Corinth, as part of Brig. Gen. Frank Crawford Armstrong's cavalry brigade in Maj. Gen. Sterling Price's Corps. They covered the Army's retreat after Confederates failed to retake Corinth. His orders next took his regiment to Washington County, Mississippi. There he guarded local plantations and observed troop movements in and around Vicksburg, Mississippi. After the fall of Vicksburg, both his regiment and the 28th Mississippi Cavalry harassed and skirmished units under General William Tecumseh Sherman who were advancing on Confederate-held positions.

Commissioned as brigadier general in September 1863, Adams was assigned command of a brigade composed of both his regiment and the command of Colonel Logan. In February 1864, he was ordered to attack General Sherman's advance on Meridian, Mississippi. Near the end of the war, he operated alongside General Nathan Bedford Forrest in Alabama. He and his brigade surrendered near Ramsey Station, Sumter County, Alabama, on May 4, 1865. His farewell address was delivered to his command two days later. His parole is dated Gainesville, Alabama, May 12, 1865.

== Later life and death ==
Upon the conclusion of the Civil War, Adams resided in Vicksburg and Jackson, Mississippi. In 1880, he was appointed as a Mississippi state revenue agent. He resigned in 1885 and took the position of postmaster in Jackson by appointment of President Grover Cleveland. In 1882, Adams became the president of the Gulf and Ship Island Railroad, a venture he was involved in until his death.

In 1888, Adams was made the target of a number of attacks by the editor of the New Mississippian, John H. Martin, a staunch prohibitionist and reform advocate. Adams was rebuked by Martin for, among other things, his role as a character witness in the murder trial of Colonel Jones S. Hamilton, who was ultimately acquitted for killing Roderick D. Gambrell, another newspaper editor and ally of Martin's, in a street duel. On May 1, 1888, Adams, walking on President Street in Jackson with another man, encountered Martin coming from the opposite direction near the corner of Amite Street. After a brief verbal altercation, both men pulled revolvers on each other, Adams firing three times and Martin six. Both died almost immediately with Adams shot through the heart and Martin in the chest, leg, and hand. He was buried in Greenwood Cemetery in Jackson.

== Controversies ==
The photographic portrait of William Wirt Adams in Era Warner's "Generals in Gray" is incorrect. It is that of his brother Daniel Weisiger Adams.

== See also ==
- List of Confederate States Army generals
