= 2nd New Jersey Cavalry Regiment =

- Active: August 13, 1863 – November 1, 1865
- Country: United States of America
- Allegiance: Union
- Branch: Cavalry
- Engagements: Battle of Okolona (1864); Battle of Brices Cross Roads (1864); Battle of Egypt Station (1864); Battle of Spanish Fort (1865); Battle of Fort Blakeley (1865)

The 2nd New Jersey Cavalry Regiment was a cavalry regiment that served in the Union Army during the American Civil War.

== Service ==
The 2nd New Jersey Cavalry Regiment was organized at Camp Parker in Trenton, New Jersey and mustered in on August 13, 1863, under the command of Colonel Joseph Kargé.

The regiment was attached to Stoneman's Cavalry Division, XXII Corps, Department of Washington, to December 1863. District of Columbus, Kentucky, 6th Division, XVI Corps, Department of the Tennessee, to December 1863. Waring's Cavalry Brigade, XVI Corps, to January 1864. 1st Brigade, 1st Cavalry Division, XVII Corps, to June 1864. 1st Brigade, 2nd Division, Cavalry Corps, District of West Tennessee, to November 1864. 2nd Brigade, 6th Division, Cavalry Corps, Military Division Mississippi, to December 1864. 1st Brigade, Cavalry Division, District of West Tennessee, to February 1865. 1st Brigade, 1st Cavalry Division, Military Division West Mississippi, to April 1865. 2nd Brigade, Cavalry Division, Department of the Gulf, to May 1865. Department of the Mississippi to November 1865.

The 2nd New Jersey Cavalry mustered out November 1, 1865 at Vicksburg, Mississippi.

== Detailed service ==
Left New Jersey for Washington, D.C., October 5, 1863. In camp near Alexandria, Va. until November 9, 1863. Scout to Annandale October 18 (Companies B, C, G, and L). Moved to Eastport, Ms. November 9–28; then to Columbus, Ky., December 6, to Union City, Tn December 15. Garrison and scout duty at Paris, Tn. December 23, 1863, to January 16, 1864. Moved to Union City January 16–20. Expedition from Union City to Trenton January 22–27. Marched from Union City to Memphis and Colliersville, Tn. January 28 – February 8. Smith's Expedition to Okolona, Miss., February 11–26. Aberdeen, Ms. February 19. Prairie Station February 20. West Point February 20–21. Okolona February 21–22. Ivy's Farm February 22. Tallahatchie River February 23. Operations against Forrest in West Tennessee and Kentucky March 16 – April 14. Near Memphis April 5 and Raleigh April 10. Sturgis' Expedition to Ripley, Miss., April 30 – May 9. Bolivar, Tenn., May 2. Holly Springs May 23. Sturgis' Expedition to Guntown June 1–13. Brice's Cross Roads or Tishamingo Creek, near Guntown, June 10. Ripley June 11. Duty on Memphis & Charleston Railroad between Moscow and LaGrange June 25 – July 5. Expedition from Memphis to Grand Gulf, Miss., July 4–24 (detachment). Moved to Vicksburg, Miss., July 5–6. Port Gibson July 14. Grand Gulf July 15–16. Smith's Expedition to Oxford, Miss., August 1–30. Hurricane Creek and Oxford August 9. Tallahatchie River August 14. Waterford August 19. Duty at Memphis, Tenn., August 31, 1864 to December 20, 1864. Hernando October 15. Yazoo City December 2. Chickasawba Bridge December 10. Grierson's Raid to destroy the Mobile & Ohio Railroad December 20, 1864 to January 15, 1865. Verona December 25. Part of the 1st Brigade of Brig. Gen. Benjamin Grierson's Cavalry Division at the Egypt Station December 28. Moved to Natchez, Miss., January 19, and duty there until March 4. Moved to New Orleans, La., and camp at Carrollton until April 5. Moved to Mobile, Ala., April 5. Spanish Fort April 8. Fort Blakely April. Expedition from Blakely, Ala., to Georgetown, Ga., April 17–30. Moved to Columbus, Miss., and duty there until June 7. Moved to Vicksburg June 7. Duty there and at Natchez, Port Gibson and Brookhaven until November.

== Casualties ==
The regiment lost a total of 241 men during service; 3 officers and 48 enlisted men killed or mortally wounded, 190 enlisted men died of disease.

== Commanders ==
- Colonel Joseph Kargé

== See also ==
- List of New Jersey Civil War units
- New Jersey in the American Civil War
