= 7th Indiana Cavalry Regiment =

7th Indiana Cavalry Regiment 119th Indiana Infantry Regiment
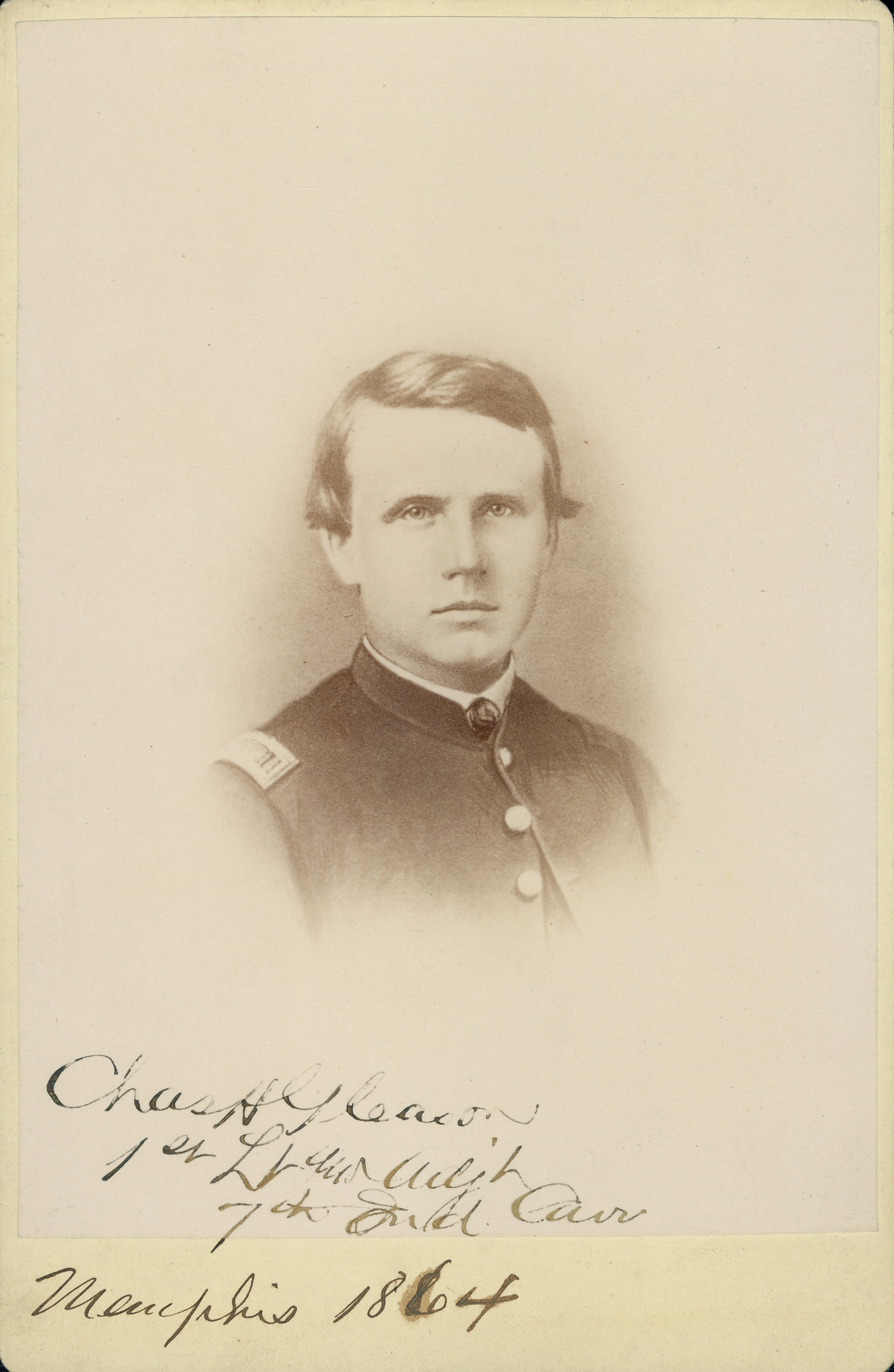
- Portrait of 1st Lieutenant Charles H. Gleason, Adjutant of the 7th Indiana Cavalry Regiment.
- Active: February 22, 1863 – February 18, 1866
- Country: United States
- Allegiance: Union
- Branch: Cavalry
- Engagements: Battle of Brice's Crossroads; Battle of Little Blue River; Second Battle of Independence; Battle of Byram's Ford; Battle of Westport; Battle of Marais des Cygnes; Battle of Mine Creek; Battle of Marmiton River; Battle of Egypt Station

Commanders
- Notable commanders: John Peter Cleaver Shanks; Thomas M. Browne

The 7th Indiana Cavalry Regiment was a cavalry regiment that served in the Union Army during the American Civil War. The regiment was originally mustered as infantry and designated as the 119th Indiana Infantry Regiment before being redesignated as the 7th Indiana Cavalry Regiment.

== Service ==
The 7th Indiana Cavalry was organized at Indianapolis, Indiana, beginning February 22, 1863, and mustered on October 1, 1863, for three years service.

The regiment was attached to District of Columbus, Kentucky, 6th Division, XVI Corps, Army of the Tennessee, December 1863. Waring's Cavalry Brigade, XVI Corps, to January 1864. 1st Brigade, 1st Cavalry Division, XVI Corps, to June 1864. 1st Brigade, 2nd Cavalry Division, District of West Tennessee, to November 1864. 2nd Brigade, Wilson's Cavalry Corps, Military Division of Mississippi, to December 1864. 1st Brigade, Cavalry Division, District of West Tennessee, to June 1865. Department of Texas to February 1866.

The 7th Indiana Cavalry mustered out of service at Austin, Texas, on February 18, 1866.

== Detailed service ==
The 7th Regiment left Indiana for Union City, Tennessee, on December 6, 1863. It then conducted an expedition to Paris, Tennessee, from December 14 to December 23, 1863. It saw action at Huntington, Tennessee, on December 27.

Subsequent activity is as follows:

January 22–24, 1864: Its first expedition was from Union City to Trenton, Tennessee

February 6: Bolivar (detachment).

February 11–26: Part of Smith's Expedition to Okolona, Mississippi

February 20–21: West Point

February 21–22: Okolona

February 22: Ivey's Hill

February 25: Hudsonville: The Regiment was complimented by Generals Smith and Grierson for soldierly bearing and conduct during the expedition.

April 3: Near Raleigh, Tennessee

April 8: Wolf River

April 9: Near Raleigh (detachment).

April 10: Cypress Swamp

April 30-May 9: Sturgis' Expedition to Ripley, Mississippi

June 1–13: Sturgis' Expedition to Guntown, Mississippi

June 7: Ripley

June 10: Brice's Crossroads, near Guntown

June 11: Ripley

June 20 and 26: White's Station

July 2: Byhalia Road, near Colliersville

July 17: Action at Port Gibson, Mississippi

July 19: Grand Gulf

August 1–30: Expedition to Oxford, Mississippi

August 7–9: Tallahatchie River

August 9, 13–14, and 19: Hurricane Creek

August 9 and 11: Oxford

August 14: Lamar

August 28: Colliersville

October 4: White Station

October 4: Near Memphis (1 company).

October 20 and 24: Memphis, Tennessee

October 29: Nonconah Creek (Company F).

September–November: March through Arkansas and Missouri in pursuit of Price

October 21: Action at Little Blue, Missouri

October 22: Independence

October 22: Big Blue and State Line

October 23: Westport

October 25: Mine Creek, Marias Des Cygnes

October 25: At the Marmiton

December 21, 1864 to January 15, 1865: Grierson's Expedition from Memphis to destroy Mobile & Ohio Railroad

December 25, 1864: Capture of Verona

December 28: Egypt Station

January 2, 1865: Lexington

until June: Duty at Memphis and along Memphis & Charleston Railroad

January 19–22: Expedition from Memphis to Marion, Arkansas (detachment).

March 3–11: Expedition from Memphis into northern Mississippi

June 6–16: Moved to Alexandria, Louisiana

July 21: Consolidated to six companies

August 5–26: It then marched to Hempstead, Texas

until February 1866: Duty there and at Austin, Texas

== Casualties ==
The regiment lost a total of 294 men during service; 1 officer and 47 enlisted men killed or mortally wounded, 3 officers and 243 enlisted men died of disease.

== Commanders ==
- Colonel John Peter Cleaver Shanks: October 9, 1863 - December 8, 1864.
- Thomas McLelland Browne: October 10, 1865 - February 18, 1866.
- Major Samuel Edminston W. Simonson: Commanded at the Battle of Westport and the Battle of Mine Creek.

== Notable people ==
- John P. C. Shanks.
- Thomas M. Browne.
- Edward E. Calkins.
- Joel Elliott.

== See also ==
- List of Indiana Civil War regiments
- Indiana in the Civil War
