= Lizzie Aiken =

American Civil War nurse

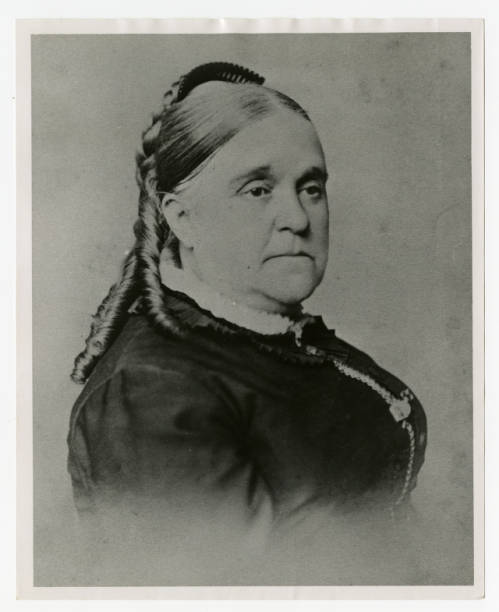
- Portrait of Lizzie Aiken
- Born: Eliza N. Atherton; March 24, 1817; Auburn, New York, US
- Died: January 17, 1906 (aged 88); Chicago, Illinois, US
- Burial place: Graceland Cemetery
- Other names: Lizzie Atherton, Aunt Lizzie
- Occupation: Nurse
- Spouse: Cyrus Aiken

Lizzie Aiken (1817–1906) was a nurse in the American Civil War, who was widely known as "Aunt Lizzie".

== Early life and family ==
Eliza Atherton, known as "Lizzie", was born in the town of Auburn, New York in 1817. The daughter of Steadman Atherton (1791-1856) and Deborah Ward. Both her parents were from Cavendish, Vermont.

In 1826, at the age of nine, the family returned to the Atherton Farmstead in Cavendish, which was owned by her grandfather, Jonathan Atherton.

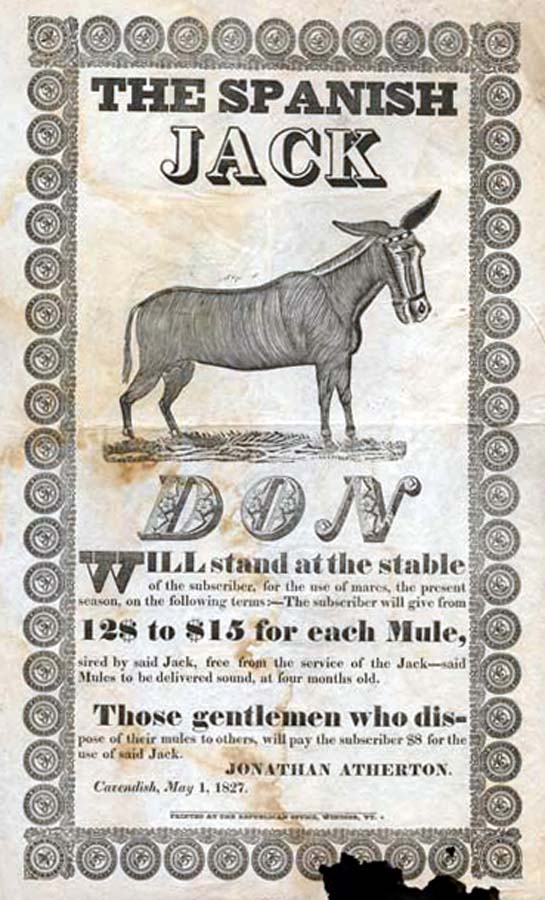

When she was sixteen, her mother became ill and Lizzie spent the next four years caring for her. Once her mother's health improved, she enrolled in the New England Academy in Cavendish.

== Personal life ==
In 1837, aged 20, she married Cyrus Aiken, nine years her senior, and they honeymooned in Boston.

Choosing to relocate to Grand Detour, Illinois, the journey would have involved travel by stage coach, navigating the Erie Canal and boarding a series of sailing vessels through the Great Lakes, first to Detroit, and onto Chicago, where they remained for a short time, until reaching the Rock River area of Illinois. This journey westwards involved much hardship, suffering and discomfort, particularly with the loss of her follow on shipment of personal heirlooms she had inherited from her grandmother, which sank to the bottom of Lake Erie.

She raised a young family, in a colony of other emigres from Vermont, including the blacksmith John Deere. A series of misfortunes occurred with an outbreak of Cholera, resulting in the loss of all four of her young boys in 1852. Her brother Ward and sister Roxy arrived to console her. Within eleven days her sister had succumbed to cholera.

Her father died in 1856. When her husband became mentally ill, she worked as a domestic nurse to help defray his medical expenses and help support her mother, who was living in Vermont. She also lost possession of their homestead. A while later her new home was destroyed after being struck by lightning.

Aiken was a deeply religious person and was an active member of her local baptist congregation.

== Civil War service ==
Aiken, now a widow, enlisted as a nurse with the 6th Illinois Cavalry Regiment at the beginning of the American Civil War. Serving under Austrian born, Dr John N. Niglas, she nursed soldiers in the sick tents near Peoria, Illinois.

In November 1861, she accompanied the 6th Illinois Cavalry to Shawnee Town, on the Ohio River. Her comfort and care resulted in the nickname "Aunt Lizzie". At first she worked for no pay but eventually received $12 per month from the Union Army.

In 1862, she wrote to a friend:

Twenty four nights in succession I have sat up until three in the morning dealing out medicine. I cannot think of leaving these poor fellows if there is any chance of their living. Dr. Niglas tells me I have saved the lives of over 400 men. I am afraid I hardly deserve that compliment. I cannot tell you how well this work suits this restless heart of mine.

In January 1862, she wrote to another friend as follows:

Quite a little incident took place yesterday; we, as nurses, were sworn into the United States service. Dr. Niglas tells me I have saved the lives of more than 400 men. I am afraid I hardly deserve the compliment. General Grant, General Sturgis and General Sherman paid us a visit. All join in saying that we excel all other hospitals in being attentive to our sick and in cleanliness. They suggested my going to Cairo. Dr. Niglas spurned the proposition, and I did too. I cannot tell you how well this work suits this restless heart of mine; my great desire to do something to benefit my fellow creatures is gratified in my present occupation.

She would later care for Union soldiers at Ovington Hospital in Memphis, Tennessee. She was friends with Mary A. "Mother" Sturges.

In 1864, the ladies of the Peoria Loyal League raised the money so she could visit her mother in Cavendish for three weeks.

Aiken became sick and returned to Peoria where she was nursed back to health. In 1867, she joined the Second Baptist Church and worked as missionary until her death in 1906.

== Honors and tributes ==
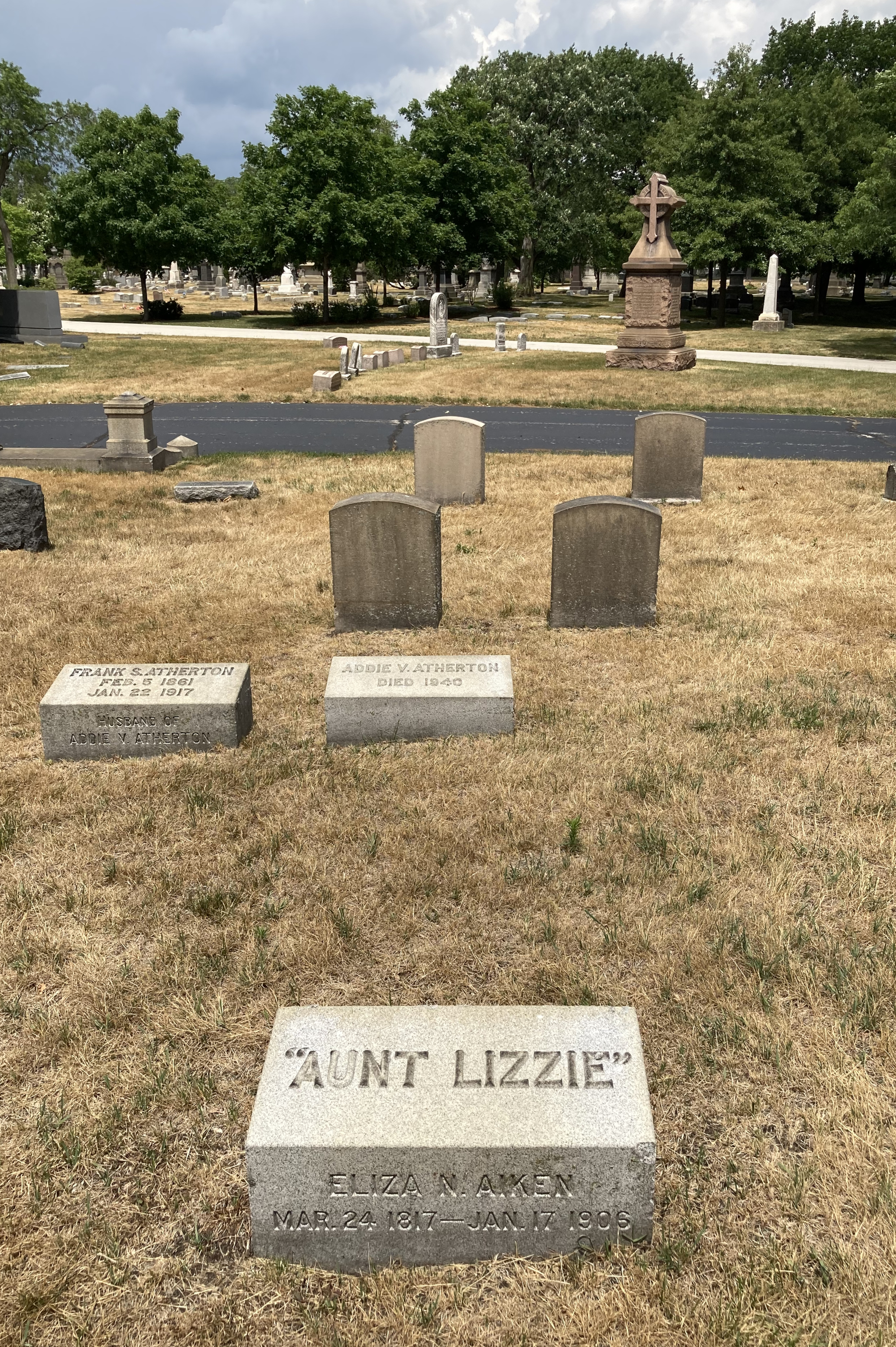
Aiken's grave at Graceland Cemetery

She was personally known to every U.S. president from Abraham Lincoln (16th President), through to Grover Cleveland (who served as the 22nd President). Some biographers have referred to Aiken as America's own "Florence Nightingale".

Aiken was an honored guest and speaker at the many Grand Army of the Republic events she attended.

Aiken died on January 17, 1906, aged 88. A funeral service was held at the Second Baptist Church in Chicago on January 20, 1906. The casket was draped in the American flag. In attendance were several well known ministers, judges and merchants. Of particular note were the tributes from pastor John Roach Straton, Reverend Galusha Anderson and other ministers and her nephew Frank S. Atherton. At the end of the service, Members of the Grand Army of the Republic escorted the hearse to her place of rest at Graceland Cemetery in Chicago. Some sources incorrectly state that she was laid to rest at Rosehill Cemetery.

A number of newspapers paid homage to her. The following tribute from 1906 is from the Christian Herald:

There died recently, in the City of Chicago, a woman whose career was so remarkable for its heroic self sacrifice and dauntless courage, that she could be ranked as high as the bravest soldier who does battle for his country. Her name was, Mrs. Eliza N. Aiken, but perhaps this would have an unfamiliar sound to the grizzled veterans; but say, "Aunt Lizzie" the angel of the hospitals of Memphis and Paducah, and they would raise their hands to the salute, out of respect and love to America' s Florence Nightingale.

== Ancestry ==
Her family came from Cavendish, Vermont. The Atherton family ancestry is from Lancashire, England. Her ancestral home, the Atherton Farmstead, is a historic farm located at 31 Greenbush Road in Cavendish, Vermont. Built in 1785, it is one of the oldest in the rural community, and is its oldest known surviving tavern house. It was listed on the National Register of Historic Places in 2002.

Her maternal grandfather was John Ward who was related to General Artemas Ward, a leader of the American Revolution.

== Portrayals on TV ==
- PBS - Mercy Street: "The Diabolical Plot". Episode 6. 2016 American Civil War drama

== See also ==
- 6th Illinois Cavalry Regiment
- Susan Cox (Civil War nurse)
- Mary Moore (Civil War nurse)
- Mary A. Gardner Holland
- Martha Baker
- Lucy Fenman Barron
- Estelle Johnson (Civil War nurse)
- Mary Loomis
- M.V. Harkin
