= Battle of Newton's Station =

Battle of the American Civil War

Coordinates: 32.320353°N 89.162423°W

- Part of the American Civil War
Date	April 24, 1863
Location	Newton's Station, Mississippi
Result	Union victory

Belligerents
United States (Union)	(Confederate States of America) CSA (Confederacy)

Commanders and leaders
Benjamin H. Grierson	Unknown

Strength
2 Regiments	34 Soldiers

Casualties and losses
4	25

The Battle of Newton's Station was an engagement on April 24, 1863, in Newton's Station, Mississippi, during the famous Grierson's Raid of the American Civil War (1861-1865).

Union Army cavalry raiders of 1,700 troopers in a brigade of three mounted regiments (6th and 7th Illinois and 2nd Iowa Cavalry Regiments) under the command of Col. Benjamin Grierson (1826-1911), in an effort to disrupt Confederate States Army and civilian east-west communications and the railway line between Vicksburg and the state capital of Jackson further to the east.

They left LaGrange, Tennessee in the north and drove south through Mississippi to eventually rendezvous with Federal-occupied Baton Rouge, the state capital of Louisiana to the south. The blue-coated troopers probed deep in enemy territory and entered the town of Newton's Station (now Newton). They succeeded in securing the town without any serious fighting and captured two Confederate trains nearby. The Yankee raiders also destroyed railroad facilities, equipment with the locomotives and box cars along with several miles of railroad track by tearing up and burning railroad ties, melting and twisting rails (nicknamed "General Sherman's neckties") and cutting telegraph wires and poles in the vicinity, severing communications between Confederate-held Vicksburg, under commanding Gen. John C. Pemberton (1814-1881) there and the Eastern Theatre with other Southern commanders in the Army of Northern Virginia, commanding General Robert E. Lee and the administration of President Jefferson Davis at the Confederate capital in Richmond, Virginia.

The two trains (one a freight and the second a mixed freight and passenger) were actually captured by Lt-Colonel William Blackburn, who had ridden ahead in darkness to scout the town. His men set fire to the trains, and exploding ammunition led the nearby Grierson to assume the worst, that a major battle had started. He arrived with the main force to find Blackburn's men helping themselves to confiscated whiskey.

Over the next few hours, Union Army forces destroyed trackage and equipment, as far east to the Chunky River and to the west as far as possible. A large building in the town with uniforms and arms was burned, and the railroad depot was burned (not before local hospital staff were allowed to remove medicine and food). Assembling his mounted forces, Colonel Grierson departed the area around 2 pm, leaving behind burned ruin, melted and twisted rails and devastated wreckage.

The 1863 Battle of Newton's Station and Grierson's cavalry exploits through Mississippi between La Grange, Tennessee and Baton Rouge, Louisiana were the basis of the 1959 movie The Horse Soldiers, directed by John Ford, starring John Wayne, William Holden and Constance Towers, and inspired by the earlier 1956 historical fiction novel by Harold Sinclair (1907-1966) of Bloomington, Illinois.
