= Grierson's Raid =

1863 Union attack during the American Civil War

Coordinates: 32°52′0″N 88°49′13″W

- Part of the American Civil War
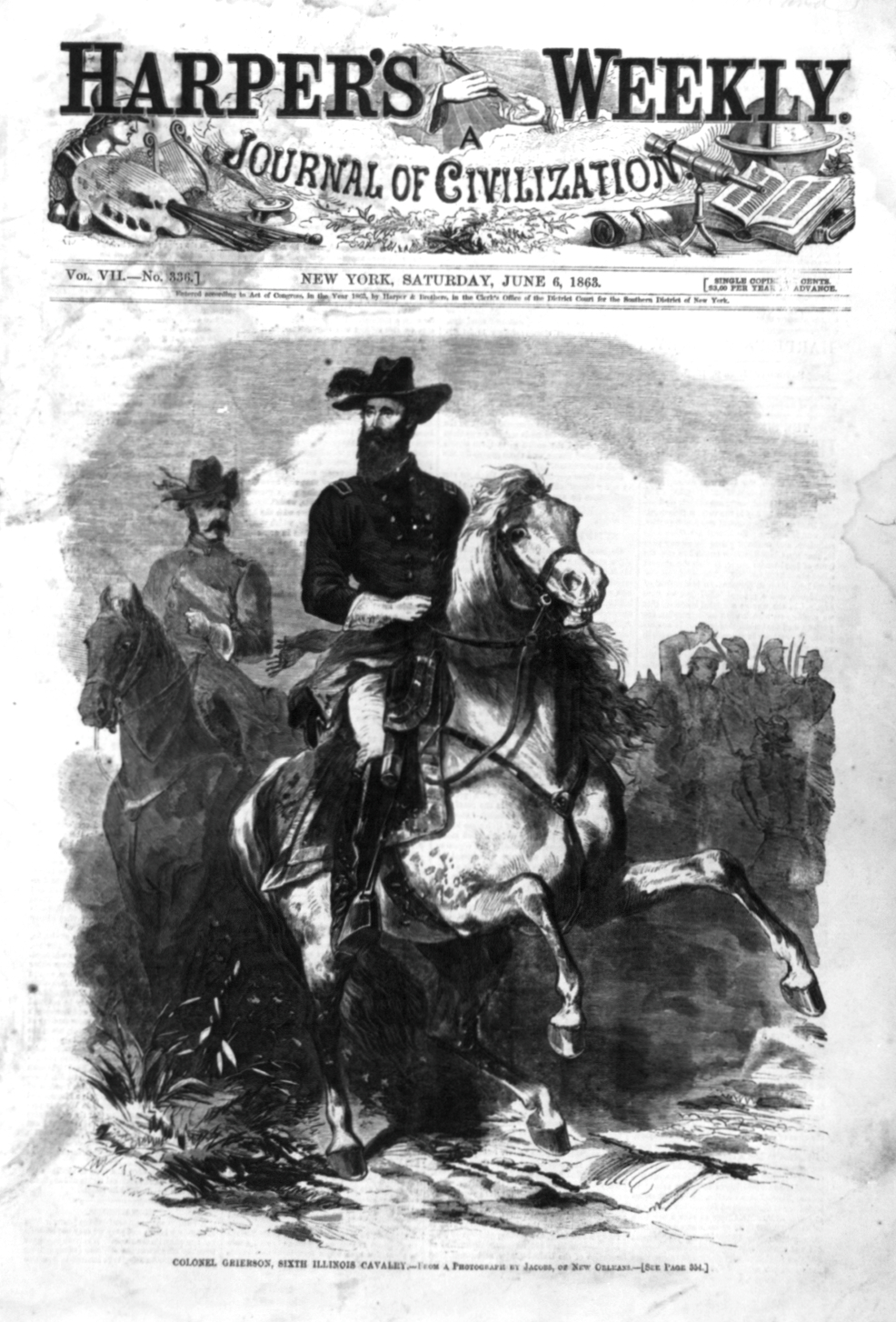
- Col. Benjamin Grierson leading his 6th Illinois Cavalry
Date	April 17, 1863 – May 2, 1863
Location	Start: La Grange, Tennessee; End: Baton Rouge, Louisiana
Result	Union victory

Belligerents
United States (Union)	(Confederate States of America) CSA (Confederacy)

Commanders and leaders
Benjamin H. Grierson	W. Wirt Adams; Robert V. Richardson and others

Strength
3 regiments	Unknown

Grierson's Raid was a Union cavalry raid during the Vicksburg Campaign of the American Civil War. It ran from April 17 to May 2, 1863, as a diversion from Maj. Gen. Ulysses S. Grant's main attack plan on Vicksburg, Mississippi.

== Background ==
Early in 1863, Major General Charles Hamilton, the commander of the Corinth section of Grant's division, suggested what would eventually become Grierson's Raid. Subsequently, due to Hamilton's insistence on procuring a command that would garner him more glory, Hamilton offered his resignation. Grant quickly accepted.

In the Western Theater of the American Civil War, Confederate cavalry raids under commanders such as Lt. Gen. Nathan Bedford Forrest and Brig. Gen. John Hunt Morgan had harassed Union expeditions, namely at the Battle of Parker's Crossroads, where Forrest captured three hundred Union soldiers under Brig. Gen. Jeremiah C. Sullivan, but lost all of the artillery pieces belonging to his own command. The task of drawing the attention of Confederate raiders away from the Siege of Vicksburg fell to Col. Benjamin Grierson, a former music teacher who disliked horses after being kicked in the head by one as a child. Grierson's cavalry brigade consisted of the 6th and 7th Illinois and 2nd Iowa Cavalry regiments.

== The Raid ==
Grierson's Raid. Union

Grierson and his 1,700 horse troopers, some in Confederate uniforms serving as scouts for the main force, rode over 600 miles (970 km) through hostile territory (from southern Tennessee, through the State of Mississippi and into Union-held Baton Rouge, Louisiana), over routes no Union soldier had traveled before. They tore up railroads and burned crossties, freed slaves, burned Confederate storehouses, destroyed locomotives and commissary stores, ripped up bridges and trestles, burned buildings, and inflicted ten times the casualties they received, all while detachments of his troops made feints confusing the Confederates as to his actual whereabouts, intent and direction. Total casualties for Grierson's Brigade during the raid were three killed, seven wounded, and nine missing. Five sick and wounded men were left behind along the route, too ill to continue. Grierson reported to have killed and wounded 100 Confederates, captured 500, destroyed between 50 and 60 miles of railroad, destroyed over 3,000 stands of arms (a rifle plus all its accompanying kit), and captured 1,000 horses and mules.

Confederate States Army Lt. Gen. John C. Pemberton (1814-1881), commander of the Vicksburg garrison on the east bank of the Mississippi River behind heavily fortified trenches, had few cavalry and could do nothing to stop Grierson from rampaging further east in the state's interior.

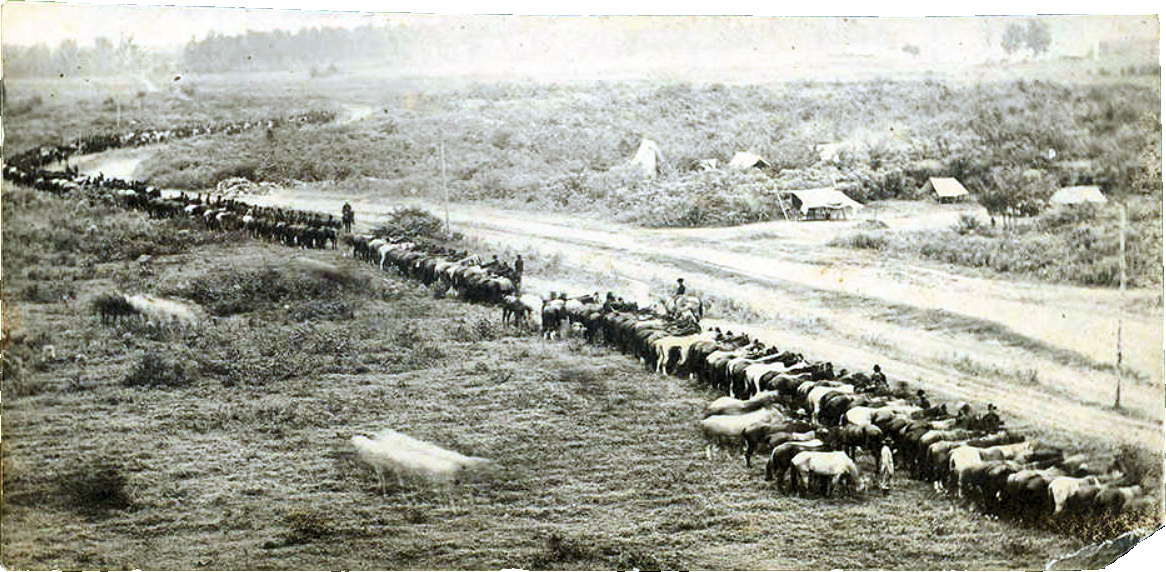
Grierson's raiders.

Around the same period, on April 21, 1863, Confederate cavalry commander Maj. Gen. Nathan Bedford Forrest (1821-1877), had however pursued and captured another Union Army cavalry raider, Col. Abel Streight (1828-1892), further east in Alabama following a different poorly supplied and poorly planned raid (Streight's Raid) by the generally more powerful and well-supplied Union Army.

Although many other divergent Confederate Army cavalry units pursued Col. Grierson vigorously across the state (most notably Wirt Adams' Cavalry Regiment and Robert V. Richardson's Tennessee Cavalry), they were unsuccessful in stopping the raid driving southward. Grierson and his troopers, exhausted by days in the saddle, ultimately rode into Union-occupied Baton Rouge, Louisiana, the capital of the state in early May. With an entire division of Pemberton's Southern soldiers tied up and dug-in defending the vital Vicksburg-Jackson east/west railroad from the evasive Grierson on mobile horseback, combined with Northern Maj. Gen. William T. Sherman's (1820-1891) feint to the northeast of Vicksburg (in the Battle of Snyder's Bluff), the beleaguered Confederates were unable to muster the forces necessary to oppose Gen. Grant's eventual bypassing landing below Vicksburg on the east side of the lower Mississippi at Bruinsburg.

== In popular culture ==
The 1956 historical novel The Horse Soldiers by Harold Sinclair, and the 1959 film of the same name loosely based on it – directed by John Ford, and starring John Wayne, William Holden and Constance Towers – are somewhat fictionalized versions of Grierson's Raid and the Battle of Newton's Station.

== See also ==
- Battle of Newton's Station
- Clan Grierson
