= Mary Moore =

Mary Moore may refer to:

- Mary Moore (author) (1930–2017), British author, diplomat and administrator
- Mary Moore (infielder) (born 1932), All-American Girls Professional Baseball League player
- Mary Moore (mayor) (born 1957), first woman elected as mayor of Pearsall, Texas, (2015)
- Mary Moore (pitcher) (1942–1986), All-American Girls Professional Baseball League player
- Mary Moore (sculptor) (1887–1967), American sculptor and teacher
- Mary Moore (stage actress) (1861–1931), English born actress, second wife of Sir Charles Wyndham
- Mary Moore (voice actor), first national voice of the Bell System's standardized speaking clock
- Mary Moore, daughter of sculptor Henry Moore
- Mary Agnes Moore (1890–1919), Irish-born American actress, Red Cross volunteer in WWI
- Mary Carr Moore (1873–1957), American composer
- Mary Elsie Moore (1889–1941), American heiress
- Mary Tyler Moore (1936–2017), American actress
- Mary Moore-Bentley (1865–1953), Australian writer and parliamentary candidate
- Mary Moore (Civil War nurse), Union nurse during the American Civil War
- Mary Moore (Alabama politician) (born 1948), member of the Alabama House of Representatives
- Mary Elizabeth Moore, educator, writer, and dean of the Boston University School of Theology
- Mary Emelia Moore (1869–1951), New Zealand Presbyterian missionary in China
- Mary Moore (artist) (born 1957), Western Australian artist
- Mary Clare Moore (1814–1874), Irish Sister of Mercy, Crimean War nurse and teacher
- Mary Lambeth Moore, American novelist and podcaster
- Mary Moore (high jumper), winner of the 1984 and 1985 high jump at the NCAA Division I Indoor Track and Field Championships
