= Allen K. Wood =

American assistant director and production manager

- Born: Allen Kirkham Wood; October 8, 1898; Sioux City, Iowa, U.S.
- Died: December 14, 1977 (aged 79); Burbank, California, U.S.
- Occupation(s): Assistant director, production manager

Allen Kirkham Wood (October 8, 1898 – December 14, 1977) was an American assistant director and production manager.

Wood served as a production manager for over 100 films, including In the Heat of the Night, The Magnificent Seven, The Children's Hour, Invasion of the Body Snatchers, Irma la Douce, The Horse Soldiers, The Gunfight at Dodge City, Man of the West, How to Succeed in Business Without Really Trying, West Side Story, Follow That Dream, The Apartment, Toys in the Attic, The Hallelujah Trail, The Fortune Cookie, Cast a Giant Shadow, The Thomas Crown Affair, Guns of the Magnificent Seven, Hour of the Gun and The Russians Are Coming, the Russians Are Coming.

Wood died in December 1977 in Burbank, California, at the age of 79.
