= Atherton Farmstead =

- U.S. National Register of Historic Places
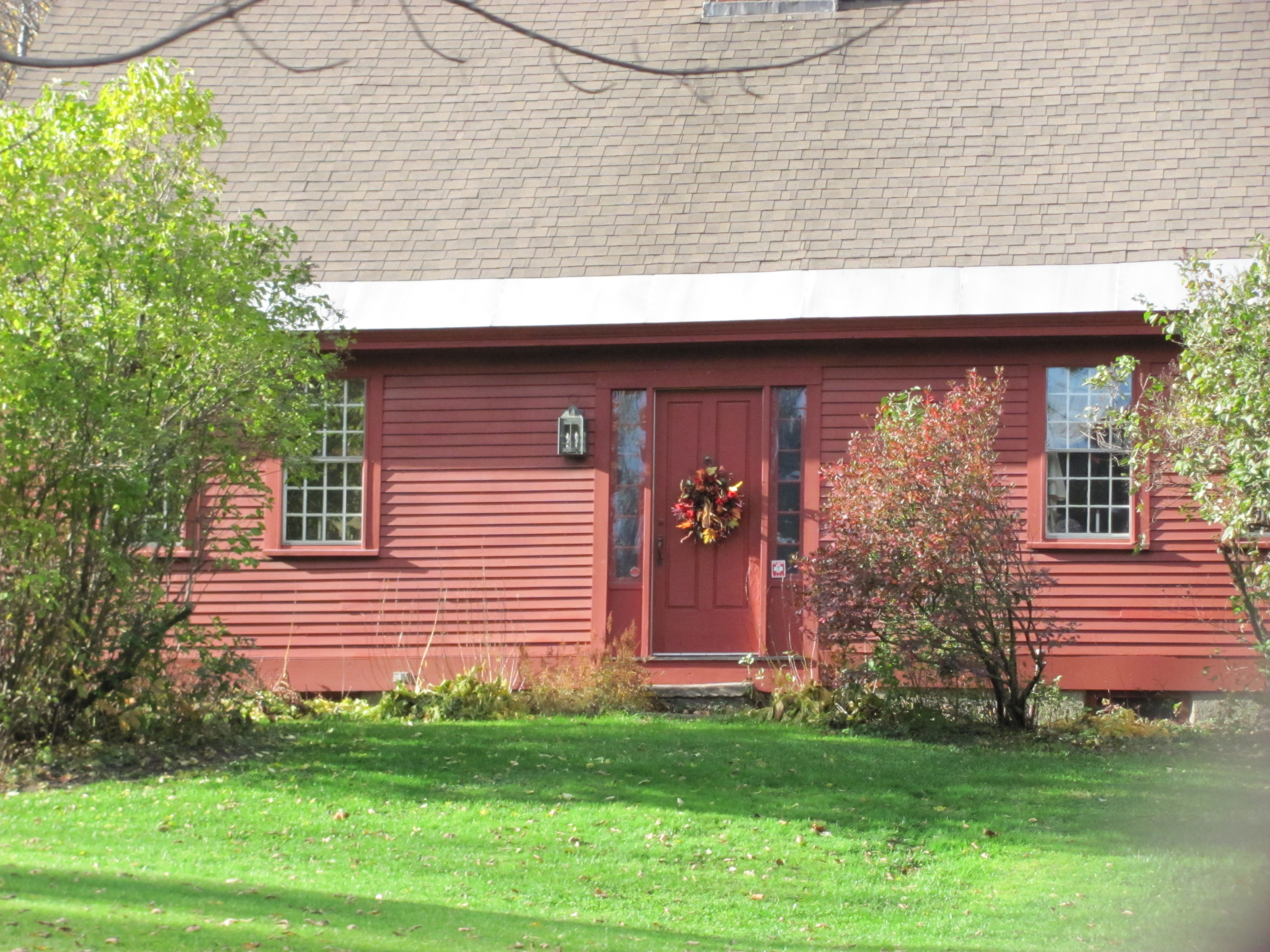

- Location within Vermont Location within the United States
- Location: 31 Greenbush Rd., Cavendish, Vermont
- Area: 43 acres (17 ha)
- Architectural style: Federal
- MPS: Agricultural Resources of Vermont MPS
- NRHP reference No.: 02000119
- Added to NRHP: March 1, 2002

The Atherton Farmstead is a historic farm property at 31 Greenbush Road in Cavendish, Vermont. The farmhouse, built in 1785, is one of the oldest in the rural community, and is its oldest known surviving tavern house. It was listed on the National Register of Historic Places in 2002.

== Description and history ==
The Atherton Farmstead is located in rural northeastern Cavendish, at the junction of Tarbell Hill and Greenbush Roads. The farm property is 43 acres (17 ha), including more than 20 acres (8.1 ha) located on the west side of Tarbell Hill Road. The farm building complex is accessed via a drive at the junction of the two roads. The main house is a 1 1/2-story Cape style wood-frame structure, with a gabled roof, central chimney, and clapboard siding. The interior retains original period Federal style finishes. North of the main house stands a 19th-century barn, with an early 20th-century carriage shed set near Greenbush Road south of the house.

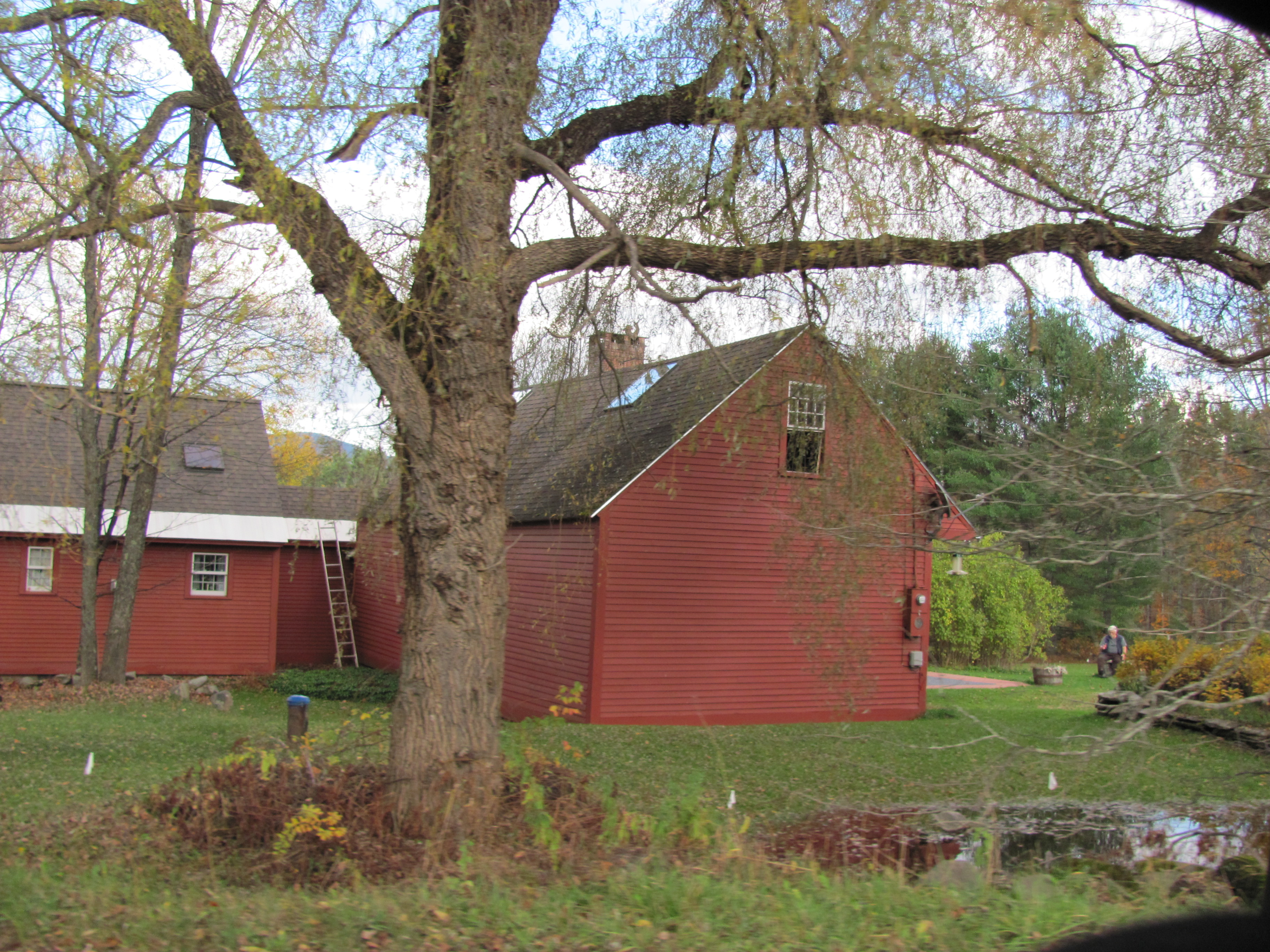
Back of the Atherton Farmstead

This area was not settled until the construction of the Crown Point Road in 1759-60 by British military forces, which was roughly aligned on the present roadways in this area, and was one of the first roads to be built anywhere in present-day Vermont. The Atherton Farm property was one of the first to be settled in what is now Cavendish, and had from c. 1770 a structure that served as a tavern. The present house was probably built in the 1780s, by either Samuel Paine or Thomas Gilbert, and may have been built around the existing log building. It was an ancestral home for Lizzie Aiken and Henry B. Atherton. The property was farmed until the 1930s, at which time it was converted into a summer residence.

== See also ==
- National Register of Historic Places listings in Windsor County, Vermont
