= Martha Baker =

American Civil War nurse (1838–1918)

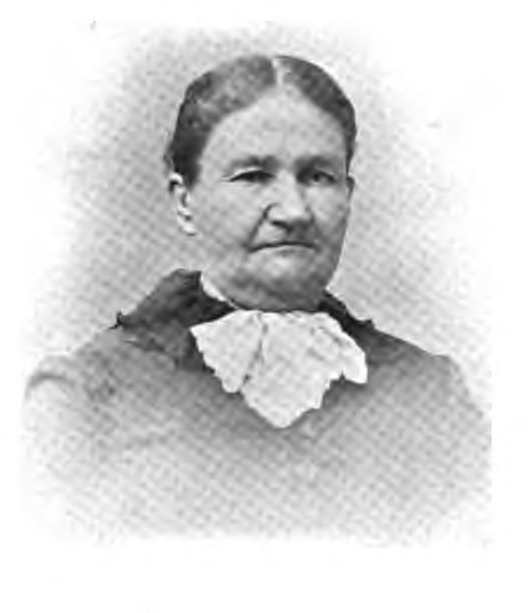
- Born: April 9, 1838; Concord, Indiana
- Died: September 18, 1918 (aged 80); Rushville, Missouri
- Occupation: Nurse

Martha Baker (April 9, 1838 in Concord, Indiana – September 18, 1918 in Rushville, Missouri) was a nurse in the American Civil War. Fighting alongside her husband, Baker served until 1865.

== Early life ==
Martha Baker was born on April 9, 1838, to Benjamin and Anna Denton of Concord, Indiana. Little is known about her early life except that she lived in Indiana, and attended Sugar Grove Institute at age 16. Her parents had died by 1859, the year that she married Abner Baker.

== Civil War service ==
In February 1862, Abner Baker enlisted in the 40th Indiana Volunteers regiment to fight in the Civil War. Baker's husband became a chief wound dresser, and sent for Baker to accompany him as the head of a special diet kitchen for the Officers' Hospital in Stockwell, Indiana in January 1864. She prepared about 500 meals a day. In her letter to Mary G. Holland for Holland's book, Our Army Nurses: Stories from Women in the Civil War, Baker writes of the under-staffing issue that plagued hospitals of the Union and Confederacy during the Civil War.

Baker describes the battle of Nashville as the moment when she beheld "all the horrors of war." The cannonading was so heavy, and only 100 feet from the hospital in which Baker worked, that the building shook. During her time as a nurse, Baker met two women disguised as men, one being Frances Hook and someone else by the name of Anna, and helped disguise their identities. This account fits perfectly with Hook's story as it has been reconstructed. She continued her service until February 1865.
