= Lucy Fenman Barron =

Historic US figure

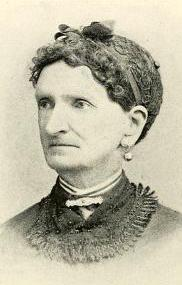
- Lucy Fenman Barron, from an 1897 publication.
- Military career
- Allegiance: United States
- Unit: nurse with the 111th Pennsylvania Infantry

Lucy Fenman Barron served as a Union nurse during the American Civil War from March 1861 until March 1863. She enlisted in the 111th Pennsylvania Infantry, and spent the first two months of her service at Camp Reed in Erie. Barron served in Pennsylvania, Maryland, and West Virginia, even serving at Harper's Ferry until the surrender in September. According to Barron, some of the places she served looked more like houses than hospitals. She even spent some time under Confederate occupation, though she enlisted with the Union. One of the moments Barron shares in Mary G. Holland's book of letters is preserving a soldier's life until he could be baptized, only to die minutes later.

After surviving the war, Barron retired in Eureka, California.
