= M.V. Harkin =

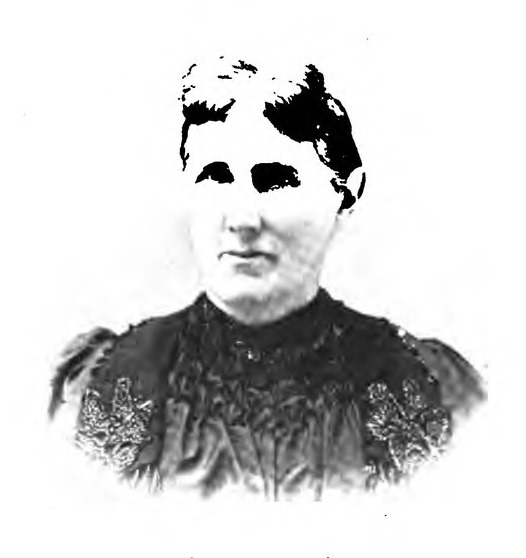

M.V. Harkin was a Union nurse during the American Civil War. In a letter to Mary G. Holland about her wartime experience, Harkin describes a spirit of excitement and enthusiasm on behalf of the nurses, soldiers, and civilians as the newly-enlisted members were traveling.

== Civil War service ==
Not much is known about Harkin's life before the war, but on February 13, 1862, she traveled to Madison, Wisconsin State House to be commissioned as a volunteer nurse. The very next day, she was transferred to a local hospital for instruction. On February 17, Harkin and her mother Sarah A. McKenna began service with the 17th Wisconsin Volunteer Infantry.

Harkin notes, however, that these individuals were in for a shock once they got to the fields. Harkin describes a measles outbreak early on in her wartime experience, which was not uncommon given the poor sanitary conditions of medical environments. The hardship only increased as the regiment was ordered to Shiloh. Upon arrival at the Shiloh front, the soldiers traveling with Harkin's regiment were initially ordered to bury those who had died in battle before even beginning service.

According to Harkin's letter, the hardships only continued. The rations were inadequate, and nurses nearly starved--eating only hardtack--to save every scrap of food for the soldiers and the patients. A nurse's long night of caring for the wounded was augmented by cooking and cleaning duties. Even the nurses were susceptible to illness: Harkin writes about a fellow nurse and friend passing away and the effect it had on her. Harkin even mentions that they could not attain a coffin for the nurse, so a soldier fashioned one out of cracker boxes.

Harkin and her mother soon answered a call for nurses in Corinth. Harkin mentions that the facilities at Corinth were much better, which helped soldiers recuperate faster. During her time at Corinth, Harkin was almost taken as a spy by the Confederate Army while riding her horse. Harkin refused to be taken captive, flying back to camp on her horse to avoid the gunfire from the Confederates. Thankfully, Harkin survived the encounter unharmed.

Unfortunately, Harkin ultimately had to leave the service due to her own poor health. She followed her mother north for service but remained and exited the regiment as her mother returned to Corinth.
