= Grierson Spring =

Coordinates: 31°07′31″N 101°39′43″W

Grierson Spring is a historic spring located in Texas between the Concho and Pecos Rivers. It formed the head of a watershed from Llano Estacado. It was named after Benjamin Grierson, whose troops helped build an outpost on it and a road through it in 1878. This allowed for him to have control over the water supply in an attempt to control the region.
