= The Horse Soldiers =

1959 American film by John Ford

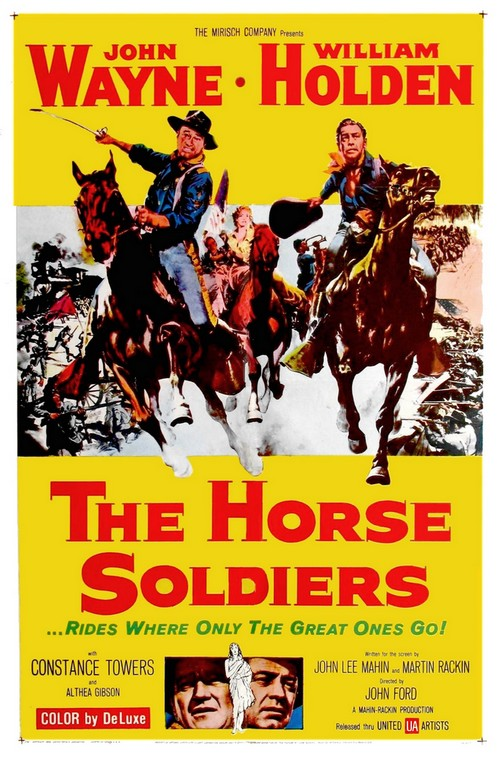
- 1959 movie poster
- Directed by: John Ford
- Screenplay by: John Lee Mahin; Martin Rackin
- Based on: The Horse Soldiers; 1956 novel by Harold Sinclair (1907-1966)
- Produced by: John Lee Mahin (uncredited); Martin Rackin (uncredited); Allen K. Wood (production manager)
- Starring: John Wayne; William Holden; Constance Towers
- Cinematography: William H. Clothier
- Edited by: Jack Murray
- Music by: David Buttolph
- Color process: Color by Deluxe
- Production company: The Mirisch Company
- Distributed by: United Artists
- Release date: 1959
- Running time: 120 minutes
- Country: United States
- Language: English
- Box office: $3.8 million (US and Canada rentals)

The Horse Soldiers is a 1959 American adventure war film set during the American Civil War directed by John Ford and starring John Wayne, William Holden, and Constance Towers. The screenplay by John Lee Mahin and Martin Rackin was loosely based on the Harold Sinclair (1907-1966) 1956 novel of historical fiction of the same name, a fictionalized version of the famous Grierson's Raid by federal cavalry in April–May 1863 riding southward through Mississippi and around the Mississippi River fortress of Vicksburg during the Vicksburg campaign to split the southern Confederacy by Union Army General Ulysses S. Grant.

== Plot ==
A Union cavalry brigade led by Colonel John Marlowe — a railroad construction engineer in civilian life — is sent on a raid behind Confederate Army lines to destroy railroad track and the Confederate supply depot for Vicksburg at Newton Station. Newly assigned Major Henry Kendall, a regimental surgeon who is torn between duty and the horror of war, is constantly at odds with Marlowe.

While the raiders rest overnight at Greenbriar Plantation, Miss Hannah Hunter, the plantation's mistress, acts as a gracious hostess to the unit's officers, hosting a dinner for them and exaggerating her "Southern manners and courtesies" to hide her dismay and disgust towards the invading Yankees. Her enslaved maid, Lukey, and she eavesdrop on a staff meeting as Colonel Marlowe discusses his battle strategy to avoid tangling with Confederate States Army troops as he drives south through Mississippi south to the Union-occupied Louisiana state capital of Baton Rouge. To protect the secrecy of the mission, Marlowe is forced to take the two women along with him.

Initially hostile to her Yankee captors, Miss Hunter gradually comes to respect Colonel Marlowe and eventually falls in love with him. In addition to the surgeon Major Kendall and Miss Hunter, Marlowe also must contend with Colonel Phil Secord, a politically ambitious officer commanding the other cavalry regiment. Secord continually questions and second-guesses Marlowe's orders and command decisions.

Several battles ensue, including the capture of the vital supply depot at Newton Station, plus a later skirmish during which Lukey is killed by a rebel sniper; and a surprise dawn attack and skirmish with cadets from a local Southern military academy (based on an actual incident in May 1864's Battle of New Market in the Shenandoah Valley campaigns of western Virginia, when a battalion of youths averaging eighteen years of age from the Corps of Cadets of the Virginia Military Institute was thrown into battle; see also Battle of Natural Bridge).

After destroying the crucial enemy supplies and equipment at Newton's Station, cutting the railway line between Vicksburg and the Mississippi state capital of Jackson further east, and now with Confederate Army cavalry forces in hot pursuit, the Union Army brigade under Colonels Marlowe and Secord reaches a bridge that must be stormed and taken to reach the federal lines at Baton Rouge. After taking the bridge, Marlowe's men rig it with barrels of black powder. Marlowe bids Hannah farewell, professing that he is in love with her. Dr. Kendall chooses to remain behind with some badly wounded men in a log cabin by the bridge rigged up as a temporary hospital, knowing he will be captured with them, rather than leave them without medical attention until Confederate medical personnel arrive with the pursuing Southerners.

Marlowe, though wounded in the leg, lights the fuse to the explosives with a cigar. He is the last of his men to gallop in a rush across the bridge before it explodes, halting the Confederate chase. Their mission accomplished, his brigade and he continue toward Baton Rouge.

== Cast ==
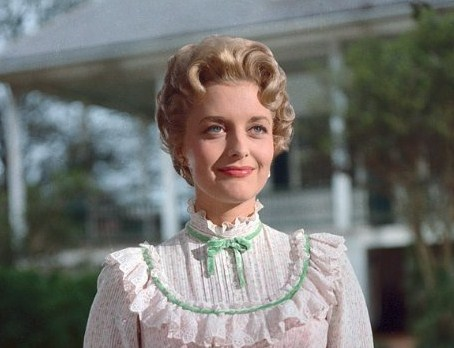
Constance Towers as Miss Hannah Hunter of "Greenbriar" plantation

- John Wayne as Lieutenant Colonel John Marlowe
- William Holden as Major Henry 'Hank' Kendall, army surgeon
- Constance Towers as Miss Hannah Hunter of "Greenbriar" plantation
- Althea Gibson as Lukey, Miss Hunter's enslaved maid
- Judson Pratt as Sergeant Major Kirby
- Ken Curtis as Corporal Wilkie
- Willis Bouchey as Lieutenant Colonel Phil Secord, commander of the First Michigan Regiment of Cavalry
- Bing Russell as Dunker, trooper
- O.Z. Whitehead as Hospital Steward Otis 'Hoppy' Hopkins
- Hank Worden as Deacon Clump, scout
- Chuck Hayward as Captain Winters
- Denver Pyle as Jackie Jo, Confederate deserter
- Strother Martin as Virgil, Confederate deserter
- Basil Ruysdael as Principal of Jefferson Military Academy
- Carleton Young as Colonel Jonathan Miles, commander of Confederate troops in Newton Station
- William Leslie as Major Richard Gray
- William Henry as Confederate First Lieutenant
- Walter Reed as Union Army Officer
- Anna Lee as Mrs. Buford
- William Forrest as General Steve Hurlburt
- Ron Hagerthy as Bugler
- Russell Simpson as Captain Henry Goodbody, acting sheriff
- Hoot Gibson as Sergeant Brown

== Background ==
The film was loosely based on Harold Sinclair's 1956 novel of the same name, which in turn was based on the historic 17-day Grierson's Raid and Battle of Newton's Station in Mississippi during the Civil War.

In April 1863, Colonel Benjamin Grierson led 1,700 Illinois and Iowa soldiers from La Grange, Tennessee, to Baton Rouge, Louisiana, through several hundred miles of enemy territory, destroying Confederate railroad and supply lines between Newton's Station and Vicksburg, Mississippi. The mission was part of the Union Army's successful Vicksburg campaign to gain control over boat traffic on the Mississippi River, culminating in the Battle of Vicksburg. Grierson's destruction of Confederate-controlled rail links and supplies played an important role in disrupting Confederate General John C. Pemberton's strategies and troop deployments. Union General William Tecumseh Sherman reportedly described Grierson's daring mission as "the most brilliant of the war".

Though based loosely on Grierson's Raid, The Horse Soldiers is a fictional account that departs considerably from the actual events. The real-life protagonist, a music teacher named Benjamin Grierson, becomes railroad engineer John Marlowe in the film. Hannah Hunter, Marlowe's love interest, has no historical counterpart. Numerous other details were altered as well, "to streamline and popularize the story for the non-history buffs who would make up a large part of the audience."

Dr. Erastus Dean Yule, the real-life surgeon counterpart of Major Hank Kendall, actually did volunteer to stay behind and get captured by the Confederates with the casualties who were too wounded to continue. The raid actually took place about a year before the notorious Andersonville POW camp was built, and he was eventually exchanged after several months as a POW.

== Production ==
Exterior scenes were filmed in Natchitoches Parish, Louisiana, along the banks of Cane River Lake, and in and around Natchez, Mississippi. The film company built a bridge over the Cane River for the pivotal battle scene, and many locals were hired as extras. It also features scenes shot in Wildwood Regional Park in Thousand Oaks, California. The film used DeLuxe Color.

Holden and Wayne both received $750,000 for starring, a record salary at the time. The project was plagued from the start by cost overruns, discord, and tragedy. Holden and Ford argued incessantly. Wayne was preoccupied with pre-production logistics for The Alamo. Lukey's dialog was originally written in "Negro" dialect that Althea Gibson, the former Wimbledon and U.S. National tennis champion who was cast in the role, found offensive. She informed Ford that she would not deliver her lines as written. Though Ford was notorious for his intolerance of actors' demands, he agreed to modify the script.

During filming of the climactic battle scene, veteran stuntman Fred Kennedy suffered a broken neck while performing a horse fall and died. "Ford was completely devastated," wrote biographer Joseph Malham. "[He] felt a deep responsibility for the lives of the men who served under him." The film was scripted to end with the triumphant arrival of Marlowe's forces in Baton Rouge, but Ford "simply lost interest" after Kennedy's death. He ended the film with Marlowe's farewell to Hannah Hunter before crossing and blowing up the bridge.

== Reception ==
The film opened at number one in the United States but was ultimately a commercial failure, due largely to Wayne's and Holden's high salaries and the complex participation of multiple production companies. The response of audiences and critics was "lackluster".

Literary critic Manny Farber writing in The New Leader offers this assessment:

The Horse Soldiers is the disaster of the month, an eventful canter in which director Ford, without any plot to speak of, falls back on boyish Irish playfulness (played by a rigor-mortified John Wayne, an almost non-existent Bill Holden, and a new gnashing beauty named Connie Towers) to fill a several-million-dollar investment. The ‘comedy’ which includes Wayne’s troubles with a drunken top sergeant, a soldiering doctor, and a captive Southern belle, is interspersed with Ford’s stolidly evolved, beefy, Bonheur-ish ‘pictures.’ It all takes place on a plodding journey, which sends 1,700 hundred Union cavalrymen into the Confederacy in search of what turns out to be a screenplay.”

== See also ==
- John Wayne filmography
- Hoot Gibson filmography

== Sources ==
- Farber, Manny. 2009. Farber on Film: The Complete Film Writings of Manny Farber. Edited by Robert Polito. Library of America. ISBN 978-1-59853-050-6
