= Harold Sinclair (novelist) =

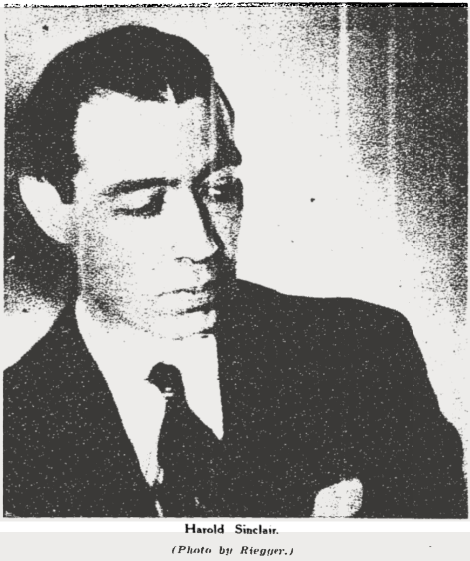
Harold Sinclair in 1938

Harold Sinclair (1907–1966) was an Illinois writer who produced several historical novels, including some about settler life in the Midwest. He was also a musician, and wrote about jazz and New Orleans. He was born on May 8, 1907, in Chicago. At the age of eight he moved to Bloomington, Illinois. He dropped out of high school and traveled around the country, but eventually returned to live in Bloomington. While working in a hardware store in Chicago, he wrote his first book (Journey Home, 1936). The New York Times and Newsweek both published positive reviews of his second novel, American Years, in 1938. It was the first of a trilogy about the town of Everton, Illinois, a fictional name for Bloomington. Roy W. Meyer said, "[Although n]ot properly a farm novel at all ... [t]here is a sense of authenticity in the account of the daily lives and concerns of these small town Illinois people". In 1939 he was awarded a Guggenheim Fellowship in creative writing.

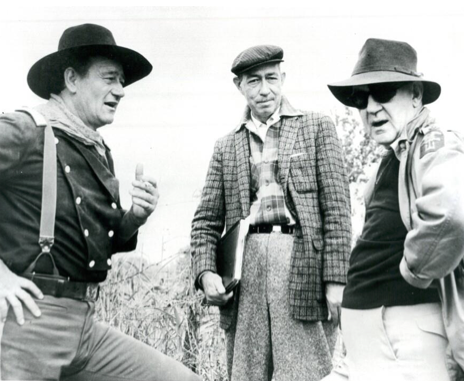
Harold Sinclair, center, with actor John Wayne, left, and film director John Ford during the making of the 1959 movie The Horse Soldiers

His most well-known book, The Horse Soldiers (1956), was adapted and made into a film of the same name, by noted director John Ford and starring John Wayne, William Holden and Constance Towers. It was about the famous Grierson's Raid of April–May 1863, of Union Army Cavalry commander Col. Benjamin Grierson's (1826–1911) long raid southward from LaGrange, Tennessee through Confederate heartland of Mississippi to Federal-occupied Baton Rouge, Louisiana, and going around the besieged Confederacy's important vital Mississippi River fortress of Vicksburg, Mississippi during the Vicksburg Campaign in the American Civil War. Because The Horse Soldiers was such a commercial success in the 1960s (and remains popular 70 years later), shortly before his 1966 death, Sinclair signed an option to have the 1958 sequel Civil War book that he wrote, The Cavalryman, become a made-for-television series. (Unfortunately, it was never produced.) He died on May 24, 1966, in Bloomington.

== Bibliography ==
- Journey Home, 1936
- Westward the Tide, 1940
- The Port of New Orleans, 1942
- Music Out of Dixie, 1953
- Mrs. Ives of Illinois
- Daily Pantagraph, 1846–1946

=== Everton Trilogy ===
- American Years, 1938
- Years of Growth, 1940
- Years of Illusion, 1941

=== About Benjamin Grierson and the American Civil War ===
- The Horse Soldiers, 1956
- The Cavalryman, 1958
