= Mary Loomis =

American nurse

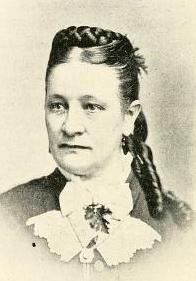
- Loomis, from an 1897 publication.
- Occupation: Nurse

Mary Loomis was a Union nurse during the American Civil War. Loomis served for a total of two and a half years.

== Civil War service ==
When the Civil War broke out, Loomis was living with her first husband, George W. Van Pelt, in Coldwater, Michigan. She enlisted in the service as a volunteer nurse alongside her husband in May 1861 as Mary Van Pelt; they were both in the 1st Michigan Light Artillery. She was later appointed to Hospital Number 13 in Nashville, Tennessee, to serve as the hospital matron. She worked at this location from September 1862 until January 1863. In Nashville, Mrs. Van Pelt served under a surgeon by the name of H.J.Merrick, MD. She then went on to the Number 20 hospital, also in Nashville, until May. Once again, Van Pelt served as a matron, this time under the surgeon J.R. Goodwin, MD. Van Pelt only served in hospitals for a year of her service. The rest of the time, she was in camp with her regiment or marching from one place to the other with them. Her husband died in the Battle of Chickamauga in September 1863, and Mary left the service shortly after in November.
