= Estelle Johnson (Civil War nurse) =

Nineteenth century war nurse

- Born: February 2, 1841
- Died: December 25, 1910 (aged 69)
- Occupation: Union American Civil War nurse

Estelle Johnson (February 2, 1841 – December 25, 1910) was a Union nurse during the American Civil War. She and her sister, Lydia Wood, enlisted when their husbands joined the service. The two women and their husbands served in the 4th Vermont Volunteers; Johnson and Wood enlisted on September 20, 1861. After long travels, the regiment finally set up camp at Camp Griffin.

== Civil War service ==
Upon arrival at camp, Johnson helped set up a hospital in an abandoned house as soon as possible. Johnson was immediately exposed to the harsh camp life; at first the hospital was so low on supplies they did not even have cots. When word got out about the poor conditions at this makeshift hospital, drastic changes occurred, and supplies were sent to the regiment. Eventually, Johnson became matron of this hospital which cared for the Vermont Brigade.

Camp hardships surpassed supply shortages, however. Soon typhoid fever plagued the regiment, Johnson's husband and sister both falling ill. Her husband recovered, but Lydia Wood died. Johnson also encountered two soldiers who she believed died from sheer homesickness. Another noteworthy experience for Johnson were her trips to Washington, D.C. where she met Dorothea Dix.

Johnson's husband was discharged upon injury, but Johnson continued her service for a few months after his departure. She left the service on March 23, 1862, after six months of service.
