= Robert V. Richardson =

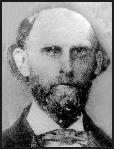
- Born: November 4, 1820; Granville County, North Carolina
- Died: January 6, 1870 (aged 49); Clarkton, Missouri
- Burial place: Elmwood Cemetery (Memphis, Tennessee)
- Military career
- Allegiance: Confederate States of America
- Branch: Confederate States Army
- Service years: 1861 – 1865 (CSA)
- Rank: Brigadier General
- Conflicts: American Civil War: Battle of Shiloh; Battle of Corinth
- Other work: civil engineer

Robert Vinkler Richardson (November 4, 1820 – January 6, 1870) was a brigadier general in the Confederate States Army during the American Civil War.

== Early life ==
Richardson was born in Granville County, North Carolina, on November 4, 1820. His family moved to Hardeman County, Tennessee, when Richardson was a child. Richardson was admitted to the bar and moved to Memphis, Tennessee, in 1847 to practice there. He made business connections with Nathan Bedford Forrest and Gideon J. Pillow.

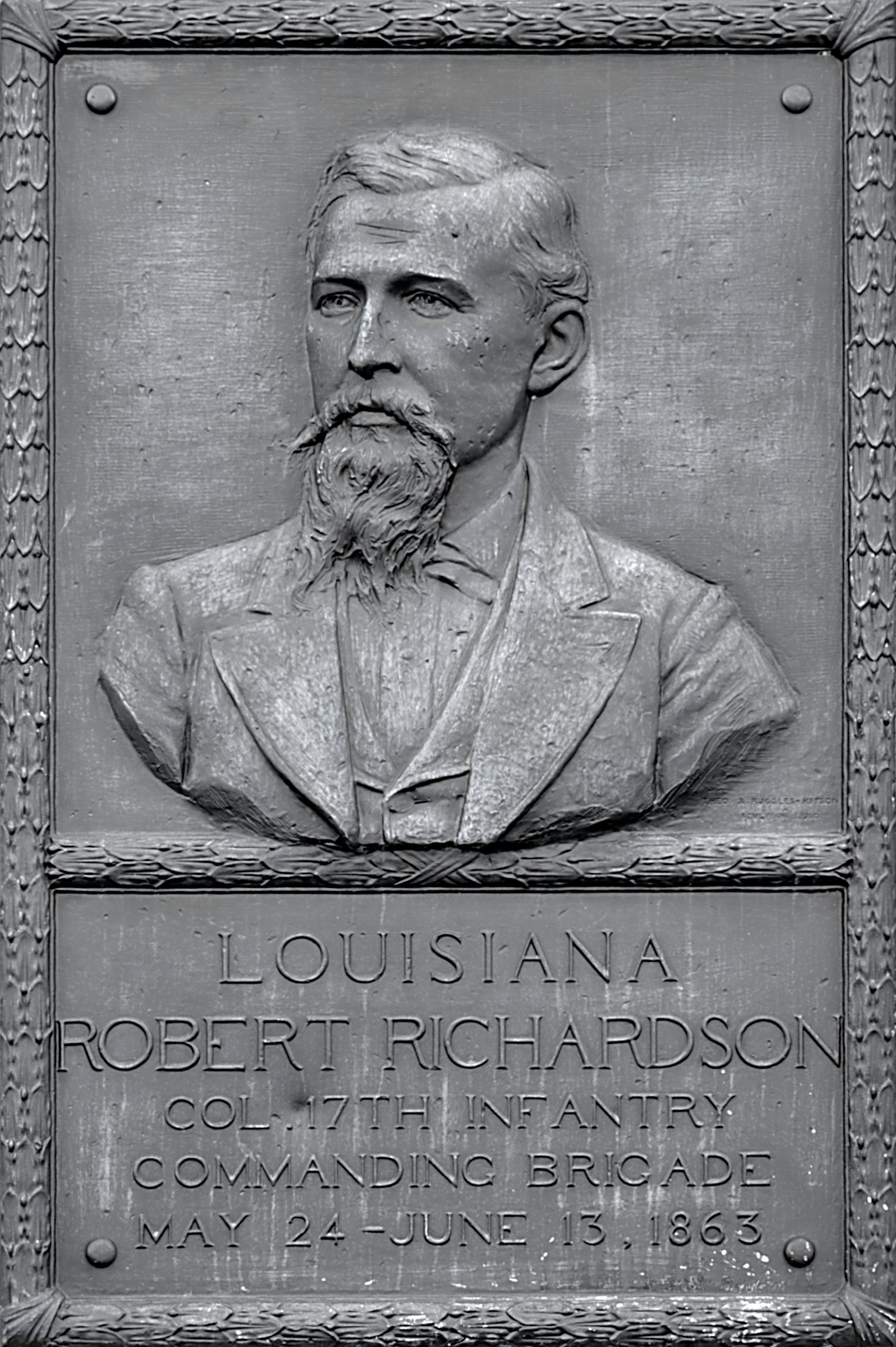
Bronze relief portrait of Richardson by T.A.R. Kitson, Vicksburg National Military Park

== Civil War ==
During the early part of the War, Richardson served under Pillow and recruited the 12th Tennessee Cavalry (also known as the 1st Tennessee Partisan Rangers) and was elected that unit's colonel. Richardson engaged in the Battle of Shiloh and the Siege of Corinth. He was attached to Forrest's command in the fall of 1863. On December 3, he was appointed brigadier general; however, after being confirmed his nomination was returned by the Confederate Senate at the request of President Jefferson Davis on February 9, 1864. From then to the remainder of the War, his regiment was attached to James R. Chalmers' command.

A communication from Richardson dated October 28, 1863 at Water Valley, MS indicated the difficult living conditions experienced during the War: "For God and the country's sake, make your fair promising, but never complying Quartermaster send me skillets, ovens, pots, or anything else that will bake bread or fry meat. I want clothing, shoes and blankets for my naked and freezing men. . . . I cannot fight any more until I get something to cook in."

== Post-War and murder ==
After the War, Richardson travelled abroad and lived overseas. He returned to Memphis and worked in levee and railroad construction with Forrest. After stopping at a tavern in Clarkton, Missouri, on January 5, 1870, he was shot by an unknown assailant who fired a shotgun at him from behind a wagon in the tavern yard. He died the next day and is buried in Elmwood Cemetery in Memphis.

== See also ==
- List of American Civil War generals (Confederate)
- List of unsolved murders
