= Benjamin Grierson =

19th-century U.S. Army officer

Benjamin Henry Grierson
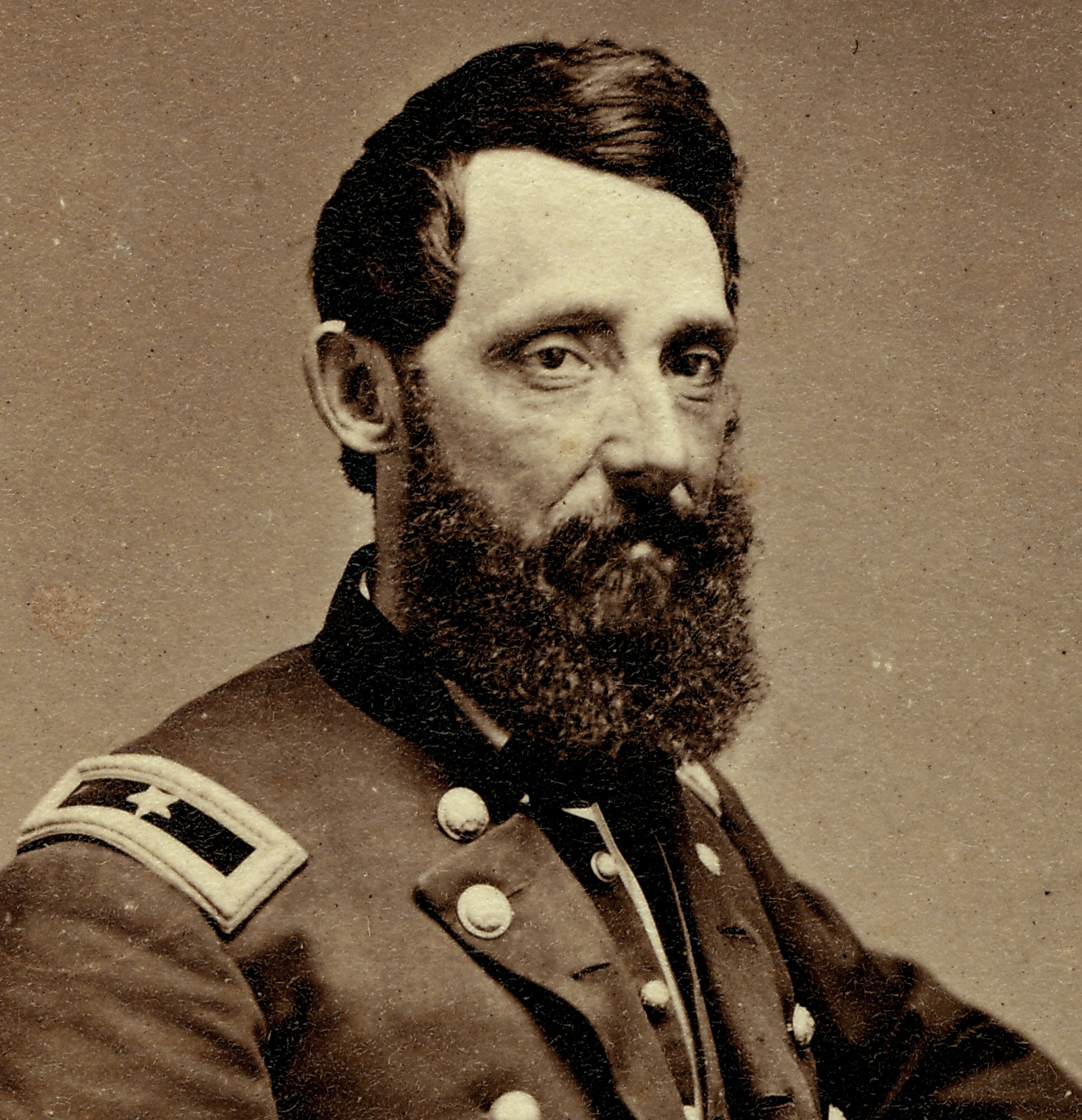
- Portrait of Grierson
- Born: July 8, 1826; Pittsburgh, Pennsylvania
- Died: August 31, 1911 (aged 85); Omena, Michigan
- Burial place: Jacksonville East Cemetery, Morgan County, Illinois
- Military career
- Allegiance: United States of America; Union
- Branch: United States Army; Union Army
- Service years: 1861–1890
- Rank: Brigadier General; Brevet Major General
- Commands: 6th Illinois Cavalry; 10th U.S. Cavalry; Department of Arizona
- Conflicts: American Civil War; American Indian Wars

Benjamin Henry Grierson (July 8, 1826 – August 31, 1911) was a music teacher from Illinois who, although afraid of horses, volunteered for service in the cavalry during the Civil War, commanding a cavalry division Army of the Tennessee and reaching the rank of major general in the United States Volunteers. He is most noted for Grierson's Raid, an 1863 expedition through Confederate-held territory that severed enemy communication lines between Vicksburg, Mississippi and Confederate commanders in the Eastern Theater. After the war, he became colonel of the 10th Cavalry Regiment, an African-American regiment from 1866 until his retirement in 1890.

Grierson was born in Pennsylvania, but moved to the Midwest, where he earned his living as a music teacher and as a partner in an unsuccessful mercantile business. He began his military career as a volunteer aide-de-camp but was soon advanced to major of cavalry. After six months, he was promoted to the command of his regiment and before long to the command of a cavalry brigade, and finally of a cavalry division. As colonel of an African-American regiment, he was disliked by his superiors and fellow officers due to his support for and trust in his black troops. His 26 years of postwar service were spent in garrison and in the field at the southwestern frontier.

== Early life and career ==
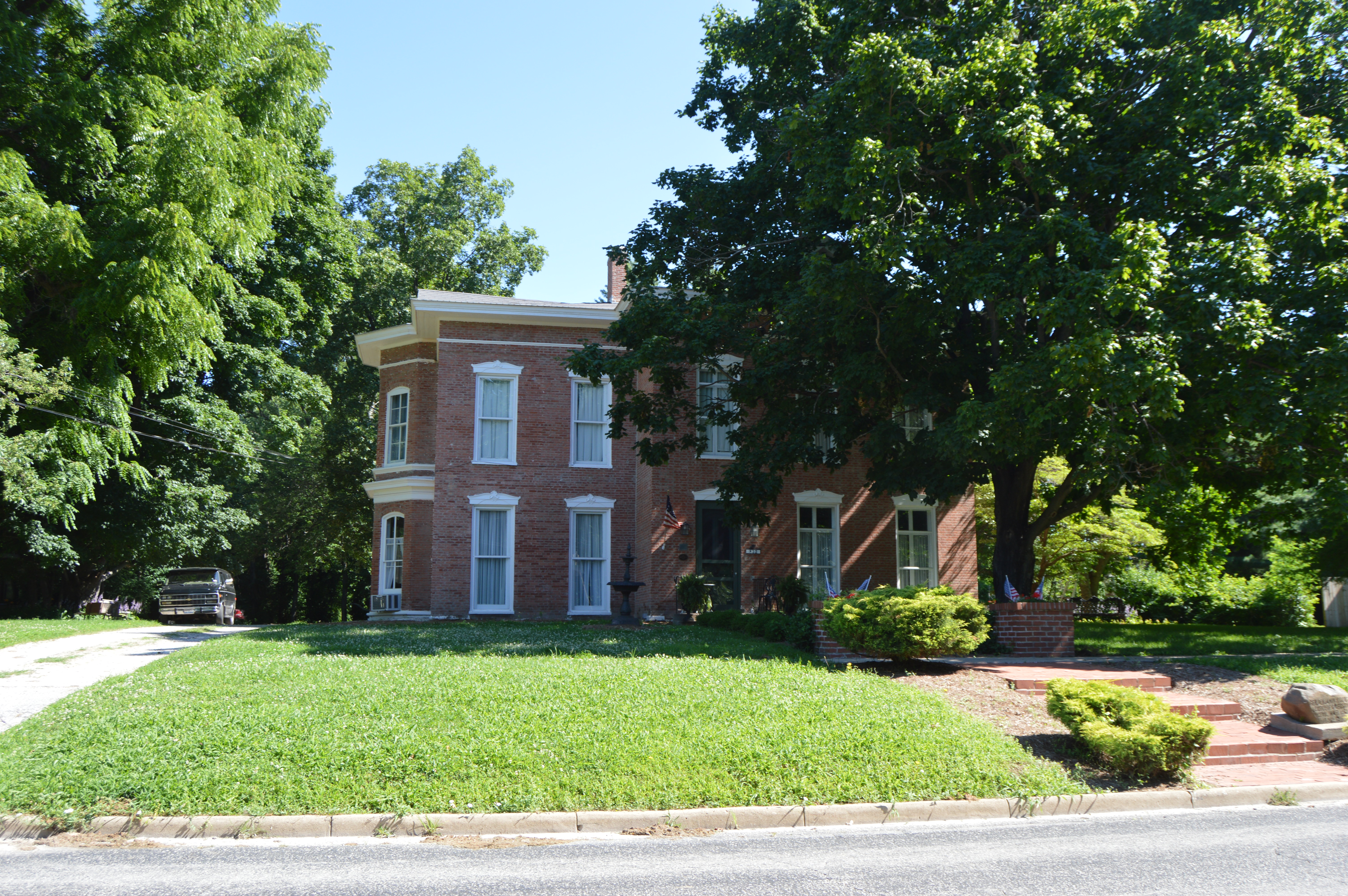
Grierson's house in Jacksonville.

Grierson was born in the borough of Allegheny, Pennsylvania, today a section of Pittsburgh. He was the youngest of five siblings. At age eight, Grierson was kicked and nearly killed by a horse, after which he gained a fear of horses. In 1851, he became a music teacher and band leader in Jacksonville, Illinois. From 1855 to 1861, Grierson was a partner in an unsuccessful mercantile business in Meredosia, Illinois, and was active in Republican politics. He married Alice Kirk of Youngstown, Ohio on September 24, 1854. The couple had seven children, four of whom survived to adulthood.

== Civil War ==
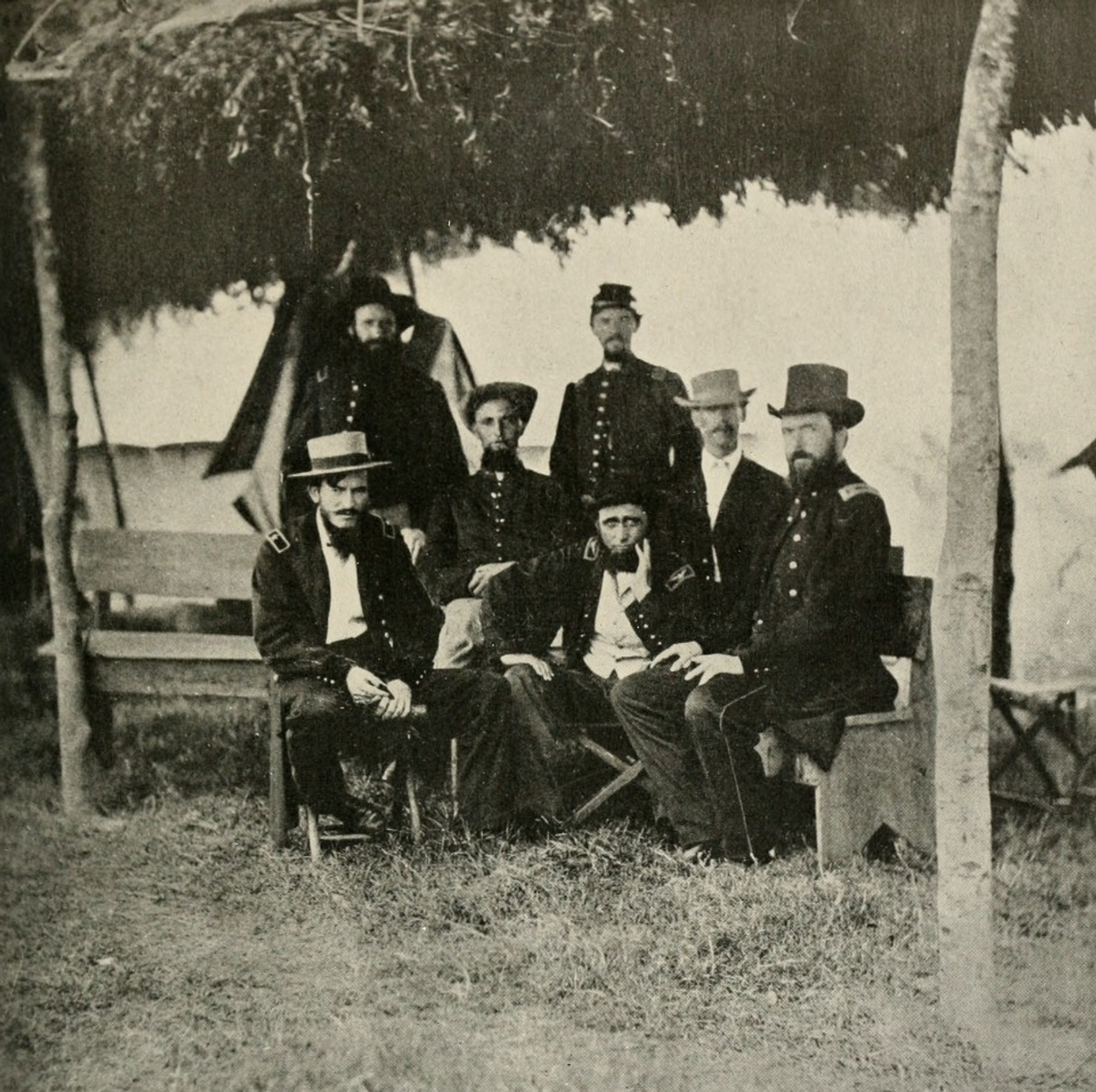
Union Cavalry Colonel Benjamin H. Grierson (seated with hand resting on chin) and staff

With the outbreak of the Civil War, Grierson enlisted as a volunteer aide-de-camp to Maj. Gen. Benjamin M. Prentiss. Promoted to major on October 24, 1861, he joined the 6th Illinois Cavalry and was promoted to colonel of that regiment on April 13, 1862. His regiment was engaged in a number of small skirmishes and raids on railroads and facilities in Tennessee and Mississippi that spring and summer. In November, he became a brigade commander in the Cavalry Division of the Army of the Tennessee. In December, he participated in the pursuit of Confederate Earl Van Dorn after his Holly Springs raid against the supply lines of General Ulysses S. Grant.

In the spring of 1863, he led Grierson's Raid, a major diversionary thrust deep into the Confederacy, ordered by Grant as part of his Vicksburg Campaign. Grierson departed from La Grange, Tennessee, on April 17, in command of 1,700 men of the 6th and 7th Illinois and the 2nd Iowa Cavalry regiments. Over 17 days, his command marched 800 miles, repeatedly engaged the Confederates, disabled two railroads, captured many prisoners and horses, and destroyed vast amounts of property, finally ending in Baton Rouge on May 2. Historian John D. Winters in The Civil War in Louisiana (1963) reports that Grierson's raid "struck fear in the hearts of the citizens and somewhat demoralized the Confederate forces who failed to stop the move."

More importantly, Grierson diverted the attention of the Confederate defenders of Vicksburg away from General Grant's main thrust. Gen. Sherman considered Grierson's raid "the most brilliant expedition of the war." Grierson was promoted to brigadier general of volunteers in June. While ending his raid in Louisiana, he was able to take part in Nathaniel P. Banks' siege of Port Hudson as commander of the XIX Corps cavalry.

In June 1864, Grierson returned to command a cavalry division in the Army of the Tennessee during William T. Sherman's Meridian Campaign. He was still in division command during Samuel D. Sturgis' ill-fated encounter with Nathan B. Forrest at the Battle of Brice's Crossroads. Shortly after that battle, Grierson was transferred to command the Cavalry in the District of West Tennessee. He was attached to Andrew J. Smith's XVI Corps and fared much better against Forrest at the Battle of Tupelo.

Between December 21, 1864, and January 5, 1865, Grierson led an expedition of two brigades of the Cavalry Division against the Mobile and Ohio Railroad. On Christmas Day he surprised and captured Forrest's dismounted camp at Verona, Mississippi, and on December 28 engaged a train carrying an ad hoc Confederate force of approximately 1,200 men at Egypt Station, Mississippi, south of Aberdeen, capturing more than 500 troops, including 253 former Union prisoners who had enlisted as "Galvanized Yankees" in the 10th Tennessee. For this expedition, Grierson received a brevet promotion to the rank of major general.

In the spring of 1865, he took part in Canby's successful campaign to capture Mobile, Alabama.

== Postbellum service in the West ==
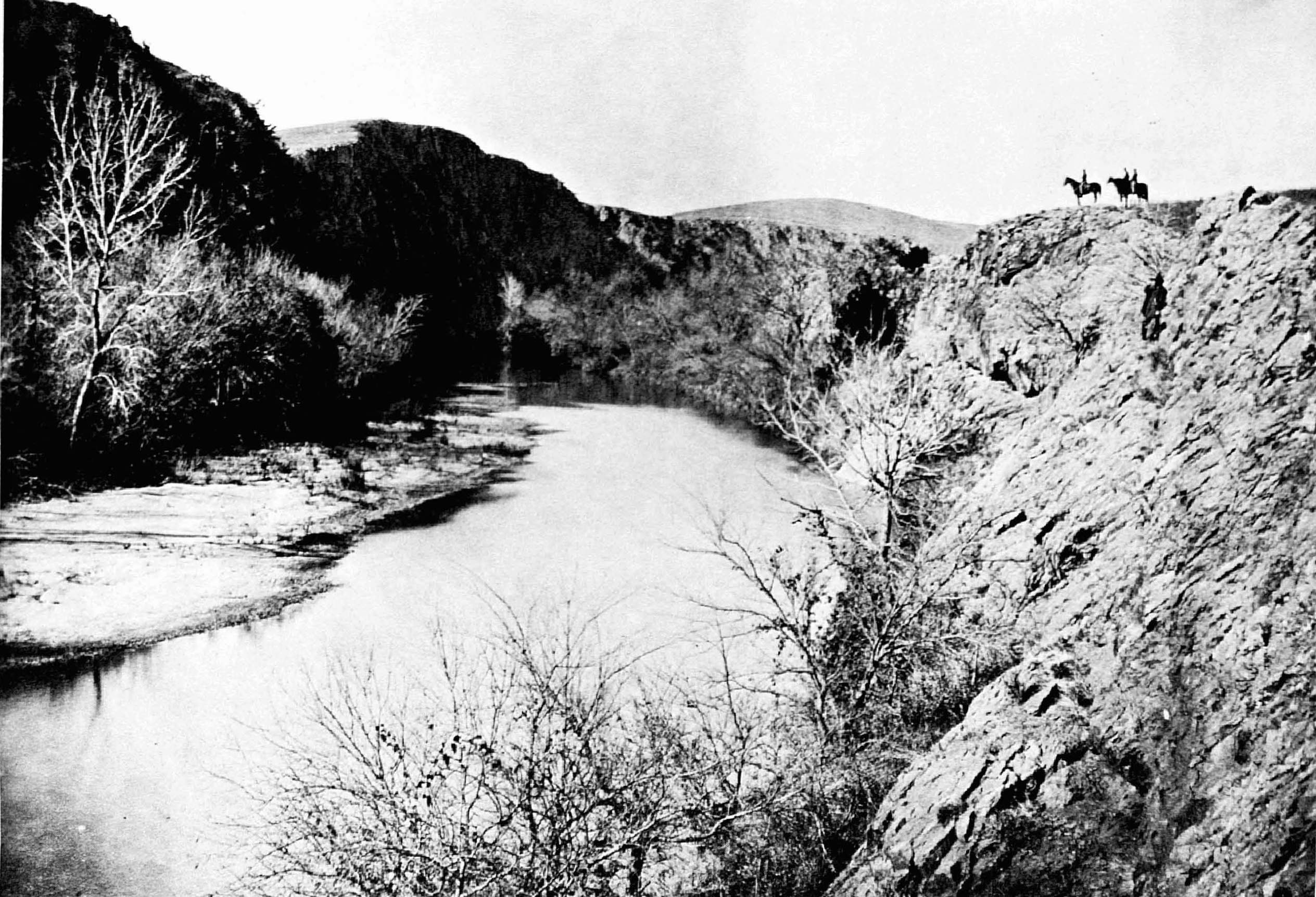
Colonel Grierson at Medicine Bluff Creek when establishing Fort Sill during the winter of 1868-1869.

Grierson decided to pursue a career in the Regular Army after the war, which was unusual for an officer whose only prior military service was as a volunteer officer during the Civil War. His lack of West Point credentials made him suspect to many fellow officers. On 28 July 1866, he was commissioned a colonel in the Regular Army and assigned as the commander of the 10th U.S. Cavalry, one of two mounted regiments composed of black enlisted men and white officers, called the Buffalo Soldiers. This assignment also made him unpopular with other officers, including his superior, General Philip Henry Sheridan, because of his support for and trust in his troops. His sympathy and courtesy to Native American tribes also led to questions about his judgment.

The only White officer who supports the unit is Regimental Commanding Officer Colonel Benjamin Grierson. Ostracized by other officers for his enthusiastic command of the African-American troops, Grierson believes in the abilities, dedication, and record of performance of the Buffalo Soldiers and declines offers to lead at any other post. General Pike offers to relieve Grierson 'of this self-imposed exile and have him commanding a real cavalry regiment within a month,' but Grierson refuses

— Turner Network Television's documentary, "Buffalo Soldiers".

=== Postbellum command history ===
- 1867–69: Commanded Fort Riley, then later Fort Gibson.
- 1868–69: Headed the District of the Indian Territory.
- 1869–72: Selected the site for Camp Wichita, later renamed Fort Sill, Oklahoma, with the 10th Cavalry. Supervised construction and acted as post commander. He angered residents of the Texas frontier with his support of the peace policy on the Kiowa-Comanche Reservation. Saved the life of visiting General William Tecumseh Sherman, during a confrontation with Lone Wolf, principal chief of the Kiowa, over responsibility for an attack on a wagon train near Salt Creek Prairie, Texas.
- 1873–74: Superintendent of the Mounted Recruiting Service at St. Louis.
- 1875–78: Commander at Fort Concho, Texas.
- 1878–80: Commander of the District of the Pecos. In 1880 he helped defeat Victorio to end the Indian threat to West Texas.
- 1882–82: Moved his headquarters to Fort Davis, Texas.
- 1883–83: Commanded the Department of Texas in September and October.
- 1885–86: Transferred to Arizona, commanded Whipple Barracks and later Fort Grant.
- 1886–88: Commanded the District of New Mexico. There he dealt sympathetically and effectively with problems on the Jicarilla and Navajo reservations.
- 1888–90: Commanded the Department of Arizona.
- April 5, 1890: Promoted to Brigadier General.
- July 8, 1890: Retired, having reached the mandatory retirement age of 64.

His wife, Alice, died on August 14, 1888. Grierson married Lillian Atwood King, a widow, on July 28, 1897. During his life, he had homes in Jacksonville, Illinois, Fort Concho, and a summer home at Omena, Michigan. In 1907, he suffered a debilitating stroke; he died on August 31, 1911, in Omena, Leelanau County, Michigan. He is buried in Jacksonville East Cemetery in Jacksonville, a town in Morgan County, Illinois.

== Grierson in media ==
Colonel Grierson is a prominent figure in Turner Network Television's documentary, "Buffalo Soldiers".

The part of Colonel Marlowe, played by John Wayne in the movie The Horse Soldiers, is loosely based on Grierson, from a book by Harold Sinclair.

== See also ==
- List of American Civil War generals (Union)
- Clan Grierson
- Grierson Spring
