= Mary Moore (artist) =

Australian artist

- Born: June 25, 1957 (age 67)

Mary Moore (born 25 June 1957) is a Western Australian artist. Her paintings are inspired by the day-to-day existence of her family, creating works that speak of optimism and confidence about life. She makes spaces that she charges with her meanings so that people who look at them can become evolved and make up their own stories.

Her work 'Big brain' was produced while she was a student in printmaking at WAIT (now Curtin University). Her approach derives from pop art, making use of puns, such as her Gay Paris and the Eyefull Tower from her stamp series, and incorporating throw away items to comment on contemporary culture.

In 1999, she was part of the group exhibition Rebirth, Western Australian Women Celebrating a Century of Change at the Moores Building and curated by Lyn DiCiero.

In 2001, she was awarded the Portia Geach Memorial Award for compelling self-portraiture.

== Solo exhibitions ==
Moore has exhibited at museums and galleries in Australia:

- 1991 Self Portrait, Lawrence Wilson Art Gallery, University of Western Australia
- 1989 Artist in Focus 7 - Mary Moore, Art Gallery of Western Australia
- 1983 Gallery 52, Claremont, WA
- 1982 Prints from London - Drawings from everywhere, Gallery A, Sydney
- 1981 Gallery 52, Claremont, WA
- 1979 Drawings x Paintings, Fremantle Arts Centre, WA
- 1977 Red Dingo Show, Undercroft Gallery, UWA

== Collections ==
Moore's work is included in public collections, including

- Art Gallery of Western Australia
- Lawrence Wilson Art Gallery at the University of Western Australia
- Royal College of Art, London
- Janet Holmes à Court Collection
- National Portrait Gallery of Australia
