= 6th Illinois Cavalry Regiment =

- Illinois flag
- Active: November 19, 1861, to November 20, 1865
- Country: United States
- Allegiance: Union
- Branch: Cavalry
- Engagements: Siege of Port Hudson; Battle of Nashville

The 6th Illinois Cavalry Regiment was a cavalry regiment that served in the Union Army during the American Civil War.

== Service ==
The 6th Illinois Volunteer Cavalry was mustered into service at Camp Butler, Illinois, on November 19, 1861. The regiment mustered out on November 20, 1865.

== Total strength and casualties ==
The regiment suffered 5 officers and 60 enlisted men who were killed in action or who died of their wounds and 8 officers and 328 enlisted men who died of disease, for a total of 401 fatalities.

== Personnel ==
- Major Arno Voss – reassigned to 12th Illinois Cavalry February 1, 1862
- Colonel Thomas H. Cavanaugh – resigned March 28, 1862.
- Colonel Benjamin H. Grierson – promoted to brigadier general June 3, 1863.
- Colonel Matthew H. Starr – died of wounds October 1, 1864.
- Colonel John Lynch – mustered out with the regiment.

== See also ==
- List of Illinois Civil War Units
- Illinois in the American Civil War
- Lizzie Aiken, Civil War Nurse
