= Mary Moore (American Civil War nurse) =

American Civil War nurse

- Occupation: Nurse

Mary Moore was a Union nurse during the American Civil War.

== Civil War service ==
In November 1861, Moore was appointed to hospital matron by Colonel Smith of the 58th regiment of the Illinois Volunteers. She served with the regiment at Camp Douglas, Chicago, until February 1862. She later moved with the regiment to Fort Donelson, Tennessee to work on a hospital steamer. While working at Fort Donelson, Moore would often work for days on no sleep and little food, usually coffee and hardtack.

Moore left the service when her husband died, nine months after she began working in hospitals.
