= Mary A. Gardner Holland =

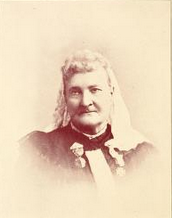
Mary A. Gardner Holland

Mary A. Gardner Holland's signature

Mary A. Gardner Holland (fl. 1865-1897) was an American nurse during the American Civil War.

In 1897, more than 30 years after the war, Holland compiled accounts from numerous American Civil War nurses into her book Our Army Nurses: Stories from Women in the Civil War. The book begins with an introduction by Holland herself; she writes "what more fitting place for women with holy motives and tenderest sympathy than on those fields of blood and death or in retreats prepared for our suffering heroes?"

According to Holland's account, she worked in hospitals for around 14 months. She would have enlisted earlier, she writes, if she didn't have an aging mother depending upon her. Ultimately, Holland cared for her mother during the day then worked with the Sanitary Commission on weekday evenings until Holland wrote to Dorothea Dix asking to be recruited. Holland was stationed at Columbia College Hospital in Meridian Heights, a suburb of Washington, D.C. From there she went to West Washington and then to Annapolis, serving as a matron.
